= The Red Krayola (album) =

Studio album by Red Krayola
- Released: September 20, 1994
- Genre: Alternative rock
- Length: 37:21
- Label: Drag City

Red Krayola chronology
Malefactor, Ade (1989)	The Red Krayola (1994)	Coconut Hotel (1995)

The Red Krayola is an album by the American band Red Krayola, released in 1994 by Drag City.

Frontman Mayo Thompson had been living in Germany prior to the recording of the album. He was lured back into the studio by younger musicians who considered him an influence.

== Critical reception ==
Professional ratings
Review scores
Source	Rating
AllMusic	3/5 stars
Spin Alternative Record Guide	7/10

The Chicago Reader praised the album, writing: "It's the band's most blatant 'rock' outing, but among the barbed guitar riffs, weird synth gurgles, and solid rhythmic underpinnings is Thompson's usual caustic humor, this time ripping apart the sacred cows of rock and pop."

== Track listing ==
No.	Title	Length
1.	"Jimmy Silk/Supper Be Ready Medley"	1:57
2.	"Pride"	1:06
3.	"Book of Kings"	2:40
4.	"Pessimisty"	2:50
5.	"Worms, Worms, Thirst"	1:38
6.	"People Get Ready (The Train's Not Coming)"	3:22
7.	"If 'S' Is"	2:06
8.	"Miss X"	2:37
9.	"Rapspierre"	2:44
10.	"Stand-Up"	2:42
11.	"Art-Dog"	1:09
12.	"I Knew It"	1:54
13.	"101st"	1:54
14.	"(Why) I'm So Blasé"	2:07
15.	"The Big Macumba"	2:42
16.	"Voodoo Child"	1:47
17.	"Suddenly"	1:51

== Personnel ==
Red Krayola

- David Grubbs
- John McEntire
- Albert Oehlen
- Jim O'Rourke
- Stephen Prina
- Mayo Thompson
- Tom Watson

Additional musicians and production

- Steve Albini – engineering
- Brian Paulson – engineering
- Bob Weston – engineering
