= God Bless the Red Krayola and All Who Sail With It =

Album by Red Krayola

God Bless the Red Krayola and All Who Sail with It

Studio album by Red Krayola
- Released: May 1968
- Recorded: February 7 – March 8, 1968
- Studios: Gold Star (Houston, Texas)
- Genres: Experimental rock; proto-punk; avant-garde
- Length: 37:20
- Label: International Artists
- Producer: Red Krayola (Mayo Thompson)

Red Krayola chronology
The Parable of Arable Land (1967)	God Bless the Red Krayola and All Who Sail with It (1968)	Corrected Slogans (1976)

God Bless the Red Krayola and All Who Sail with It is the second commercially released studio album by the American rock band Red Krayola. It was released in May 1968 by the independent record label known as International Artists.

The album was recorded at Gold Star and marked the departure of founding member Frederick Barthelme who was replaced by drummer Tommy Smith (formerly of Bubble Puppy). The band received a cease & desist letter from Crayola, prompting them to change their name to "Red Krayola". The album would be the group's final release until the late 1970s when they returned under a new lineup.

In 2022, the album was placed at number 185 on Uncut's "The 500 Greatest Albums of the 1960s" list.

== Background ==
In 1968, the Red Crayola received a cease & desist letter from the Binney & Smith company, the manufacturers of Crayola crayons; in compliance, they changed their name from "Red Crayola" to "Red Krayola". In June 1967, the band recorded a follow-up album to their debut, entitled Coconut Hotel, but it was rejected by the label and not released until 1995. UCLA professor Kurt Von Meier, who had heard demo tapes of Coconut Hotel, invited the band to perform at the Berkeley Folk Festival. During the event, they performed with folk guitarist John Fahey and later recorded an album with him. The label, International Artists, demanded that the tapes be given to them due to infringement on their contract, leading to them being lost.

After the event, bandleader Mayo Thompson felt at "loose ends" with the label, and took a break from the band, deciding to briefly live in Venice, Los Angeles along with Joseph Byrd of the United States of America. There, he shared rehearsal space with the group and worked the PA system when they played a concert at Los Angeles City College. Byrd had been influenced by the Red Crayola and a fan of their work, he attended early rehearsals with the group when they were a trio. Additionally, Thompson attended the United States of America's first show at a club known as "the Magic Mushroom" in San Fernando Valley. Thompson also ran into Nico, who had just left the Velvet Underground looking for musicians for her next solo album. Thompson did not work with her, stating that "she was not interested in what I was doing".

In August 1967, Frederick Barthelme left the band to pursue writing and conceptual art in New York City (working for a brief period at the Kornblee Gallery). He decided to only perform music at home. Thompson stated the band was effectively "dead", until following the humble success of The Parable of Arable Land, he was contacted by International Artists about another album. A new lineup was formed with drummer Tommy Smith (not to be confused with Tommy Smith & The Laughing Kynd) who had previously played with psychedelic band Bubble Puppy. At the time, producer Lelan Rogers had left International Artists, leading to the album being recorded at Gold Star and audio engineered by Jim Duff.

== Recording and production ==
The album was recorded in one month, mostly on four-track, with no use of effects until the artificial reverb at the end of "Night Song". Thompson stated, "A lot of it was written on the fly, on the feet" and that the band "eschewed all technical embellishment" for recording and production. The album's cover art was drawn by Thompson while the title was a reference to a phrase associated with British Ceremonial ship launching.

"Say Hello to Jamie Jones" and "Green of My Pants" were the first two songs they recorded, and they were both done in a single take. On the 17th, Mayo and Steve came back for an overdubbing session, and on the 18th, they cut "Leejol", "Victory Garden", "Music" and "Free Piece". Between the 20th and the 23rd, the album's remaining tracks were recorded, and by the end of the month, they had been edited and mixed. The album was finished on 9 March and submitted to Columbia Studios in Hollywood on the 25th for mastering on vinyl after Mayo returned to the studio to record more material during the first week of March.

"The Shirt" consisted of a sound collage merging three separate written songs by the band "There There Betty Betty", "Mother" and "In My Baby's Ruth" (songs later re-recorded on the album Fingerpainting):

I guess that we had the funniest use of the Gold Star reverb chambers. One night we just decided to do something funny in the chambers. So we went to a 7-Eleven store and got a whole bunch of those little paper bags... So we had a whole stack of these things, and we opened up the chamber and crawled in there. We put a guitar in one corner, then we started blowing up the bags with air, and then we popped them, wadded them up, and threw them at the guitar. We recorded the whole process and used it in a song called “The Shirt.” We added some tracks to that, but it was basically the song.

On producing the record, Mayo Thompson remarked, "I'm credited on God Bless The Red Krayola and All Who Sail With It [1968]. I played a role and so did Steve but we weren't the producers. It was Jim Duff".

"Dairymaid's Lament" and "Free Piece" were previously recorded as an intended debut single by Bob Steffek at Andrus Studio in February 1967. "Ravi Shankar: Parachutist" (originally Parachutist) and "Green of My Pants" (originally Nickle Niceness) were partially written in late 1966, with the latter being recorded in a March 1967 demo session for International Artists later released on Epitaph for a Legend (1980). Sherlock Holmes and Victory Garden were originally known as "Fat Fat" and "Chromium Fuhrer".

== Release and critical reception ==
=== Contemporary reviews ===
God Bless the Red Krayola and All Who Sail With It was released in May 1968 and failed to live up to the commercial success of The Parable of Arable Land: it sold only around 6,000 copies and was dismissed by most critics. The Chicago Seed reviewed it on July 7, 1968. They compared the record to their debut and disliked the change in direction:

Unfortunately, the Crayola has fallen prey to the same exhaustion that seems to have hit so many other interesting groups. The handball noises in "The Shirt" are poor compensation for the absence of the Familiar Ugly.

On December 7, 1968, Larry Sepulvado and John Burks partially reviewed the album in an article of Rolling Stone magazine: "[The Red Krayola's] second album focuses on the acute cleverness of Mayo and Steve. Though the album is self-indulgent at times, the 22 songs express a wit judged on its own terms to be as direct as a B.C. comic strip".

At the time, International Artists promoted God Bless through radio spots and promotional posters, the label also intended for the band to tour the album across the States and record a music video. Thompson stated, "When it came out we got a call from a DJ at the radio station that had run the [KNUZ] battle of the bands I mentioned. He wanted us to do things for him to use, funny slugs to break up his show. We declined—stupidly. It didn't do business, though the label liked it. It is a funny enough record."

Red Krayola fell out with International Artists, and as demands grew for Tommy Smith elsewhere, they could not tour the album live as intended. As a result, the group disbanded. Steve Cunningham moved to Vienna in 1969 to study linguistics whilst Thompson moved on to other endeavors such as recording his solo album for the Walt Andrus label Texas Revolution, and working with the conceptual art group Art & Language. The band would not reform until the late 1970s, when Thompson moved to England.

=== Retrospective assessment ===
Professional ratings
Review scores
Source	Rating
AllMusic	4.5/5 stars
The Encyclopedia of Popular Music	4/5 stars
Pitchfork	9.5/10
Spin Alternative Record Guide	9/10

Dave Marsh wrote in The New Rolling Stone Record Guide, "As a psychedelic novelty (from Texas yet), the Crayola was a late-Sixties amusement – the only band in the world ever to record a motorcycle live in the studio. That was on the inaugural disc, Parable. With God Bless, the joke had already worn thin, but after Radar reissued the first two albums in England, a band of arty post-punk minimalists attempted to carry the tradition onward, with particularly insipid results".

The Spin Alternative Record Guide called the album "superb", describing it as "small songs full of quiet terror and acoustic confusion".

AllMusic wrote, "God Bless the Red Krayola and All Who Sail With It bears precious little resemblance to anything else that appeared at the time; it would take a few decades of post-punk experimentalism before Mayo Thompson's vision would have a truly suitable context". Additionally, Deming would assess the opening track as "sounding like a post-punk experiment from late-'70s London".

In 2004, Pitchfork reviewed the album, writing, "For all the laudations heaped upon the Krayola by the punk and post-punk crowds, it might as well be bootleg Einstürzende Neubauten at its grimiest atonality and infuritating double integral time signatures". Lindhart added "the Krayola's legacy is surely bolstered by their location in rock history – simply put, this was likely the most experimental band of the 1960s". In 2006, Magnet described the album as an "intriguingly sparse, 20-song effort", adding "Its abstract themes, pointed guitar playing and edgy rhythmic shifts prefigure early-period Fall and the no-wave movement by a decade."

In 2015, writer Ben Graham in the book A Gathering of Promises, stated the album found "semi-kindred spirits in post-punk outfits" and compared it to Swell Maps, Young Marble Giants, the Raincoats, Pavement and Guided by Voices. Additionally, he described "Dairymaid's Lament" as "stop-start punk rock" and compared "The Jewels of the Madonna" to Sonic Youth. That same year, Keith Connolly of Bomb stated the album contained "discernable seeds" of Thompson's Corky's Debt to His Father and sounded as if it were "predicting" the Minutemen, Unrest, Bastro and Gastr Del Sol. In 2020, Texas Monthly wrote, "With no song topping 3 minutes. A generation on, [the] album would be a blueprint for punk rock".

In 2022, God Bless the Red Krayola and All Who Sail With It was placed at number 185 on Uncut's "The 500 Greatest Albums of the 1960s" list.

== Track listing ==
All tracks are written by Red Krayola.

Side A
No.	Title	Length
1.	"Say Hello to Jamie Jones"	2:30
2.	"Music"	1:00
3.	"The Shirt"	2:30
4.	"Listen to This"	0:04
5.	"Save the House"	1:24
6.	"Victory Garden"	1:48
7.	"Coconut Hotel"	1:22
8.	"Sheriff Jack"	2:12
9.	"Free Piece"	2:18
10.	"Ravi Shankar: Parachutist"	2:09
11.	"Piece for Piano and Electric Bass Guitar"	0:45
12.	"Dairymaid's Lament"	2:30

Side B
No.	Title	Length
1.	"Big"	1:37
2.	"Leejol"	2:40
3.	"Sherlock Holmes"	2:55
4.	"Dirth of Tilth"	1:26
5.	"Tina's Gone to Have a Baby"	1:49
6.	"The Jewels of the Madonna"	1:29
7.	"Green of My Pants"	3:00
8.	"Night Song"	1:52
Total length:		37:20

== Legacy ==
Joseph Byrd of the United States of America called "Listen to This" his favorite song on the album. Other notable fans of the album include Manos Hatzidakis and Andrew VanWyngarden of MGMT. The Soup Dragons covered the song "Listen to This" on a John Peel session in 1987. Galaxie 500 covered "Victory Garden" on a 1990 single.

As part of the 2011 CD reissue booklet Sonic Boom of Spacemen 3 (who remastered the album as well as their debut at New Atlantis studios) said: "Nearly every track, recorded in '68, seems to presage the whole of independent music from '75 thru to, well, now!" also comparing portions of the tracklist to artists such as Syd Barrett, MGMT, Richard Hell, Robert Quine, Joy Division, Tortoise, the Only Ones, the Modern Lovers, Animal Collective and the Monochrome Set. Additionally, Kember noted that Thompson, "somehow forecast his work with Pere Ubu".

== Personnel ==
Red Krayola

- Steve Cunningham – fretless bass guitar, cover design
- Tommy Smith – drums, cover design
- Mayo Thompson – guitar, piano, vocals, cover design (credited as producer on the vinyl disc as well as the rest of the band on the liner notes but the LP was actually produced by Jim Duff)

Technical personnel

- Jim Duff – Engineer, producer
- Fred Caroll – Engineer
- Dennis Collins – Engineer

Additional personnel

- Chorus Singers – Mary Sue, Dotty, Pat Pritchett, Barbara Metyko, Elaine Banks, Carolyn Heinman and Candy
- Holly Pritchett – vocals on "Big"
- Dick Wray – back cover photographer (of Mayo and Steve)
- Guy Clark – back cover photographer (of Tommy Smith)

== Release history ==
Region	Date	Title	Label	Format	Catalog
USA	1968	God Bless the Red Krayola and All Who Sail with It	International Artists	Stereo LP	IA-LP-7
USA	1968	God Bless the Red Krayola and All Who Sail with It	International Artists	8-Track Cartridge Stereo	IA-LP-7
UK	1979	God Bless the Red Krayola and All Who Sail with It	Radar Records	Stereo LP	RAD 16
UK	1988	God Bless the Red Krayola and All Who Sail with It	Decal	Stereo LP	LIK 29
USA	1993	God Bless the Red Krayola and All Who Sail with It	Collectables	CD	COL-CD-0555
France	1995	God Bless the Red Krayola and All Who Sail with It	Spalax Music	CD	14898
Italy	1999	God Bless the Red Krayola and All Who Sail with It	Get Back	Stereo LP	GET534
Italy	2002	God Bless the Red Krayola and All Who Sail with It	Sunspots	CD	SPOT 521
Italy	2006	God Bless the Red Krayola and All Who Sail with It	Get Back	Stereo LP	GET90534
UK	2011	God Bless the Red Krayola and All Who Sail with It	Charly Records	CD	SNAX631CD

^aThis release includes extensive liner notes, including interviews and photographs

== Bibliography ==
- Graham, Ben (2015). A Gathering of Promises: The Battle for Texas's Psychedelic Music, from the 13th Floor Elevators to the Black Angels and Beyond. Zero Books. ISBN 978-1782790945.
