= The Parable of Arable Land =

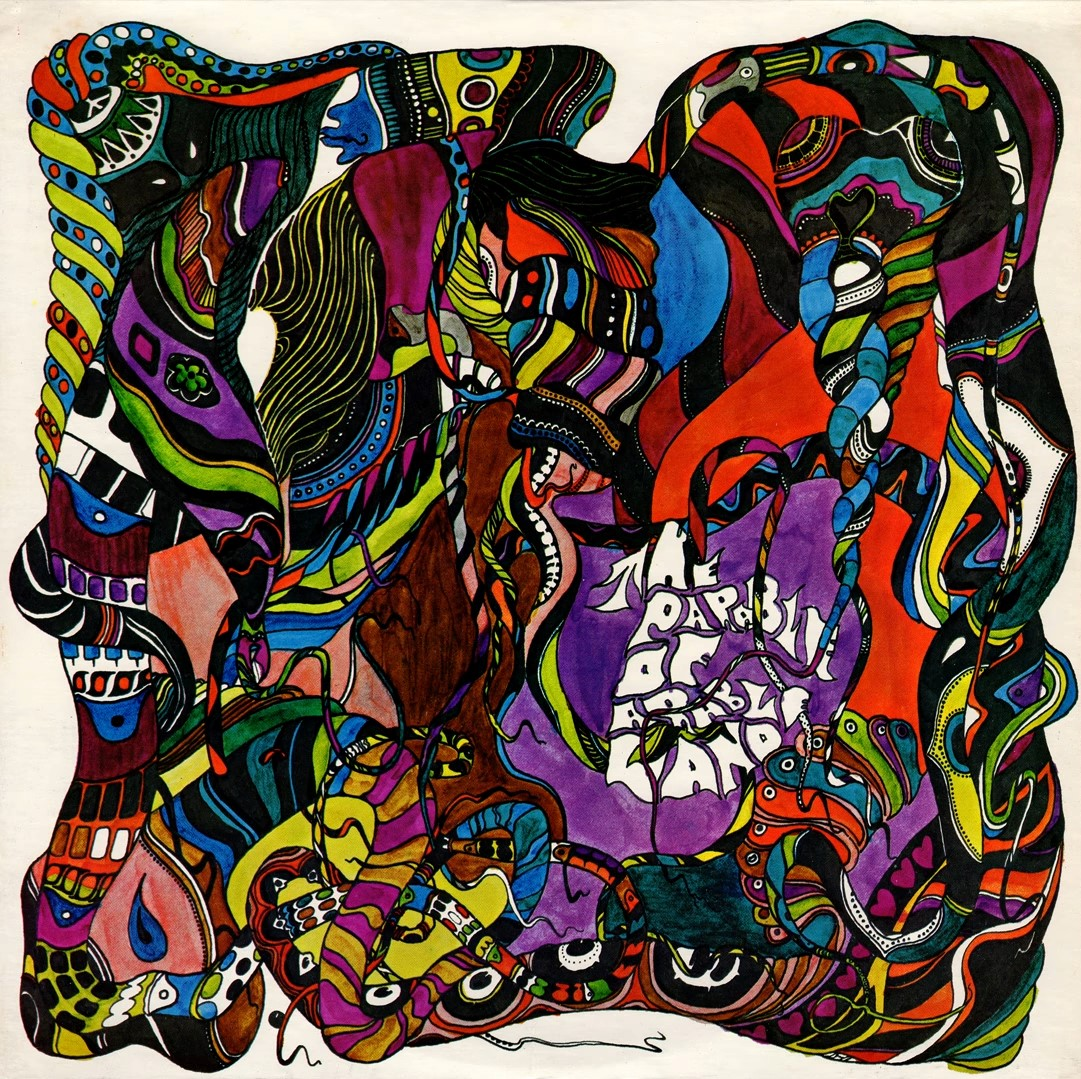

Studio album by Red Crayola with the Familiar Ugly
- Released: June 1967
- Recorded: April 1 – May 11, 1967
- Studios: Andrus, Houston
- Genres: Experimental rock; psychedelic rock; noise rock
- Length: 41:17
- Label: International Artists
- Producer: Lelan Rogers

The Red Krayola chronology
The Parable of Arable Land (1967)	God Bless the Red Krayola and All Who Sail With It (1968)

The Parable of Arable Land is the debut studio album by the American rock band Red Crayola released in June 1967 by International Artists. The album features notable instrumental cameos by label mate and 13th Floor Elevators frontman Roky Erickson, as well as collaborative pieces with their secondary group "The Familiar Ugly". It was produced by Lelan Rogers and audio engineered by Walt Andrus and Frank Davis.

The album was ranked number 18 on the NME's list "Top 100 Cult Albums to Hear Before You Die", number 57 on Spin's "Top 100 Alternative Albums of the 1960s", and number 169 on Uncut's "the 500 Greatest Albums of the 1960s".

In 2011, The Parable of Arable Land was reissued on Charly Records and remastered by Sonic Boom of Spacemen 3 who had previously covered Transparent Radiation.

== Background ==
In March 1967, the Red Crayola which consisted of guitarist and vocalist Mayo Thompson, drummer Frederick Barthelme and bassist Steve Cunningham, performed with the Familiar Ugly at the Gulfgate Mall for local radio station KNUZ's "Battle of the Bands", where they were discovered by International Artists producer, Lelan Rogers, the brother of Kenny Rogers. Thompson remarked:

He [Rogers] said that was funny. He said that he thought he couldn't believe that we were serious. He thought it must be comedy [...] We got unplugged in the course of the set, kept playing anyway, and then somebody plugged it back in and we went on playing.

Rogers later remarked on discovering the band, "There was this group of kids, three of them, up on a stage that had four or five different kinds of instruments and they could not play a note. They were just making noise and they were really putting the people on. I figured anybody that was able to put on a crowd like that -- there's got to be a market. I went over and I said, 'Hey guys, give me a call". Thompson stated, "Lelan'd obviously thought about what we were up to, how to get it down, and exploit it". That same month, the band were signed by Rogers and invited for a demo session at Walt Andrus studio. Thompson stated "they wanted to know what the songs were, and I didn't want to tell them everything. So I played some tunes for them. Went in and made a demo".

Additionally, Thompson stated that Rogers was the one to refer to their improvisations as "freak-outs," the band themselves originally referred to them as "free pieces". Adding, "The guy [Rogers] was looking for an advertising slogan. That was his form; that was his description of what we did. I just clung onto it because I'm a nominalist; So I'm just going with what we're calling it historically".

== Recording ==
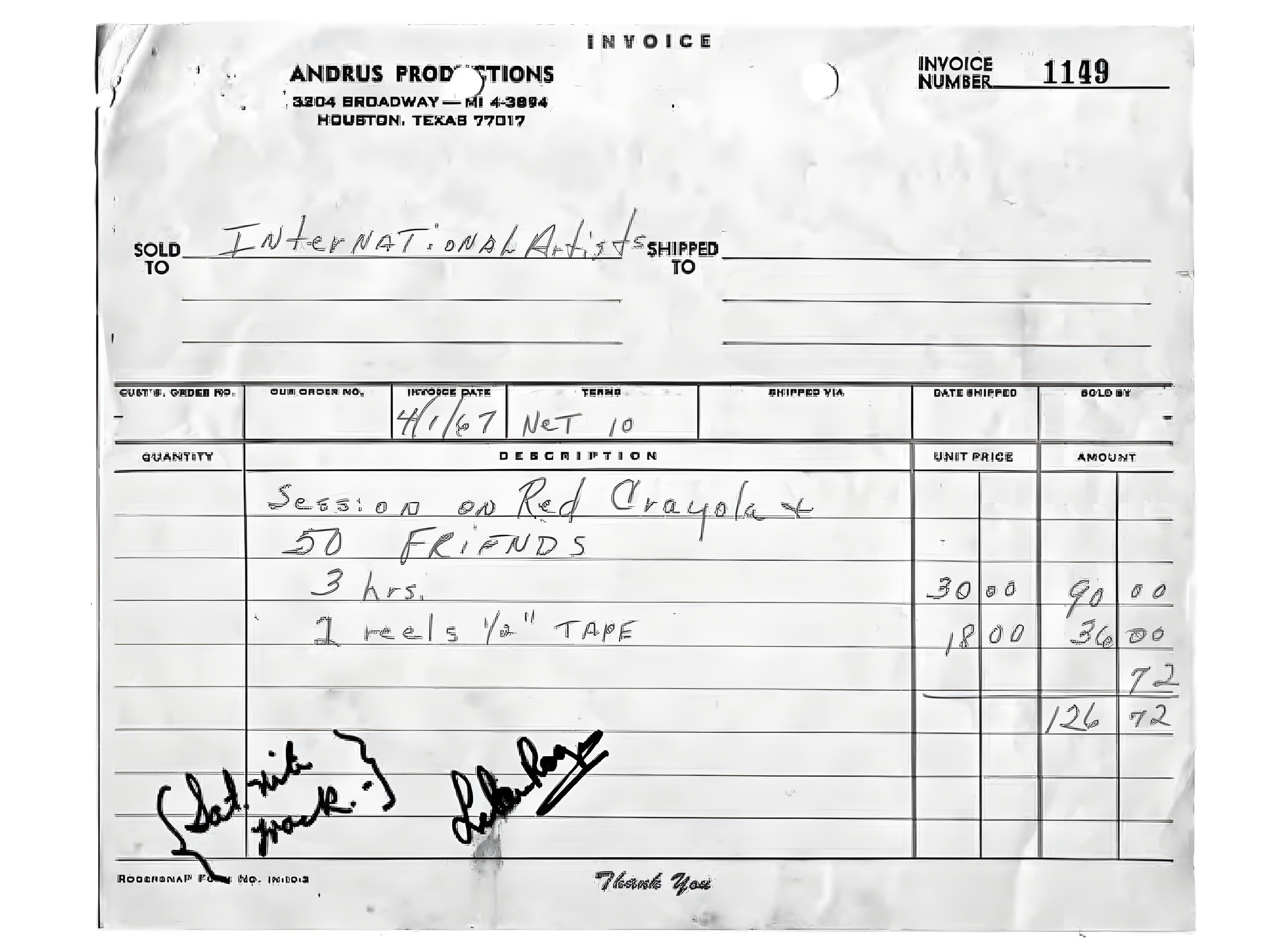
Recording studio invoice from April 1, 1967

=== Tracks ===
The Familiar Ugly were recorded on April Fool's Day 1967 in one hour evening session, done on eight tracks with eight microphones, one per channel. The album's other tracks were recorded on 3 different sessions from April–May, the first session began on April 10 for "Hurricane Fighter Plane" (originally Golden Chalice) and "Pink Stainless Tail", with Roky Erickson of the 13th Floor Elevators being invited in to play the organ part for the former, he was later invited to play harmonica on "Transparent Radiation". Allegedly, due to his heavy use of psychedelics, Erickson was already "out there", prompting Tommy Hall to step in as a translator, guiding Thompson to show Erickson the chord changes. The lyrics to "Hurricane Fighter Plane" and "War Sucks" were improvised on the day of recording and were the only songs lyrically written by Thompson, he later described the recording process of "War Sucks":

After Lelan suggested dropping the original chord progression—a kind of standard repeating ascending rocky sort of thing, he said to play what he called 'that jungle thing.' 'That jungle thing' was a jam in E that owed something to raga. It was a descendent of what we called 'free pieces'—where we'd play whatever in no key in particular.

Additionally, Thompson stated that Lelan Rogers contributed a lot to the album's production, even though the main engineers were Frank Davis and Walt Andrus: "We profited from his suggestions. He egged us on during the Familiar Ugly sessions; during the recording of the songs, he suggested this or that [...] Lelan’s liner notes reflect his speech and attitudes in general, the kind of talk, the level of hype, hip, spin and buzz that informed everything he was and did, at least around us…". Rogers also claimed the Familiar Ugly brought their "trips" to the recording session.

Thompson stated that before the recording session, a motorcyclist drove by the studio to question the band and was later persuaded to be a part of the album:

A guy was riding down the street on his motorbike and there were 50, 60 people standing outside the recording studio, and he's going, 'What're you all doing?' 'Well we're going to go in here and make a record in a minute.' 'Really, no kidding. That's interesting. Y'all are in a band, that's a lot of people.' 'No, these are our friends and... you wanna come in and bring your motorbike in?' 'Oh really? That's cool.' So this guy brought his chopper in. We said, 'Okay here's how it's gonna start. Ricky's gonna start the chopper, and when he starts it, everybody hits it. When you hear that thing kick in, everybody jump on it.' And there it went. Then you just filled up the tape and then somebody walked out and said, 'Okay, tape stopped,' and it's over. Everybody went out and had a cigarette and then came back in and tried it again 30 minutes later.

The April 10th sessions contained lost unreleased recordings titled "F.R.E.D" and "Water Vessel". The bonus track "Vile Vile Grass" (an early demo of "War Sucks") was recorded in a March 1967 demo session, and later released on the compilation album Epitaph For a Legend (1980), the song "Nickle Niceness" was re-written in 1968 as "Green of My Pants".

=== Stereo and mono mix ===
According to Lelan Rogers, producer Walt Andrus had mistakenly folded the Familiar Ugly session to mono, leading to Andrus creating an artificial stereo mix for the "Free Form Freak-Out" tracks, he stated, "Well, unfortunately I made the master in mono, and the stereo version I did by doing what we called “miracle sound” where you make a copy of it and flange and get it a little out of phase, swoosh it around some". However, the album's songs were multitracked and recorded in stereo, though Andrus decided to apply various psychedelic effects (such as loops, reverb, reversed tapes and speed fluctuations). Mayo Thompson later stated:

We went back and pieced it together so that it would have a flow to it and all the while we were naïve [...] if we'd had our druthers, we would have multitracked the free form stuff, because we could have done more of our own thing. As it was, it was just frozen. [The simulated stereo mix] is Walt Andrus' studio wizardry. We made the mono version and then like two days later I was around the studio, and they said, 'Come here, what about this for a stereo album?' And I sat there and listened to it and I said, 'sounds okay to me, crazy, but sounds okay.' And then over the next couple of days we went in and did the backing tracks [for the songs] — we played them live, with few overdubs.

Barthelme was unhappy with the stereo mix, he remarked: "The first LP, The Parable of Arable Land is a wonder if you are wasted, and a poor example otherwise, as the nice guy who recorded it did it on two tracks instead of thirty-two, thus flattening the thing out somewhat." Thompson described the record's mono and stereo mix as essentially "two different albums", the stereo mix was made completely without any input from the band members.

== Music and production ==
The Red Crayola were originally part of the Texas psychedelic rock scene and drew influences from experimental rock artists such as Frank Zappa and the Fugs, along with avant-garde music composers John Cage and Harry Partch. Other influences included free jazz albums such as Albert Ayler's Bells and John Coltrane's Ascension. Lelan Rogers proposed having the record intermingle songs with the Familiar Ugly, which the band agreed was also their original idea. The album's title was coined by Steve Cunningham, while the cover art was drawn by George Banks (under the pseudonym "Flash Graphics"), the informal manager of the 13th Floor Elevators. It was the first of many other IA releases he would illustrate such as the Elevator's Easter Everywhere (1967), the Golden Dawn's Power Plant (1968) and the Lost & Found's Forever Lasting Plastic Words (1968).

Although all of the songs are credited as being written by the whole band, an interview in Mother: Houston's Rock Magazine (1968) stated, "Hurricane Fighter Plane" was written by Thompson, the lyrics to "Transparent Radiation" were written by Barthelme whilst the music was written by Thompson; Barthelme and Thompson wrote the lyrics to "War Sucks" whilst the music was written by the whole band; Barthelme also wrote the lyrics to "Pink Stainless Tail" whilst the music was written by Thompson; "Parable of Arable Land" was written by the whole band while "Former Reflections Enduring Doubt" was entirely written by Cunningham.

Tracks recorded before their debut album in a March 1967 demo session were released on the International Artists archive compilation Epitaph For A Legend (1980), and subsequently re-released on the 2011 reissue of The Parable of Arable Land. In a review, Unterberger wrote, "The five Red Krayola demos are prime acid folk". Thompson later stated, "Those tunes on there are stuff that they had lying around in the can from the demo days. I don't know why. They never were meant as releasable material, in the usual sense. Those are archival tapes, I would say. The performances are what they are".

Lelan Rogers later mentioned that the reason there was no single to promote the record was due in part to the song "War Sucks", which he described as "controversial to say the least". Rogers remarked, "Murray the K, the DJ in New York City at W-NEW got a copy from my promotion man and he said, ‘This is what’s happening’. And he got promptly fired. He then started at W-NEW FM and they had figured they didn’t want that on AM and they were starting that station so they put it on FM."

=== Remasters and remix ===
In 1978, Andrew Lauder of Radar Records acquired the rights to the International Artists catalog and reissued The Parable of Arable Land, which was mastered by George Peckham (aka Porky). In 2008, Charly Records acquired the rights and later reissued the album. Thompson stated in 2010 that the record had never been properly reissued: "We have not authorized that stuff, and we’re in dispute with Charly over them". He also later stated "[...] the versions that are out now, I don’t hold that those are the real deal at all. They’re just like a generation off of a generation off of a generation off of a generation. It’s been licensed a number of times and there has never been a proper master of the record released. . . it’s a mess, it’s a mess".

Additionally, a re-recorded version of "Hurricane Fighter Plane" with drummer Jesse Chamberlain would be released as a flexi disc in 1978 to promote Radar's reissue. In 1999, Red Krayola's studio album Fingerpainting was centered around the same "Free Form Freak-Out" structure as their debut, with the intention that both albums could be played simultaneously. It also included outtakes written in the 1960s that originally were not featured on The Parable of Arable Land such as "Mother", "Vile Vile Grass", "There There Betty Betty" and "In My Baby's Ruth". An alternate mix of the album was made by musician Jim O'Rourke, who was a member of the band at the time, though it was rejected, until its release as Fingerpointing in 2006.

In 2011, a Sonic Boom remix of "Hurricane Fighter Plane" b/w "Pink Stainless Tail" was released in the United Kingdom on Record Store Day by Charly Records, in a limited edition of 2,000 copies.

== Critical reception ==
=== Contemporaneous ===
According to Lelan Rogers, The Parable of Arable Land originally sold 50,000 copies when it was first released and sold out its original pressing. At the time, the album was made on 600 dollars. Mayo Thompson remarked that they accomplished this with no advertising or promotion: "We sold 8-10,000 records in New York, and we sold some records in L.A., some in Frisco. Major urban centers, obviously. International Artists did not advertise. There were no band photographs. There was no promotion. This was making a virtue of your shortcomings. This was the beginnings of alternative rock". The album has been credited with predating styles such as noise rock, new wave, post-punk, art rock, punk rock, krautrock, proto-punk, garage punk, garage-psych, industrial, industrial rock, and post-rock. While the "Free Form Freak-Out" recordings have been described as free improvisation.

At the time, the Red Crayola were invited by UCLA artist Kurt Von Meier to perform at the Berkeley Folk Festival after he heard demo tapes of their cancelled follow-up album Coconut Hotel. Red Crayola would perform with guitarist John Fahey at the festival (which was later released as Live 1967). Rogers sent a stereo and mono copy of their debut album to the festival's organizer, Barry Olivier, while stating in a note that the stereo album was "better". Upon the success of the album, he stated: "The record’s an evergreen. It will always make money". However, the label had already spent the band’s share of the revenue on flying them out to Berkeley.

In July 1967, the Berkeley Barb's Ed Denson, who was also Fahey's then-manager, briefly reviewed The Parable of Arable Land in an article about the Berkeley Folk Festival: "Their first LP was released by that strange Houston company International Artists, and it is selling far more than it should be because it looks like a rock LP and the liner notes, which are deceptive, make it sound sort of like the mothers or something else which is recognizable". Denson described the Familiar Ugly tracks as "just background noise", and wrote "I like two of the cuts very much: 'War Sucks' and 'The Parable of Arable Land', and no doubt so will you about the third time thru. It took me that long."

The Chicago Seed reviewed the record on July 7, 1968, describing it as "probably the freakiest album ever recorded", with "Hurricane Fighter Plane" having "the freakiest lyrics ever" and the group making the ultimate statement on violence in "War Sucks". The article ends with a request, "highly recommended for listening to when stoned, especially for the amazing channel separation."

Record Mirror wrote about the album in 1978, noting "Transparent Radiation" as "almost a normal song" and comparing Mayo Thompson's voice to sounding "terribly like Talking Heads, David Byrne" and the song as a whole as a "total effect not unlike some Roxy Music opus, whilst "War Sucks" was spoken briefly about as an "odd raga weaving in and out".

=== Retrospective ===
Professional ratings
Review scores
Source	Rating
AllMusic	4/5 stars
Pitchfork	9.3/10
Spin Alternative Record Guide	9/10
Uncut	4/5 stars

In a retrospective review, Pitchfork critic Alex Linhardt praised The Parable of Arable Land as "one of the most visionary album[s]" of 1967, also noting that "listeners weren't sure whether the racket was the result of sharp intellectualism, sheer incompetence, or buzzed-out substance abuse." Trouser Press wrote that the album "boasts a more engaged intelligence than most of the era's aural acid baths". AllMusic remarked that "The Parable of Arable Land exists on a plane all its own; if art-damaged noise rock began anywhere, it was on this album." Additionally, he stated the album made Trout Mask Replica "sound downright normal".

In 2004, writer Steve Taylor noted the album's guitar work as a forerunner to the "more textural style later adopted by many of the post-punk bands, notably the likes of Andy Gill of the Gang of Four". Music critic Richie Unterberger described "Hurricane Fighter Plane" as being "one of the closest American approximations of Syd Barrett-era Pink Floyd.

The album was ranked number 18 on the NME's 2013 list "Top 100 Cult Albums to Hear Before You Die", number 57 on Spin magazine's "Top 100 Alternative Albums of the 1960s", and number 169 on Uncut's "the 500 Greatest Albums of the 1960s". Spin described "Transparent Radiation" as "the great-grandfather of the Spacemen 3/Spiritualized interstellar exploration division" and noted that "Hurricane Fighter Plane" had been covered many times. Record Collector described the album as "Texas nutters Red Crayola weave their wigged-out songs around freeform blasts".

In 2014, Dallas Observer stated "Parable of Arable Land, remains one of rock's most radical statements: thirteen tracks of art-ravaged pop and improvisational thunder that foresaw, not only all of DIY, noise and jazz rock, but also the blistering ferocity of Iggy Pop and the oblique eccentricities of Captain Beefheart". BrooklynVegan wrote in 2017, "It is a mesmerizing piece of work that is still startling to this day. Some have called it the American version of Piper at the Gates of Dawn which I wouldn’t say is too far fetched. Way ahead of its time."

== Track listing ==
The songs on side A and side B are the same for both mono and stereo versions; however, on the original LP, each song following the "Free Form Freak-Out" tracks is marked with a lengthy subtitle taken from the songs lyrics (except for the title track which is an instrumental sound collage and instead has its own special text). In 2011, Peter Kember (otherwise known as "Sonic Boom") would remaster the album at New Atlantis studios from the original master tapes as part of a deluxe reissue.

In the 2011 Sonic Boom remaster, there are only 12 tracks displayed in the first disc, as the "Free Form Freak-Out" following War Sucks is added as part of the song. The bonus tracks consist of recordings from the band's March 1967 demo session at Walt Andrus studio, as well as Sonic Boom's alternate mixes for tracks.

All tracks are written by Frederick Barthelme, Steve Cunningham and Mayo Thompson.

Side A
No.	Title	Length
1.	"Free Form Freak-Out"	1:30
2.	"Hurricane Fighter Plane" (subtitled "When the Ride Is Over You Can Go to Sleep")	3:34
3.	"Free Form Freak-Out"	2:22
4.	"Transparent Radiation" (subtitled "Red Signs Out-Side, Which I Contain")	2:34
5.	"Free Form Freak-Out"	4:18
6.	"War Sucks" (subtitled "You Remember What Happened to Hansel and Gretel")	3:52
7.	"Free Form Freak-Out"	2:44

Side B
No.	Title	Length
1.	"Free Form Freak-Out"	1:46
2.	"Pink Stainless Tail" (subtitled "Seven Guest Are Quite Now, And Now Not Half So Much")	3:21
3.	"Free Form Freak-Out"	3:02
4.	"Parable of Arable Land" (subtitled "And the End Shall Be Signaled By the Breaking of a Twig")	3:03
5.	"Free Form Freak-Out"	4:10
6.	"Former Reflections Enduring Doubt" (subtitled "I Pass in a Rain That Is Always Too Soon")	4:55
Total length:		41:17

2011 Sonic Boom Remaster Bonus Tracks
No.	Title	Length
13.	"Nickle Niceness (Demo of 'Green of My Pants')"	2:57
14.	"Vile, Vile Grass (Demo of 'War Sucks')"	2:13
15.	"Transparent Radiation (Demo)"	2:45
16.	"Pink Stainless Tail (Alternate Version)"	3:25
17.	"Hurricane Fighter Plane (Alternate Stereo Mix)"	3:48
18.	"Former Reflections, Enduring Doubt (Altermate Stereo Edit & Mix)"	2:06
Total length:		58:11

== Legacy ==
Jimi Hendrix owned a copy of The Parable of Arable Land - Kathy Etchingham believes that Hendrix picked up the album on an impulse because the cover artwork was similar in style to his own drawings.

The Parable of Arable Land was selected by Andrew VanWyngarden of MGMT for inclusion in NME's 2011 list of "The 100 Greatest Albums You've Never Heard". He added, "I was pretty blown away by the fact that people were making sounds before Piper At The Gates Of Dawn and all the other ‘classic’ psychedelic albums, and that the sounds were being made by guys in Texas doing shitloads of LSD and making these completely wild records. I think it’s good that more people listen to them, because they go unheralded a lot of the time".

In his memoir, Primal Scream's Bobby Gillespie stated he "loved" the tracks "Hurricane Fighter Plane" and "Transparent Radiation", which led to him employing Mayo Thompson as a producer for his debut album Sonic Flower Groove, after work with Stephen Street did not please the band.

Spacemen 3 recorded a version of "Transparent Radiation", and Spectrum, fronted by ex–Spacemen 3 member Peter Kember, released an EP with a cover of "War Sucks" as the title track. David Berman of Silver Jews cited the record as a favorite, as well as Zachary Cole Smith of DIIV and Todd Tamanend Clark. Irish radio broadcaster Joe S. Harrington featured the LP on his "top 100 albums of all time" list.

Osees borrowed the bass riff of "Hurricane Fighter Plane" for their song "Block of Ice". Frontman John Dwyer remarked: "Block of Ice was obviously inspired by Red Krayola. We were doing a show with them, and have always loved them [...] When we opened with it at the show, they ended up doing 'Hurricane Fighter Plane' for like 15 minutes. Pretty rad."

Artists such as the Cramps and Alien Sex Fiend would cover "Hurricane Fighter Plane". Other notable artists who covered the song include the Pastels, Nik Turner (Inner City Unit) and the Pin Group. While Really Red and Barkmarket covered "War Sucks" and "Pink Stainless Tail".

In 2013, producer Madlib sampled "Former Reflections Enduring Doubt" on the track "Centauri".

Lenny Kaye of the Patti Smith Group, who produced the '60s garage rock compilation Nuggets, had referenced the album's liner notes, stating: "I'm a person who resists definitions. I believe that, as Mayo Thompson of the Red Krayola once said on one of those International Artists records, 'Definitions define limit'. I’ve always looked for those moments in time where definitions are blurry and that to me is what’s really nice about Nuggets is that the bands hadn’t figured it out yet, so you had a lot of wild cards."

Pink Stainless Tail were a rock band formed in 2000 in Melbourne, Australia, who named themselves after the song.

In 2020, Cindy Lee's Patrick Flegel stated in a Reddit AMA that they had been listening to The Parable of Arable Land. Flegel featured the song "Pink Stainless Tail" on their Realistik Radio show in 2021.

== Personnel ==
The Red Crayola

- Frederick Barthelme – drums
- Steve Cunningham – bass guitar
- Mayo Thompson – guitar, vocals

The Familiar Ugly (2011 CD Reissue liner notes)

- Haydn Larson – spoons
- Roger Hamilton AKA William West
- Butch Caraban
- Pete Black (possibly)
- Pat Pritchett
- Pat Conley
- Danny Schwartz
- Barbara (Potter) Metyko
- Alicia Garza
- Linda Linda
- Donald Pick
- Elaine Banks
- Sara Quigles
- David Potter's Wife
- Joe Pritchett
- Dennis Glomm
- Ian Glennie
- Larry Frost
- Skip Gerson
- Helena or Helene (Skip Gerson's Girlfriend)
- Mike Metyko AKA F.R.B Rapho
- George Farrar AKA Red
- Bill Smith
- Carolyn Heinman (possibly)
- Johndavid Bartlett
- Frank Simmons
- Steve Webb

Additional personnel

- Roky Erickson – organ ("Hurricane Fighter Plane"), harmonica ("Transparent Radiation")

Technical

- Lelan Rogers – production
- Walt Andrus – engineering
- Frank Davis – engineering
- George Banks (Flash Graphics) – cover art

== Release history ==
Region	Date	Title	Label	Format	Catalog
USA	1967	The Parable of Arable Land	International Artists	Stereo LP	IA-LP 2 STEREO
USA	1967	The Parable of Arable Land	International Artists	Mono LP	IA-LP 2 MONO
UK	1978	The Parable of Arable Land	Radar Records	Stereo LP	RAD 12
USA	1979	The Parable of Arable Land	International Artists	Stereo LP	IA-LP 2 STEREO
UK	1988	The Parable of Arable Land	Decal	CD	LIK 20
USA	1993	The Parable of Arable Land	Collectables	CD	COL-CD-0551
Italy	1999	The Parable of Arable Land	Get Back	LP	GET533
Italy	2002	The Parable of Arable Land	Sunspots	CD	SPOT 507
USA	2009	The Parable of Arable Land	International Artists	Stereo/Mono LP	IA-LP-2 Mono
UK	2011	The Parable of Arable Land	Charly Records	CD	SNAX621
UK	2011	The Parable of Arable Land	Charly Records	MP3 (Stereo/Mono)	SNAX621
UK	2014	The Parable of Arable Land	Charly Records	Stereo/Mono LP	CHARLY L 142

^aThis release includes extensive liner notes, including interviews and photographs

== Bibliography ==
- Graham, Ben (2015). A Gathering of Promises: The Battle for Texas's Psychedelic Music, from The 13th Floor Elevators to The Black Angels and Beyond. Zero Books. ISBN 978-1782790945.
- Lauder, Andrew; Houghton, Mick (2023). Happy Trails: Andrew Lauder's Charmed Life and High Times in the Record Business. White Rabbit. ISBN 978-1474623599.
- Drummond, Paul (2007). Eye Mind: Roky Erickson and the 13th Floor Elevators. Process. ISBN 978-0976082262.
- Keenan, David (2025). Volcanic Tongue: A Time-Travelling Evangelist’s Guide to Late 20th-Century Underground Music. White Rabbit. ISBN 978-1399624947.
- Taylor, Steve (2006). The A to X of Alternative Music. Continuum. ISBN 978-0826482174.

^aThis release includes extensive liner notes, including interviews and photographs
