= Amor and Language =

EP by Red Krayola
- Released: June 3, 1995
- Genre: Experimental rock
- Length: 28:43
- Label: Drag City

Red Krayola chronology
Coconut Hotel (1995)	Amor and Language (1995)	Hazel (1996)

Amor and Language is an EP by the experimental rock band Red Krayola, released in 1995 by Drag City.

Model Rachel Williams posed for the album's cover.

== Critical reception ==
Professional ratings
Review scores
Source	Rating
AllMusic	3/5 stars

CMJ New Music Monthly called the EP an "opportunity to observe a venturesome mind and his talented entourage." AllMusic wrote that "this is about as gentle as '90s experimental rock gets, and not without its pleasing riffs here and there."

== Track listing ==
No.	Title	Length
1.	"Hard On Through the Summer"	2:29
2.	"The Ballad of Younis and Sofia"	4:33
3.	"Luster"	2:21
4.	"Ai"	2:43
5.	"T (I, II)"	5:48
6.	"A-A-Allegories"	2:03
7.	"The Wind"	3:14
8.	"Stil de grain brun"	2:09
9.	"The Letter"	3:23

== Personnel ==
- Consuelo & Meme
- Tricia Donnelly
- John Elder
- David Grubbs
- George Hurley
- Margo Leavin
- Steve Linn
- Sharon Lockhart
- John McEntire
- Albert Oehlen
- Jim O'Rourke
- Stephen Prina
- Franz Schnaas
- Alex Slade
- Mayo Thompson
- Tom Watson
- Christopher Williams
- Rachel Williams
- Steven Wong
