= Hazel (album) =

Studio album by Red Krayola
- Released: November 19, 1996
- Genre: Experimental rock
- Length: 51:10
- Label: Drag City

Red Krayola chronology
Amor and Language (1995)	Hazel (1996)	Live 1967 (1998)

Hazel is an album by the experimental rock band Red Krayola, released in 1996 by Drag City.

== Critical reception ==
Professional ratings
Review scores
Source	Rating
AllMusic	3/5 stars
Alternative Press	5/5 stars
The Austin Chronicle	3/4 stars
The Encyclopedia of Popular Music	3/5 stars
Entertainment Weekly	A−
Rolling Stone	3.5/5 stars

The Austin Chronicle wrote that "although a lot of Hazel is presented in a cut-and-paste carnival of strange narratives, short bursts of guitar/synthesizer, and bold U-turns galore, songs like 'I'm So Blasé' and 'Larking' capture the same infinite pop energy Chris Bell once reigned in." Magnet wrote that it possessed "a leaner, more subtle weirdness than previous records."

== Track listing ==
No.	Title	Length
1.	"I'm So Blase"	2:31
2.	"Duck & Cover"	1:53
3.	"Duke of Newcastle"	4:14
4.	"Decaf the Planet"	2:12
5.	"GAO"	3:21
6.	"Larking"	3:31
7.	"Jimmy Two Bad"	3:38
8.	"Falls"	4:56
9.	"We Feel Fine"	2:49
10.	"5123881"	2:34
11.	"Hollywood"	1:14
12.	"Another Song, Another Satan"	3:01
13.	"Boogie"	3:58
14.	"Dad"	3:36
15.	"Father Abraham"	4:14
16.	"Serenade"	3:28

== Personnel ==
- Werner Büttner
- Michael Baldwin
- David Grubbs
- George Hurley
- Lynn Johnston
- Hei Han Khiang
- John McEntire
- Albert Oehlen
- Jim O'Rourke
- Stephen Prina
- Elisa Randazzo
- Mary Lass Stewart
- Mayo Thompson
- Tom Watson
- Christopher Williams
