= Fingerpointing (album) =

Remix album by The Red Krayola
- Released: July 22, 2008
- Genre: Experimental rock
- Length: 34:45
- Label: Drag City

The Red Krayola chronology
Sighs Trapped by Liars (2007)	Fingerpointing (2008)	Five American Portraits (2010)

Professional ratings
Review scores
Source	Rating
Alternative Press	4/5 stars
Pitchfork Media	(6.0/10)
Tiny Mix Tapes	3/5 stars

Fingerpointing is a remix album by the experimental rock band Red Krayola, released on July 22, 2008, by Drag City. It is a remix of the album Fingerpainting, with Jim O'Rourke responsible for the new mix.

== Critical reception ==
Exclaim! praised O'Rourke's "striking use of space," writing that the producer "puts [Mayo] Thompson's voice and guitar low in the mix and lets a sparse array of skittering beats and synths carry the album."

== Track listing ==
No.	Title	Length
1.	"Freeform Freakout 0/Bad Medecine/Freeform Freakout 1/There There Betty Betty/Freeform Freakout 2/Freeform Freakout 3/In My Baby's Ruth/Freeform Freakout 4"	34:45

== Personnel ==
- Frederick Barthelme
- Steve Cunningham
- David Grubbs
- Bobby Henschen
- George Hurley
- Albert Oehlen
- Jim O'Rourke
- Stephen Prina
- Elisa Randazzo
- Mayo Thompson
- Tom Watson
- Sandy Yang
