= Soldier-Talk =

Studio album by the Red Crayola
- Released: 1979
- Genre: Post-punk; experimental rock
- Length: 35:45
- Label: Radar (original UK release); Drag City (2007 US reissue)
- Producer: Mayo Thompson, Geoff Travis

The Red Crayola chronology
Corrected Slogans (1976)	Soldier-Talk (1979)	Kangaroo? (1981)

Soldier-Talk is the third studio album by the American experimental rock band Red Crayola. It was released in 1979 by the record label Radar.

== Background ==
In 1977, band leader Mayo Thompson moved from Houston to London where he partnered with drummer Jesse Chamberlain. The band signed to Radar Records, and they started touring Europe. Thompson met Pere Ubu, who were touring in support of The Modern Dance, and struck up a friendship. Thompson recruited Pere Ubu for this album project, and also Lora Logic of X-Ray Spex/Essential Logic.

== Composition ==
Despite the presence of Pere Ubu, the music is a close continuation of the sound previously established by the Red Crayola. Soldier-Talk was conceived as a concept album dealing with militarism.

Chamberlain wanted to veer the music towards a more pop-oriented direction while Thompson opted to keep the sound experimental. As Thompson explained, "There wasn't much for him to do, in a way, I think he wanted to say what he felt about the record, and he wanted it closer in the direction of pop, because Jesse, that's always been one of his gifts, and I was determined to make the record work, and thought that it could, and should, and working with Geoff Travis, using his insights into the way music works, there was no other way it could be..." The conflict caused a strain on their musical partnership, although they later worked again on another record in a similar vein, Three Songs on a Trip to the United States, the cover of which referenced Soldier-Talk.

== Release ==
Soldier-Talk was released in 1979. Around the release of the album, Mayo Thompson became an active producer for many of the bands on the Rough Trade roster, including Stiff Little Fingers, the Fall and the Raincoats. He also became a member of Pere Ubu, filling the spot left after Tom Herman's departure, and recorded the albums The Art of Walking and Song of the Bailing Man with the group.

== Critical reception ==
Professional ratings
Review scores
Source	Rating
AllMusic	3/5 stars
Pitchfork	5.3/10
Spin Alternative Record Guide	8/10

The Harrow Observer wrote that "this is undisciplined, wild-running, absolutely anarchic music... Listen, and be devastated."

Thom Jurek of AllMusic declared it "among the loopiest of the Red Krayola's offerings", and representative of "post-punk's more musically adventurous side". He described the songs as being independently compelling and engaging. Mark Pytlik of Pitchfork was critical of the overall abrasiveness of the music, writing, "It's a consistently interesting album – there's something trying to get your attention at every moment, but in the manner of a beloved little sibling who won't stop poking you." He concluded that the record was best suited for those who find Gang of Four's Entertainment! too subdued.

== Legacy ==
The bass guitarist Mike Watt of the Minutemen named Soldier-Talk one of his favorite rock albums.

Charles Hayward of This Heat liked the album, stating, "I had loved the Soldier-Talk era stuff, their thing of doing a song with no bass player on, because if you've not got someone who plays the instrument, then fuck it."

== Track listing ==
All tracks are written by Mayo Thompson, except "On the Brink" by Thompson and Jesse Chamberlain.

Side A
No.	Title	Length
1.	"March No.12"	2:01
2.	"On the Brink"	2:55
3.	"Letter-Bomb"	2:03
4.	"Conspirator's Oath"	2:41
5.	"March No.14"	1:22
6.	"Soldier-Talk"	7:06

Side B
No.	Title	Length
1.	"Discipline"	3:25
2.	"X"	3:13
3.	"An Opposition Spokesman"	5:02
4.	"Uh, Knowledge Dance"	2:57
5.	"Wonderland"	3:00

== Personnel ==
The Red Crayola

- Mayo Thompson – vocals, guitar, production
- Jesse Chamberlain – drums

Additional musicians

- Dick Cuthell – trumpet
- Tom Herman – guitar
- Scott Krauss – drums
- Lora Logic – saxophone
- Tony Maimone – bass guitar
- Allen Ravenstine – keyboards
- David Thomas – vocals

Additional personnel

- Christine Thompson – additional vocals

Technical

- Bob Broglia – engineering, mixing
- Alan Jakoby – engineering
- Stephen Lipson – engineering
- Geoff Travis – production
