= Introduction (Red Krayola album) =

Studio album by the Red Krayola
- Released: April 18, 2006
- Recorded: August 2005
- Studios: Soma E.M.S., Chicago, Illinois
- Genres: Psychedelic rock, freak folk
- Length: 51:50
- Label: Drag City
- Producer: Drag City

The Red Krayola chronology
Japan in Paris in L.A. (2004)	Introduction (2006)	Red Gold (2006)

Introduction is an album by the experimental rock band Red Krayola, released in 2006 via Drag City.

== Critical reception ==
Professional ratings
Aggregate scores
Source	Rating
Metacritic	70/100
Review scores
Source	Rating
AllMusic	4.5/5 stars
Mojo	3/5 stars
NME	1/10 stars
Pitchfork	8.0/10
Slant Magazine	4/5 stars
Uncut	4/5 stars

The Austin Chronicle called the album a "highly eclectic glide through folk, blues, electronic, and post-punk." Magnet wrote: "With Introduction, Thompson and Co. take on Americana 21st-century style, pushing the oddities of past albums to the background while emphasizing melody and giving free range to Thompson’s warm-yet-eerie comments on shark attacks and unbroken circles." CMJ New Music Monthly called it "further proof that Thompson is one of the few geniuses demented enough to have never suffered growing pains."

== Track listing ==
All lyrics are written by Mayo Thompson; all music is composed by the Red Krayola.

No.	Title	Length
1.	"Introduction"	0:55
2.	"Breakout"	5:03
3.	"Cruise Boat"	2:26
4.	"Note to Selves"	3:37
5.	"L.F.G."	5:07
6.	"A Tale of Two"	3:26
7.	"Psy Ops"	2:18
8.	"It Will Be (Delivered)"	3:02
9.	"Puff"	1:59
10.	"Greasy Street"	4:24
11.	"Vexations"	4:27
12.	"Elegy"	5:17
13.	"When She Went Swimming"	3:54
14.	"Swerving"	2:42
15.	"Bling Bling"	3:13

== Personnel ==
Red Krayola

- John McEntire – drums, synthesizer, ukulele, mixing, recording
- Stephen Prina – guitar, harpsichord, piano, organ, tambourine, vocals
- Mayo Thompson – vocals, guitar
- Tom Watson – bass guitar, guitar, harpsichord, synthesizer, vocals

Additional musicians and production

- Charlie Abel – accordion
- Drag City – production
- Noel Kupersmith – bass guitar, photography
- Dan Osborne – illustration
- Roger Seibel – mastering
- Chris Strong – photography
