= Malefactor, Ade =

Studio album by Red Krayola
- Released: 1989
- Genre: Alternative rock
- Length: 30:53
- Labels: Glass (original release); Drag City (reissue)

Red Krayola chronology
Three Songs on a Trip to the United States (1983)	Malefactor, Ade (1989)	The Red Krayola (1994)

Malefactor, Ade is the fifth album by the American band Red Krayola, released in 1989 by Glass Records. The album was reissued by Drag City in 2000.

== Critical reception ==
Professional ratings
Review scores
Source	Rating
AllMusic	2.5/5 stars
The Encyclopedia of Popular Music	2/5 stars
Pitchfork Media	1.5/10
Spin Alternative Record Guide	8/10

The Spin Alternative Record Guide praised the "lovely, scrambled warmth" of the album's sound, and called it a "moistly humanistic piece of work."

== Track listing ==
Side one
No.	Title	Length
1.	"Extremism"	2:20
2.	"Baby Jesus Frog"	2:19
3.	"Blue Jeans"	1:08
4.	"Steve McQueen's Garden"	2:12
5.	"Colour Theory, No. 4"	2:24
6.	"Franz Von Assisi"	3:19
7.	"Sex Machine"	1:23
8.	"The Coaster"	2:39
9.	"Break a Leg"	2:23
10.	"T.B. - Tissues"	2:37
11.	"Dope"	1:11

Side two
No.	Title	Length
1.	"The Alma Fanfare"	2:36
2.	"Colour Theory, No. 3"	4:22

== Personnel ==
Red Krayola

- Albert Oehlen
- Mayo Thompson

Additional musicians and production

- Werner Büttner
- Rudinger Carl
- Andreas Dorau
