= Singles (Red Krayola album) =

Compilation album by The Red Krayola
- Released: July 27, 2004
- Recorded: 1968 – 2002
- Genre: Experimental rock
- Length: 75:19
- Label: Drag City

The Red Krayola chronology
Blues, Hollers and Hellos (2000)	Singles (2004)	Japan in Paris in L.A. (2004)

Professional ratings
Review scores
Source	Rating
AllMusic	4.5/5 stars
The Encyclopedia of Popular Music	4/5 stars
NME	8/10 stars
Uncut	2/5 stars

Singles is a compilation album by the experimental rock band Red Krayola. It was released in 2004 by Drag City.

The tracks "Wives In Orbit" and "Yik-Yak" included here are not the studio versions issued on the Radar 7" single but previously unreleased live recordings. The tracks "An Old Man's Dream" and "The Milkmaid" are the same recordings included in the album Kangaroo? Left off the collection are the three remixes of "Father Abraham" from the 12" single and the A-side mix of "Stil De Grain Brun" from the 7" single.

== Critical reception ==
Paste wrote that "the best of it captures the cool detachment and rabid experimentalism that makes Thompson a truly unique case."

== Track listing ==
All tracks are written by Mayo Thompson, except where noted.

No.	Title	Writer(s)	Artist (date)	Length
1.	"Woof"		Mayo Thompson (1970)	5:03
2.	"Old Tom Clark"		Saddlesore (1970)	4:04
3.	"Pig Ankle Strut"		Saddlesore (1970)	2:40
4.	"Wives in Orbit"		The Red Krayola (1978)	3:00
5.	"Yik Yak"	Cunningham, Thompson	The Red Krayola (1978)	4:13
6.	"Micro-Chips & Fish"		The Red Krayola (1979)	6:16
7.	"The Story So Far"		The Red Krayola (1979)	6:07
8.	"Born in Flames"	Baldwin, Thompson	The Red Krayola (1980)	3:33
9.	"The Sword of God"		The Red Krayola (1980)	3:03
10.	"An Old Man's Dream"		The Red Krayola with Art & Language (1981)	2:26
11.	"The Milkmaid"		The Red Krayola with Art & Language (1981)	1:58
12.	"Rattenmensch: Gewichtswächter"		The Red Krayola with Art & Language (1981)	2:47
13.	"Zukunftsfleiger"		The Red Krayola with Art & Language (1981)	4:25
14.	"The Red Crayola on Forty-Five (Think, Our Guitars Are Hot, Money)"	Oehlen, Thompson	The Red Krayola (1993)	3:47
15.	"Your Body Is Hot"	Oehlen, Thompson	The Red Krayola (1993)	3:17
16.	"4Teen"	Oehlen, Thompson	The Red Krayola (1994)	3:26
17.	"Stink Program"	Grubbs, Thompson	The Red Krayola (1994)	3:10
18.	"Chemistry"	Oehlen, Thompson	The Red Krayola (1996)	2:34
19.	"Farewell to Arms"		The Red Krayola (1996)	2:56
20.	"Come on Down"		The Red Krayola (1999)	4:37
21.	"Stil De Grain Brun (Radio Edit)"	Oehlen, Thompson	The Red Krayola (2002)	2:08
