= Red Krayola =

American band

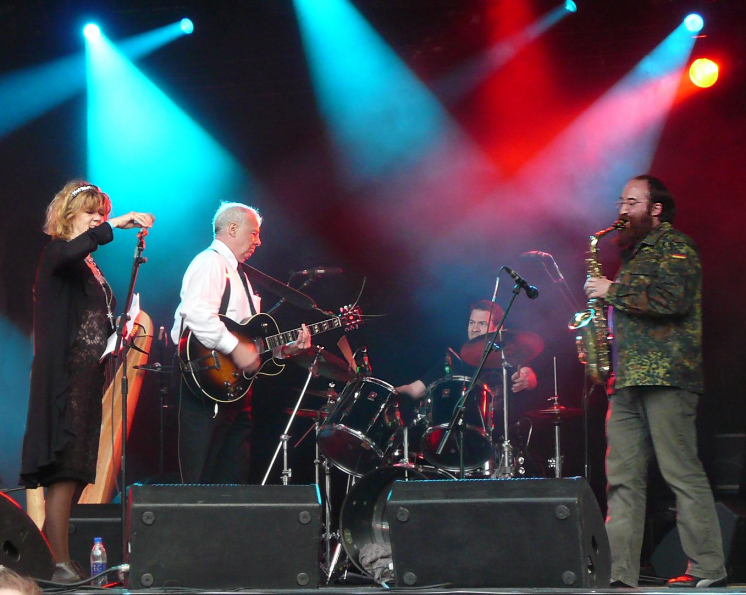
- Red Krayola at Somerset house in London, July 2008

Background information
- Also known as: The Red Crayola, The Red Krayola
- Origin: Houston, Texas, US
- Genres: Experimental rock; psychedelic rock; post-punk; art punk
- Years active: 1966–present
- Labels: International Artists; Rough Trade; Recommended; Celluloid; Leiterwagen; Radar; Sordide Sentimental; Drag City
- Members: Mayo Thompson; Tom Watson; Bill Bowman; Connor Gallaher; Raul Morales
- Past members: Guy Clark; Mike Driscoll; Fred McLain; Bonnie Emerson; Danny Schacht; Frederick Barthelme; Steve Cunningham; Tommy Smith; Jesse Chamberlain; Lora Logic; Allen Ravenstine; Markus Oehlen; Epic Soundtracks; Gina Birch; David Grubbs; John McEntire; Jim O'Rourke; Stephen Prina; George Hurley; Elisa Randazzo; Sandy Yang; Christopher Williams; Lynn Johnston; Mary Lass Stewart; Werner Büttner; Hei Han Khiang; Bobby Henschen; Michael Baldwin; Ben Annesley; Chris Taylor; Chris White; Andreas Dorau; Rüdiger Carl; Alex Dower; Tom Rogerson; Charlie Abel; Noel Kupersmith; Dick Cuthell; Albert Oehlen

Red Krayola (originally Red Crayola) is an American rock band from Houston, Texas formed in 1966 by the trio of singer/guitarist Mayo Thompson, drummer Frederick Barthelme, and bassist Steve Cunningham.

The group was initially part of the 1960s Texas psychedelic music scene and were signed to International Artists. After the release of The Parable of Arable Land and God Bless the Red Krayola and All Who Sail With It, the group disbanded. At the time, they recorded unreleased albums such as Coconut Hotel, alongside a lost collaboration with musician John Fahey which was recorded after the band performed with him at the Berkeley Folk Festival. Their performance was released as Live 1967.

During the late 1970s, the group reformed in England as a two-piece with Thompson and drummer Jesse Chamberlain. Radar Records reissued the band's original material, which led to the release of Soldier-Talk, as well as Thompson working with Geoff Travis and his label Rough Trade Records. The group later underwent various lineup changes, featuring artists such as Allen Ravenstine, Epic Soundtracks, Lora Logic and Gina Birch, as well as collaborative releases with conceptual art group Art & Language such as Kangaroo? and Black Snakes. In the mid-1980s, Thompson moved to Germany and collaborated with artist Albert Oehlen on the album Malefactor, Ade.

By the early to mid-1990s, Thompson returned to the United States and signed to Drag City Records with a new lineup involving members from the Chicago post-rock scene. During the 2000s and 2010s, the band continued to collaborate with Art & Language and release several albums. In 2025, Red Krayola performed new material live for the first time in over a decade at the Hollywood Palladium in Los Angeles.

== History ==
=== 1960s ===
The Red Crayola was formed in Houston, Texas, by Mayo Thompson and Frederick Barthelme at the University of St. Thomas in mid-July 1966. Thompson was inspired to form the band after a trip to Europe in 1965. Barthelme and Thompson initially met in 1963 and later collaborated on 16mm films which they disposed of after forming the band. According to Barthelme, Red Crayola was "a name we took as a sort of parody of the clever California band names of that moment, a name that had come to us while trailing down Main Street in my roofless (courtesy of the sculptor Jim Love) blue Fiat" the name was also a homage to Thompson's mother Hazel's career as an art teacher. After briefly playing with Fred McLain, Guy Clark, Mike Driscoll and a friend of Luana Anderson. The band settled on Steve Cunningham (who previously collaborated with Malachi on the 'Holy Music' album in California) as their bassist, who joined the band in September alongside his friends, female guitarist Bonnie Emerson and harmonica player Danny Schacht.

By late 1966, the band got a gig (with the help of Luana Anderson) at Mark Froman's club called Love, which became their main place to perform. They primarily covered songs such as "Louie Louie", "Colored Balls Falling", "Midnight Hour", "Gloria", "Group Grope", "The House of the Rising Sun", "Eight Miles High" and "Hey Joe". After a Red Crayola performance in which Froman came on stage accompanied by audience members, the group began to incorporate improvised compositions dubbed "free pieces". These pieces became a staple part of the band's live performances, which garnered them notoriety from clubs and venues as they were never booked twice. By December, the band shifted towards purely original material, with Thompson firing Emerson, alongside Schacht who replied, "That's OK, your music is ontologically unsound anyway". The group performed other local venues such as the Catacombs, the Vault, Love Street Light Circus and Feelgood Machine.

In early 1967, as their membership grew, every additional performer in the band became regarded as a member of a secondary group called "the Familiar Ugly". In February, the Red Crayola recorded the single "Dairymaid's Lament" b/w "Free Piece", the session was produced by Bob Steffek, who approached the band for an unreleased single when he saw them perform their song "Mother" at a club in Houston. Steffek had a hit on Shazam Records with "Wild Woody", and owned a short-lived independent label called "Steffek Records". Following this, the band performed at the Gulfgate Mall for local radio station KNUZ's "Battle of the Bands", where they were discovered by International Artists producer, Lelan Rogers, the brother of Kenny Rogers, who signed the band and invited them to record a demo session at Walt Andrus studio in March.

In April and May, the band recorded their debut album, The Parable of Arable Land released in June 1967, which featured instrumental cameos from 13th Floor Elevators frontman Roky Erickson. The Familiar Ugly appear primarily on tracks labelled "Free Form Freak-Out". Shortly after, they recorded their follow-up album, Coconut Hotel, but it was rejected by the label for its lack of commercial potential and not be released until 1995. However, former UCLA professor Kurt Von Meier heard the demo tapes and invited the band to perform at the Berkeley Folk Music Festival. During this period, in late June and early July, they performed concerts in Berkeley, California, and Los Angeles. Their music involved purely free improvisational guitar feedback, which audience members linked to the death of a dog due to its sheer volume.

Additionally, Red Crayola also performed with guitarist John Fahey. These performances are captured on Live 1967. The band later opened for Fahey at the New Orleans House that same month. Their performance emptied out the venue and they were paid 10 dollars to stop performing. Fahey later recorded a studio album with the band produced by his manager Ed Denson, but due to it breaching International Artists' record contract, the label demanded possession of the master tapes and threatened to not fly the band back to Texas. The master tapes were later lost.

By late 1967, drummer Rick Barthelme left the band to pursue conceptual art and literature in New York. Mayo Thompson felt at "loose ends" with the label and remained in California, where he worked with Joseph Byrd of the United States of America in Los Angeles as a sound engineer. Byrd had previously sat in at early Red Krayola rehearsals and considered Thompson joining his band if only he could "sightread". A few months later, International Artists contacted Thompson about recording a new Red Crayola album, as The Parable of Arable Land had become an unexpected success. The record had sold over 50,000 copies, selling out its original pressing. Lelan Rogers stated: "The record’s an evergreen. It will always make money". However, the label had already spent the band’s share of the revenue on flying them out to Berkeley.

In February 1968, the Red Crayola reformed with drummer Tommy Smith who had previously performed in the San Antonio band Bubble Puppy. Around this time, the band received a cease and desist letter from Binney & Smith, the company which manufactured Crayola crayons, over the band's name, resulting in the legally altered spelling to "Red Krayola". Their second album God Bless the Red Krayola and All Who Sail With It was released in May 1968, with International Artists promoting the record with posters, radio spots and a planned tour. However, upon release it was not as well received as their debut, selling only around 6,000 copies and being dismissed by most critics. The tour was cancelled and drummer Tommy Smith left the band after being needed elsewhere.

Greek composer Manos Hatzidakis became a huge fan of the record and played it for his associate Isaac Stern. Hatzidakis later invited Mayo Thompson and Steve Cunningham to New York to discuss a project titled "Opera for Five", which was an intended rock opera, involving Emitt Rhodes or Grace Slick of Jefferson Airplane as lead singers, with the Red Krayola as the backing band. Due to Hatzidakis busy schedule, the project did not pan out. He would later cover the song "Sherlock Holmes".

In 1969, International Artists folded after several failed releases, though experienced a brief hit with Bubble Puppy's "Hot Smoke and Sassafras". The Red Krayola disbanded with Mayo Thompson pursuing other projects while Cunningham left the band to study linguistics in Vienna.

=== 1970s–1980s ===
In 1970, Thompson released his solo album Corky's Debt to His Father on Walt Andrus' label Texas Revolution. Later, Thompson and Barthelme formed a short-lived Houston band called Saddlesore with Cassell Webb; the trio released one single on Texas Revolution, "Old Tom Clark" b/w "Pig Ankle Strut". (Later featured on the 2004 Red Krayola singles compilation, which also featured "Woof" an unreleased demo from Corky's Debt) Subsequently, the label folded and the band split up.

At this time, Thompson left the music business to pursue other projects. In 1971, he met Mel Ramsden of conceptual art collective Art & Language, and later joined the group in 1973. He described them as "the baddest bastards on the block". By 1974, the group began recording the album Corrected Slogans which was released in 1976 and later reissued as a Red Krayola with Art & Language album in 1982. The record featured drummer Jesse Chamberlain, the son of sculptor John Chamberlain and Lorraine Belcher Chamberlain (Frank Zappa's ex-girlfriend). By the late 1970s, Thompson moved to England, and returned to the group's original name, "Red Crayola", as American copyright laws did not apply in the UK.

At the time, musicians were beginning to rediscover the International Artists catalog, which led music executive Andrew Lauder to acquire the rights to the label's material and reissue them under Radar Records. Lauder also put out new releases by the Red Crayola, which included the single "Wives in Orbit" b/w "Yik-Yak", a re-recording of "Hurricane Fighter Plane", and the album Soldier Talk, with the latter featuring cameos by Lora Logic of Essential Logic and X-Ray Spex, as well as members of Pere Ubu. However, after discovering that Radar's parent company, WEA Records, was linked to the Kinney National Company, which was funding the arms trade, Thompson left Radar and informed Mark Stewart of the Pop Group, who also decided to leave.

At the time, Red Crayola toured England with Pere Ubu which led to Thompson later joining the band. English post-punk group Gang of Four also invited the Red Crayola to tour and open for them at shows. Chamberlain left the group in late 1979 to work with Arthur Russell's group the Necessaries. Red Crayola reformed as a "Rough Trade supergroup", with the Raincoats' Gina Birch, Lora Logic of Essential Logic and X-Ray Spex, along with Swell Maps' Epic Soundtracks. They released the EP Micro-Chips and Fish which Radar didn't want to release, which led to the band signing to Rough Trade. Upon release, British DJ John Peel criticized the single stating, "If Rough Trade were to keep putting out these kind of singles, they'd go out of business". He later stated on the show that he was met with a "disgruntled" phone call from Thompson after the broadcast.

By the 1980s, the Red Crayola released further collaborative works with Art & Language including Kangaroo? (1981) and the single "Born in Flames" (later used in Lizzie Borden's film of the same name). Music critic Simon Reynolds notes Thompson clashing ideologically with Green Gartside of Scritti Politti at Rough Trade, with Reynolds noting Gartside criticized the label for frittering their money on "silly music", meaning Pere Ubu and Red Krayola, rather than trying to get Scritti Politti on the charts.

In 1982, under a different lineup of the band, the label refused to put out the Red Krayola album Black Snakes (1983), leading to Thompson releasing the LP on RecRec Music. At around the same time, the group recorded Baby and Child Care, the album was not released until 2016. Thompson later moved to Germany and collaborated with painter Albert Oehlen (who later joined the band). Red Crayola performed at the Bismarckstrasse, 50 which was later released as Three Songs on a Trip to the United States. In 1986, he recorded tracks with Oehlen for a cancelled album entitled Scheibenzweifel (Disco Doubt). The recordings were released as Malefactor, Ade (1989).

=== 1990s–2020s ===
By the early 1990s, the Red Crayola experienced a brief hiatus, only to be revived by musicians associated with Chicago's post-rock scene such as Jim O'Rourke and David Grubbs of Gastr del Sol, Tom Watson of Slovenly and John McEntire of Tortoise. These artists cited the band's work as an influence, with Grubbs persuading Thompson to return to the United States and sign to the independent record label Drag City. The band was later accompanied by drummer George Hurley (formerly of Minutemen and Firehose).

In America, the band returned to their altered spelling (Red Krayola), and released albums such as The Red Krayola (1994) produced by Steve Albini, Hazel (1996), Fingerpainting (1999) and several singles. Fingerpainting consisted of songs that did not make it on The Parable of Arable Land and was centered around that album's "Free Form Freak-Out" structure. Albert Oehlen suggested both records to be played at the same time. An alternate mix of the album was originally made by guitarist Jim O'Rourke but it would not be used until 2008 when it was released as Fingerpointing. Red Krayola was later joined by post-conceptual visual artist Stephen Prina, Sandy Yang and Elisa Randazzo. In 2006, the group released the album, Introduction, and an EP called Red Gold. In 2007, Drag City released Sighs Trapped by Liars, another collaboration of Red Krayola with Art & Language, followed in 2010 with another, Five American Portraits, which consists of musical portraits of Wile E. Coyote, President George W Bush, President Jimmy Carter, John Wayne, and Ad Reinhardt, with vocals by Gina Birch.

In 2012, Red Krayola performed with the Familiar Ugly at the Whitney Biennial via Skype with band members talking live daily with visitors. While not online, loops of archival concert footage were displayed on screen.

In 2014, Thompson and Art & Language began work on "Born in Flames II", the follow-up to their 1983 Red Crayola single "Born in Flames". In 2016, Drag City released the album Baby and Child Care, originally recorded in 1984 as a follow up to Black Snakes.

In 2025, the Red Krayola announced their first live performance in over a decade at the Hollywood Palladium in Los Angeles, supporting Cap'n Jazz on November, 21. The band featured a new lineup: Tom Watson on guitar, Bill Bowman on bass, Connor Gallaher on pedal steel, and Raul Morales on drums.

== Legacy and influences ==
Mayo Thompson originally drew inspiration from avant-garde composers John Cage, Harry Partch, Francis Poulenc, David Tudor, Morton Feldman and Karlheinz Stockhausen as well as free jazz musicians John Coltrane, Ornette Coleman and Albert Ayler. The British Invasion became a key influence with acts like the Beatles, the Rolling Stones, the Kinks, the Animals, Them and the Yardbirds. Other influences included American musicians Lightnin' Hopkins, Wilson Pickett, the Midnighters, the Byrds, Love, Bob Dylan, the Fugs, Van Dyke Parks, John Fahey and Frank Zappa.

Later incarnations of the band infused the influence of members from groups such as Art & Language, Pere Ubu, Essential Logic and the Raincoats, and later Jim O'Rourke and David Grubbs of Gastr del Sol, Tom Watson of Slovenly and John McEntire of Tortoise.

Pitchfork labelled Red Krayola "likely the most experimental band of the 1960s". They have influenced a number of notable artists such as Joseph Byrd, Zachary Cole Smith of DIIV, David Berman, Nick Cave and the Birthday Party, Animal Collective, Bobby Gillespie of Primal Scream, Ty Segall, MGMT, Osees, Cardiacs, Stephin Merritt, Jack Ruby, Yo La Tengo, Mike Watt of Minutemen and Firehose, Ariel Pink, Gastr Del Sol, the Black Angels, Cabaret Voltaire, Spacemen 3, the Missingmen, and Melody's Echo Chamber.

Alien Sex Fiend, Really Red, Dwarves, Nik Turner (Inner City Unit), the Soup Dragons, Barkmarket, the Pastels, Sort Sol, the Missingmen, Galaxie 500, Spacemen 3, and the Cramps covered their songs.

== Discography ==
=== Studio albums ===
- The Parable of Arable Land (1967)
- God Bless the Red Krayola and All Who Sail With It (1968)
- Soldier-Talk (1979)
- Three Songs on a Trip to the United States (1983)
- Malefactor, Ade (1989)
- The Red Krayola (1994)
- Coconut Hotel (1995, recorded 1967)
- Hazel (1996)
- Fingerpainting (1999)
- Introduction (2006)

=== with Art & Language ===
- Corrected Slogans (1976)
- Kangaroo? (1981)
- Black Snakes (1983)
- Sighs Trapped by Liars (2007)
- Five American Portraits (2010)
- Baby and Child Care (2016, recorded 1984)

=== Compilation and remix albums ===
- Deliverance (1996)
- Singles (2004)
- Hurricane Fighter Plane (2006)
- Fingerpointing (2008)

=== Live albums ===
- Live 1967 (1998)
- Live in Paris 13/12/1978 (1998)

=== Soundtracks ===
- Japan in Paris in L.A. (2004)

=== Extended plays ===
- Amor and Language (1995)
- Blues, Hollers and Hellos (2000)
- Red Gold (2006)

=== Singles ===
- "Hurricane Fighter Plane / Reverberation" (1978)
- "Wives in Orbit / Yik-Yak" (1978)
- "Micro-Chips and Fish" (1979)
- "Born in Flames / The Sword of God" (1980)
- "An Old Man's Dream / The Milkmaid" (1981)
- "Rattenmensch: Gewichtswächter / Zukunftsflieger" (1981)
- "The Red Crayola on Forty-Five" (1993)
- "4Teen / Stink Program" (1994)
- "Chemistry / Farewell to Arms" (1996)
- "Father Abraham" (1998)
- "Come On Down" (1999)
- "Stil de Grain Brun" (2002)
- "Greasy Street" (2010)
