= Red Gold (EP) =

EP by The Red Krayola
- Released: November 14, 2006
- Recorded: August, 2005 at Soma E.M.S., Chicago, Illinois
- Genre: Experimental rock
- Length: 21:06
- Label: Drag City
- Producer: Drag City

The Red Krayola chronology
Introduction (2006)	Red Gold (2006)	Sighs Trapped by Liars (2007)

Professional ratings
Review scores
Source	Rating
AllMusic	3.5/5 stars
Tiny Mix Tapes	2.5/5 stars

Red Gold is an EP by the experimental rock band Red Krayola, released in 2006 by Drag City.

== Critical reception ==
Perfect Sound Forever called the album "a hoot," writing that "it's as accessible as any RK record, which is to say, the music's incredibly catchy once you've listened to it five times." Tiny Mix Tapes called it "a curiosity that, while highly uneven, is worth seeking out if for no other reason than its sheer eccentricity."

== Track listing ==
All lyrics are written by Mayo Thompson; all music is composed by The Red Krayola.

No.	Title	Length
1.	"Paris"	4:56
2.	"Oh I Was Bad"	2:59
3.	"Easy Street"	4:14
4.	"The Essence of Life"	2:57
5.	"The Well"	4:04
6.	"Bong Bong"	1:56

== Personnel ==
Red Krayola

- John McEntire – drums, synthesizer, ukulele, mixing, recording
- Stephen Prina – guitar, harpsichord, piano, organ, tambourine, vocals
- Mayo Thompson – vocals, guitar
- Tom Watson – bass guitar, guitar, harpsichord, synthesizer, vocals

Additional musicians and production

- Charlie Abel – accordion
- Drag City – production
- Noel Kupersmith – bass guitar, photography
- Roger Seibel – mastering
