= Sighs Trapped by Liars =

Studio album by the Red Krayola with Art & Language
- Released: September 17, 2007
- Genre: Experimental rock
- Length: 51:47
- Label: Drag City

The Red Krayola with Art & Language chronology
Black Snakes (1983)	Sighs Trapped by Liars (2007)	Five American Portraits (2010)

The Red Krayola chronology
Red Gold (2006)	Sighs Trapped by Liars (2007)	Fingerpointing (2008)

Professional ratings
Review scores
Source	Rating
AllMusic	4.5/5 stars
Pitchfork Media	6.8/10
Uncut	4/5 stars

Sighs Trapped by Liars is the fourth collaboration between the experimental rock band Red Krayola and the conceptual art group Art & Language, released on September 17, 2007, by Drag City.

== Critical reception ==
The Times gave the album a mixed review, writing that the "Krayola back two hesitant and foul-mouthed chanteuses singing uncharacteristically pretty yet typically unfocused tunes."

== Track listing ==
All lyrics are written by Art & Language; all music is composed by the Red Krayola.

No.	Title	Length
1.	"Fairest of All"	2:52
2.	"Jumping Through the Mirror"	4:42
3.	"Laughing at the Foot of the Cross"	4:15
4.	"Il Ne Reste Qu'a Chanter"	4:34
5.	"Hostage"	3:00
6.	"Jerry Fodor's Story"	2:50
7.	"The Big Vacation"	3:47
8.	"Four Stars: The Ideal Crew"	8:13
9.	"Igor Zabel's Song"	3:53
10.	"A Pest"	3:24
11.	"Perfection"	2:16
12.	"Forty Thousand Words on a Chair"	3:20
13.	"Sighs Trapped by Liars"	4:41

== Personnel ==
Red Krayola

- John McEntire – drums, recording
- Jim O'Rourke – acoustic guitar, harmonica, synthesizer, backing vocals, mixing, recording
- Mayo Thompson – acoustic guitar, piano
- Tom Watson – electric guitar, bass

Additional musicians and production

- Art & Language – illustration, photography
- Scott Benzel – recording
- Noel Kupersmith – bass guitar
- Dan Osborn – design
- Arthur Ou – photography
- Elisa Randazzo – vocals, recording
- Roger Seibel – mastering
- Sandy Yang – vocals
