= Kangaroo? =

Studio album by the Red Crayola with Art & Language
- Released: 1981
- Studio: Studio 80, London, England
- Genres: Art rock; post-punk; avant-jazz
- Length: 39:37
- Labels: Rough Trade (original release); Drag City (reissue)
- Producers: Adam Kidron; Epic Soundtracks; Lora Logic; Mayo Thompson

The Red Crayola with Art & Language chronology
Corrected Slogans (1976)	Kangaroo? (1981)	Black Snakes (1983)

The Red Crayola chronology
Soldier-Talk (1979)	Kangaroo? (1981)	Black Snakes (1983)

Singles from Kangaroo?
- 1. "An Old Man's Dream / The Milkmaid" Released: 1981

Kangaroo? is the second collaboration between the experimental rock band the Red Crayola and the conceptual art group Art & Language, released in 1981 by Rough Trade Records. The album was reissued on CD by Drag City in 1995.

== Reception ==
Professional ratings
Review scores
Source	Rating
AllMusic	3/5 stars
Robert Christgau	A−
The Encyclopedia of Popular Music	2/5 stars
Spin Alternative Record Guide	7/10

The Rough Guide to Rock wrote that the album contained "quirky, ramshackle songs." The Spin Alternative Record Guide called it "interesting, but ... sort of brittle and too intellectual for its own good."

Charles Hayward of This Heat stated, "But when they did Kangaroo? I just couldn’t get into it. Red Crayola went off into this thing of polemic with musical accompaniment. That's the way with stylistic movements such as punk, by the end they tend to cut off one part of your body and over-emphasise one other part. That's what happened to punk when it became post-punk."

== Track listing ==
All tracks are written by Art & Language and Mayo Thompson.

Side one
No.	Title	Length
1.	"Kangaroo?"	1:35
2.	"Portrait of V. I. Lenin in the Style of Jackson Pollock, Part I"	2:55
3.	"Portrait of V. I. Lenin in the Style of Jackson Pollock, Part II"	4:47
4.	"Marches No's 23, 24, 25"	2:28
5.	"Born to Win (Transactional Analysis with Gestalt Experiments)"	1:21
6.	"Keep All Your Friends"	2:11
7.	"The Milkmaid"	1:57
8.	"The Principles of Party Organisation"	2:38

Side two
No.	Title	Length
1.	"Prisoner's Model"	1:56
2.	"The Mistake of Trotsky"	3:14
3.	"1917"	1:15
4.	"The Tractor Driver"	2:36
5.	"Plekhanov"	3:13
6.	"An Old Man's Dream"	2:27
7.	"If She Loves You"	4:29

== Personnel ==
Musicians

- Ben Annesley – instruments
- Epic Soundtracks – instruments, production
- Gina Birch – instruments
- Lora Logic – instruments, production
- Allen Ravenstine – instruments
- Mayo Thompson – instruments, production

Production

- Adam Kidron – production
- Tim Thompson – engineering, mixing
