= Five American Portraits =

Studio album by The Red Krayola with Art & Language
- Released: January 26, 2010
- Genre: Experimental rock
- Length: 44:12
- Label: Drag City

The Red Krayola with Art & Language chronology
Sighs Trapped by Liars (2007)	Five American Portraits (2010)

The Red Krayola chronology
Fingerpointing (2008)	Five American Portraits (2010)

Professional ratings
Aggregate scores
Source	Rating
Metacritic	(71/100)
Review scores
Source	Rating
AllMusic	4/5 stars
Robert Christgau	(1-star Honorable Mention)
Pitchfork Media	(6.2/10)
PopMatters	8/10 stars
Uncut	3/5 stars

Five American Portraits is an album by the experimental rock band Red Krayola and the conceptual art group Art & Language, released in 2010 by Drag City.

== Critical reception ==
The Philadelphia Inquirer wrote that "forty-four years after its start, the Red Krayola is still as ridiculous as it is compelling."

== Track listing ==
All lyrics are written by Art & Language; all music is composed by The Red Krayola

No.	Title	Length
1.	"Portrait of Wile E. Coyote"	5:03
2.	"Portrait of President George W. Bush"	12:16
3.	"Portrait of President Jimmy Carter"	5:59
4.	"Portrait of John Wayne"	15:05
5.	"Portrait of Ad Reinhardt"	5:49

== Personnel ==
Red Krayola

- Gina Birch – bass guitar, vocals
- Alex Dower – drums, percussion, backing vocals
- Jim O'Rourke – bass guitar
- Tom Rogerson – piano
- Mayo Thompson – guitar, piano, vocals, mixing
- Tom Watson – guitar

Additional musicians and production

- Dan Cox – backing vocals, engineering
- Butchy Fuego – mixing
- Matt Ingram – backing vocals, engineering
- Rian Murphy – mixing
- Fred Somsen – backing vocals
