= Live 1967 =

Live 1967 may refer to:

- Live 1967 (The Monkees album)
- Live 1967 (Red Krayola album)
