= Black Snakes =

Studio album by Red Krayola with Art & Language
- Released: 1983
- Recorded: Sunrise, Switzerland
- Genre: Experimental rock
- Length: 47:22
- Labels: RecRec (original release); Drag City (reissue)

Red Krayola with Art & Language chronology
Kangaroo? (1981)	Black Snakes (1983)	Sighs Trapped by Liars (2007)

The Red Krayola chronology
Kangaroo? (1981)	Black Snakes (1983)	Three Songs on a Trip to the United States (1983)

Black Snakes is a collaboration between the experimental rock band Red Krayola and the conceptual art group Art & Language. It was released in 1983 by RecRec Music. The album was reissued by Drag City in 1997.

== Critical reception ==
Professional ratings
Review scores
Source	Rating
Robert Christgau	B
The Encyclopedia of Popular Music	3/5 stars
Spin Alternative Record Guide	6/10

Dave Thompson, in Alternative Rock, referred to the album as an "avant-garde theater [soundtrack] without the theater to explain what was happening."

== Track listing ==
All tracks are written by Michael Baldwin, Mel Ramsden, and Mayo Thompson.

Side one
No.	Title	Length
1.	"Black Snakes"	4:41
2.	"Ratman, The Weightwatcher"	2:52
3.	"The Sloths"	6:42
4.	"The Jam"	4:29
5.	"Hedges"	3:48

Side two
No.	Title	Length
1.	"Portrait of V. I. Lenin in the Style of Jackson Pollock, Part I"	3:05
2.	"Future Pilots"	4:17
3.	"A Portrait of You"	4:49
4.	"Words of Love"	4:49
5.	"Café Twenty-One"	3:53
6.	"Gynaecology in Ancient Greece"	3:55

== Personnel ==
Musicians

- Ben Annesley – bass guitar
- Chris Taylor – drums
- Allen Ravenstine – synthesizer, saxophone
- Mayo Thompson – guitar, vocals

Production

- Etienne Conod – recording
- Eric Radcliffe – mixing
- Robert Vogel – recording
