= Corrected Slogans =

Studio album by Art & Language with the Red Krayola
- Released: 1976
- Studios: Acorn Records Ltd., Oxford, England, and Basement/Big Apple, New York City
- Genre: Alternative rock
- Length: 46:34
- Labels: Music-Language (original release); Drag City (reissue)
- Producers: Art & Language, the Red Krayola

Art & Language with the Red Krayola chronology
Corrected Slogans (1976)	Kangaroo? (1981)

The Red Krayola chronology
God Bless the Red Krayola and All Who Sail With It (1968)	Corrected Slogans (1976)	Soldier-Talk (1979)

Corrected Slogans is a studio album collaboration between the American band Red Krayola and the English group Art & Language. It was released in 1976 by the publisher Music-Language. The album reissued by Drag City in 1997.

== Critical reception ==
Professional ratings
Review scores
Source	Rating
AllMusic	3/5 stars
Spin Alternative Record Guide	7/10

Magnet called Correct Slogans "a mostly acoustic album of strange, politically charged pieces that sometimes border on opera." The Dallas Observer wrote that the album matches "skeletal backing by Thompson and 16-year-old drummer Jesse Chamberlain ... with Art & Language's dry, unsingerly voices and their intentionally antilyrical lumps of Marxist art theory."

== Track listing ==
All tracks are written by Michael Baldwin, Philip Pilkington, and Mayo Thompson.

Side one
No.	Title	Length
1.	"Maharashtra"	1:35
2.	"Keep All Your Friends"	2:20
3.	"Imagination I & II"	1:11
4.	"Coleridge vs Martineau"	1:26
5.	"An Exemplification"	1:08
6.	"Postscript to SDS' Infiltration"	0:25
7.	"War Dance I & II"	3:30
8.	"An Harangue"	3:05
9.	"Ergastulum"	3:01
10.	"The Mistakes of Trotsky... Thesmophoriazusae"	2:09
11.	"Louis Napoleon"	2:33

Side two
No.	Title	Length
1.	"Seven Compartments"	2:42
2.	"Petrichenko"	2:47
3.	"Don't Talk to Sociologists..."	2:14
4.	"What Are the Inexpensive Things the Panel Most Enjoys? ... An International"	1:01
5.	"History"	3:55
6.	"It's an Illusion"	1:43
7.	"Penny Capitalists"	2:31
8.	"Plekhanov"	3:08
9.	"Natura Facit Saltus"	1:20

== Personnel ==
- Art & Language – production, mixing
- Jesse Chamberlain – drums
- Colin Bateman – engineering, mixing, recording
- Thomas Duffy – engineering, mixing, recording
- Doug Pomeroy – engineering, recording
- The Red Crayola – production
- Stewart Romain – mastering
- Wieslaw Woszczyk – engineering, mixing
