= Three Songs on a Trip to the United States =

Studio album / Live album by Red Krayola
- Released: 1983
- Recorded: August 28, 1983, in Cologne (live)
- Studios: Conny's, Trident
- Genres: Alternative rock, psychedelic rock
- Length: 29:22
- Labels: Pure Freude (original release); Drag City (reissue)
- Producer: Jon Caffery

Red Krayola chronology
| Black Snakes (1983) | Three Songs on a Trip to the United States (1983) | Malefactor, Ade (1989) |

Three Songs on a Trip to the United States is the fourth album by the American band Red Krayola, released in 1983 by Pure Freude. The album was adopted by Drag City and re-issued on CD in 1997. The album cover photos were provided by previous member Frederick Barthelme.

== Critical reception ==
Professional ratings
Review scores
| Source | Rating |
|---|---|
| The Encyclopedia of Popular Music | 2/5 stars |
| Spin Alternative Record Guide | 8/10 |

Alternative Rock singled out the album, writing: "Essentially an EP, the set peaks across its second side and a hefty live slab of stripped-down psychedelics." Rock: The Rough Guide called it "highly recommended."

== Track listing ==
Side one
| No. | Title | Length |
|---|---|---|
| 1. | "Monster One" | 3:02 |
| 2. | "California Girl" | 6:18 |
| 3. | "Caribbean Postcard" | 3:42 |

Side two
| No. | Title | Length |
|---|---|---|
| 1. | "Discipline" | 2:33 |
| 2. | "X" | 2:43 |
| 3. | "Wives in Orbit" | 3:01 |
| 4. | "Ergastulum" | 3:11 |
| 5. | "Portrait of You" | 4:52 |

== Personnel ==
Red Krayola

- Jesse Chamberlain – drums
- Allen Ravenstine – keyboards
- Mayo Thompson – guitar, vocals

Additional musicians and production

- Jon Caffery – production, mixing
