= Live 1967 (Red Krayola album) =

Live album by Red Krayola
- Released: July 28, 1998
- Recorded: June–July 1967
- Venues: Berkeley Folk Festival, Berkeley, California
- Studios: Venice Beach, Los Angeles
- Genre: Experimental rock
- Length: 108:41
- Label: Drag City
- Producers: Kurt Von Meier, Red Krayola

Red Krayola chronology
Hazel (1996)	Live 1967 (1998)	Fingerpainting (1999)

Live 1967 is a live performance album by the experimental rock band Red Krayola. It was released in 1998 by Drag City. The two-disc set comprises the band's performance at the Angry Arts Festival in Los Angeles as well as their sets from various shows at the Berkeley Folk Festival during summer 1967. Like all the music played at the festivals, it is dedicated to the troops positioned in Vietnam.

== Background ==
Kurt Von Meier, a University of California art-history professor, became interested in the band after he heard tapes containing Coconut Hotel, Red Krayola's rejected second album. He was intrigued by the band's experimental and free-form music and invited them to perform at Angry Arts Folk Festival in Berkeley and the Greek Theatre in Los Angeles in June and July. Meier also pushed to get the band to play in the Monterey Pop Festival, but was turned down by the festival's organizers.

== Performance ==
The music played by the Red Crayola during their sets was completely instrumental and consisted of drone, noise music and free improvisation, comparable to early Velvet Underground. The first disc contains the band's performance at the Angry Arts Festival on June 6, 1967. The second disc is made up of three separate performances which took place in the evenings between June 27 to July 4. During the festival, the band met the folk guitarist John Fahey, who accompanied the band onstage for an improvisation session. On the 4th, the announcer mistook the Red Krayola's music for an equipment malfunction and continued to talk several minutes into the band's set.

== Reception ==
Professional ratings
Review scores
Source	Rating
AllMusic	2/5 stars
The Encyclopedia of Popular Music	2/5 stars

These performances received a lukewarm response from audience and critics alike. Berkeley's underground newspaper, the Berkeley Barb, dismissed the band as being the "bummer of the festival." Some of audience accused the music of being so abrasive that it was the direct cause of a dog's death during the festival.

In reviewing the two-disc release, the music critic Richie Unterberger noted his admiration of the band's dedication to experimenting in-front of an audience who expected more conventional music. He gave the album two out of five stars, writing, "The Velvet Underground and Pink Floyd, however, rarely stuck with this kind of inaccessible freakiness for more than a few minutes at a time on record, even at their most willfully obscure. This is all inaccessible freakiness."

== Covers ==
On October 24, 2019, Lisson Gallery New York hosted a night of performance, discussion and music inspired by the pioneering work of Art & Language and their 40-year collaboration with the Red Krayola, at the event J. Spaceman and John Coxon covered the entirety of Live 1967 and released as J. Spaceman, John Coxon – Play The Red Krayola Live 1967 in 2021.

== Track listing ==
All music is composed by Red Krayola.

Disc one
No.	Title	Length
1.	"Venice Pavilion Concert, Afternoon"	27:03
2.	"Venice Motel, Evening: Piece One"	12:35
3.	"Venice Motel, Evening: Piece Two"	4:16

Disc two
No.	Title	Length
1.	"7/2, Evening: "Dust""	27:46
2.	"7/3, Afternoon: Red Crayola with John Fahey"	22:53
3.	"7/4, Afternoon: Jubilee Concert at Hearst Greek Theatre Radio Broadcast on KQED/San Francisco"	14:08

== Personnel ==
Red Krayola

- Rick Barthelme – drums
- Steve Cunningham – bass guitar
- Mayo Thompson – guitar, vocals

Additional musicians and production

- John Fahey – guitar
- Kurt Von Meier – production
- Red Krayola – production
