= Blues, Hollers and Hellos =

EP by The Red Krayola
- Released: September 19, 2000
- Genre: Experimental rock
- Length: 41:19
- Label: Drag City

The Red Krayola chronology
Fingerpainting (1999)	Blues, Hollers and Hellos (2000)	Singles (2004)

Professional ratings
Review scores
Source	Rating
AllMusic	2.5/5 stars

Blues, Hollers and Hellos is an EP by the experimental rock band Red Krayola. It was released in 2000 by Drag City.

== Critical reception ==
The Chicago Reader wrote that "the band deliberately deprives the songs of resolution with out-of-tempo drumming and anticlimactic noodling, and doesn't offer anything to make up for the loss."

== Track listing ==
No.	Title	Length
1.	"Container of Drudgery (Never Had a Name)"	16:47
2.	"Magnificence as Such"	9:10
3.	"Is There?"	3:53
4.	"6-5-3 Blues" (I)	4:11
5.	"6-5-3 Blues" (II)	1:31
6.	"6-5-3 Blues" (III)	5:33
