= Corky's Debt to His Father =

Studio album by Mayo Thompson
- Released: 1970
- Recorded: February 1970
- Studios: Andrus, Houston, Texas
- Genres: Singer-songwriter; folk rock
- Length: 37:56
- Label: Texas Revolution
- Producers: Mayo Thompson, Frank Davis, Roger Romano

Corky's Debt to His Father is the debut solo studio album by Mayo Thompson, the leader of the Red Krayola, released in 1970 by Texas Revolution. At the time, the album was recorded at Walt Andrus' studio and set to release on his independent label Texas Revolution. However, due to the executives hating the record, it was given no official release, with only a few hundred copies pressed and sold via mail order.

"Horses" would later be re-recorded by Thompson when he joined Pere Ubu on The Art of Walking (1980). The album would be reissued for the first time in 1985 on the English label Glass Records. It was later reissued again in 1994, on vinyl and CD, through Drag City.

In 2013, Thompson formed the Corky Band and performed the entirety of Corky's Debt to His Father for the first time at the Cropped Out music festival in Louisville, Kentucky, and later at California's Hammer Museum in 2020.

== Background ==
After the Red Krayola disbanded in 1968, Mayo Thompson returned to Walt Andrus' Studio with various Nashville session musicians to record a solo album. Corky's Debt to His Father was recorded and released in 1970 on independent record label Texas Revolution. At the time, promotional posters were distributed for the album in Rolling Stone in 1971 and later the Texas zine Not Fade Away in 1977.

The cover image is an illustration by John Charles Dollman for an article in the British newspaper The Graphic published September 10, 1892. The album's title was inspired by a cat named Corky which laid "cigar" shaped turds. The phrase "Corky's Cigar" would be displayed on the side of the record sleeve. In an interview, Thompson remarked about the plans they had before the demise of the Texas Revolution label: "We were going to make records of the news. We were going to put the newspaper to music, and sell it on street corners. Like make it in one day, press it, and sell it the next week. Topical songs, sold out of the back of a truck. All the things that we've later come to see—indie music, the DIY scene, all that stuff."

== Critical reception ==
Professional ratings
Review scores
Source	Rating
AllMusic	4.5/5 stars
Spin Alternative Record Guide	8/10

Corky's Debt to His Father was recorded in 1970 and released on Texas Revolution; however, due to the executives "hating" the record, it was given no official release, with only a few hundred copies pressed and sold via mail order, with the label folding shortly after.

In 1994, The Chicago Reader wrote that "the music has an easy, folksy feel, the crack band laying down a down-home ambience that's unkempt in a precise way." The New Yorker called Corky's Debt to His Father "an emblematic cult record, twisting the ears of a fervent few." Trouser Press deemed it "a left-field version of a blues and neo-vaudeville album [that is] played mostly acoustic on slide guitar, piano, bass and elementary traps, with some horns and electricity."

LA Weekly called it "an overlooked collection of cracked and arty folk songs that set the template for lo-fi, indie-pop styles decades later." In a retrospective review, Richie Unterberger assessed the record as being "more palatable to pop ears than any of Thompson's numerous Red Krayola records" as well as appraising it as "an eclectic folk-rock base that bore some rough similarities to Syd Barrett's work".

== Legacy ==
In 2013, Thompson formed the Corky Band and performed the entirety of Corky's Debt to His Father for the first time at the Cropped Out music festival in Louisville, Kentucky, and later at California's Hammer Museum in 2020.

Jeff Mangum of Neutral Milk Hotel has been cited as a huge fan of the record. In 2019, he attended Thompson's live performance of Corky's Debt to His Father at (Le) Poisson Rouge.

Andrew VanWyngarden of MGMT mentioned in a 2011 interview with NME that he used to listen to Corky's Debt to His Father more than The Parable of Arable Land.

== Covers ==
Pere Ubu covered "Horses" in 1980. Lower Dens covered "Dear Betty Baby" in 2011. Dean Wareham covered "Dear Betty Baby" in 2025.

== Track listing ==
All tracks are written by Mayo Thompson, except where noted. "Woof" is an instrumental outtake from the sessions, released in 2004 on the Red Krayola's Singles compilation and later the 2008 Drag City reissue of Corky's Debt to His Father.

Side 1
No.	Title	Length
1.	"The Lesson"	2:39
2.	"Oyster Thins"	6:00
3.	"Horses"	3:09
4.	"Dear Betty Baby"	3:47
5.	"Venus in the Morning"	2:30

Side 2
No.	Title	Writer(s)	Length
1.	"To You"		2:50
2.	"Fortune"		2:11
3.	"Black Legs"	Thompson; Rick Barthelme	3:50
4.	"Good Brisk Blues"		3:07
5.	"Around the Home"		2:50
6.	"Worried Worried"		5:03
Total length:			37:56

2008 Drag City reissue bonus tracks
No.	Title	Writer(s)	Length
1.	"Woof"		5:04
2.	"4'33"	John Cage, Sergei McUgly	4:33
Total length:			47:33

== Personnel ==
- Mayo Thompson – vocals, guitar, bass, production
- Frank Davis – production, engineering, fiddle guitar, timpani
- Roger Romano – production, engineering, percussion
- Joe Duggan – piano
- Mike Sumler – slide guitar, bass, tenor saxophone
- LeAnne Romano – baritone horn
- Chuck Conway – drums, bongos, percussion
- Jimi Newhouse – drums
- Carson Graham – drums
- The La La's – backing vocals
- The Whoaback Singers – backing vocals
