= Elisa Randazzo =

Elisa Rose Randazzo
- Origin: Nyack, New York, US
- Genres: Folk
- Years active: 1996 – Current
- Members: Elisa Randazzo

Elisa Randazzo is an American musician, songwriter and fashion designer who is based in California. Although her contributions as a songwriter, singer and violinist have spanned many musical projects, Bruises and Butterflies is her first solo release. It debuted on the Drag City label on May 18, 2010. Two songs on this LP are a result of her collaboration with the influential, 1970s British folk singer/guitarist, Bridget St John. Randazzo is known for layered harmonies and string arrangements.

Elisa was born in New York to well-known songwriters, Victoria Pike and Teddy Randazzo. Her father wrote hit pop songs such as, "Goin' Out of My Head,” "It's Gonna Take a Miracle," and "Hurt So Bad," which were recorded by a gamut of early pop legends, from Little Anthony and the Imperials, to The Zombies to Linda Ronstadt to Frank Sinatra, among others. Her mother was also a prolific songwriter, writing psychedelic classics such as The Third Bardo's "I'm Five Years Ahead of My Time,” and “Rain In My Heart” by Frank Sinatra (together with Teddy Randazzo). Elisa grew up in Nyack, NY, but spent a lot of time on the road with her parents. She spent nursery school in Jamaica, where her father developed bands in a Kingston studio, as well as numerous stints in Las Vegas while her parents performed in lounges across from Elvis, among others.

Elisa received a rigorous liberal arts education at the Green Meadow Waldorf School in the New York suburb of Spring Valley. The Steiner curriculum introduced her to the violin at the age of eight. After graduating Green Meadow, Randazzo studied political science in Paris, France and then at New York's Columbia University. After moving to Los Angeles, she met musician-artist Mayo Thompson, best known for his leadership of the avant-garde rock band, Red Krayola. She played violin and sang with Red Krayola, touring the United States, Japan and Austria. She also appears on four Red Krayola LPs (Drag City), including, 'Sighs Trapped By Liars,' which was recorded in 2007. She has also guest appeared on many projects as a vocalists and/or violinist.

== Appears on ==
- First Tell Me Your Name (7", EP) Tugboat 3001-ad Little Mafia Records 1996
- Hazel (LP) Red Krayola Drag City 1996
- The Fakers & The Takers (7") Further Fierce Panda 1997
- Fingerpainting (Album) ◄ (2 versions) Red Krayola Drag City 1999
- Fingerpainting (LP) Red Krayola Drag City 1999
- Fingerpainting (CD, Album) Red Krayola Drag City 1999
- Don't Let the Bastards Get You Down: A Tribute to Kris Kristofferson Jackpine Social Club (CD) 2002
- I Believe in the Spirit (CD single) Tim Burgess P.I.A.S. 2003
- Fairechild (CD) Fairechild Spaceshed Records 2005
- Sighs Trapped By Liars (CD, Album) Red Krayola Drag City 2007
- Fingerpointing (CD, Album) Red Krayola Drag City 2008,
- Pacific Dust (CD, Album) The Mother Hips Camera Records 2009
- Bruises & Butterflies (CD, Album) Elisa Randazzo Drag City 2010
- Doris & the Daggers (CD, Album) Spiral Stairs [[Nine Mile,[3] Domino (record label)]] 2017
