= Fingerpainting (album) =

Studio album by Red Krayola
- Released: June 8, 1999
- Genre: Experimental rock
- Length: 44:46
- Label: Drag City

Red Krayola chronology
Live 1967 (1998)	Fingerpainting (1999)	Blues, Hollers and Hellos (2000)

Fingerpainting is an album by the experimental rock band Red Krayola, released in 1999 by Drag City. The album contains songs that were originally worked on by the 1960s line-up of the band.

== Critical reception ==
Professional ratings
Review scores
Source	Rating
AllMusic	2.5/5 stars
Alternative Press	4/5 stars
The Encyclopedia of Popular Music	2/5 stars
Pitchfork Media	3.7/10
PopMatters	5/10 stars
The Stranger	3/4 stars

The Dallas Observer wrote: "It's a challenging piece of work, but a rewarding one: Once you get past their peculiar handling, the songs are among the most accessible the band has released, and after a few plays, even the most difficult sections reveal a wealth of structure and detail." The Stranger wrote that "for the uninitiated, it'll leave you completely befuddled." CMJ New Music Report called the album "a long, strange, headphone trip worth taking."

== Track listing ==
No.	Title	Length
1.	"George III"	1:50
2.	"Bad Medicine"	3:30
3.	"A Hybrid Creature of Greed, Ignorance and Powers of Comprehension Plays a Vaulted Drum Kit. The Playing Corresponds Completely to the Event. There Are Entrances and Exits. And There Is Gravitation, Where It Is Needed – Tears for Example"	2:22
4.	"There There Betty Betty"	2:29
5.	"The Greed of a Clarinet That Is Puffy from Crying Gets Tossed in Butter and Spread by Notes. This Process Depresses the Entire Orchestra So Much That It Only Plays Behind a Golden Partition. The Partition Is Decorated with Semi-Precious Attractive Diamonds"	4:41
6.	"Vile Vile Grass"	2:31
7.	"A Sow with an Abbess's Bonnet Is Sitting on Four Rock-Objects and Singing Along with Them. The Song Sounds Like a Cheater, And Is Imprisoned in a Striped Toy Box Because Its Aims Are Not Recognizable. On Top of the Box Is a Head That Could Be Elvis's, If He Had Survived This"	5:48
8.	"Mother"	2:16
9.	"Out of a Trombone That Is Divided Lengthways by a Partition of Gold Sound Seven Violins of Dynamite That Are Cut Sideways into Thin Slices. They Are Played by the Thrown Out Ex-Members of a Very Bad Band and Blown Up"	4:17
10.	"In My Baby's Ruth, Sandy's Drums with David & Shadwell, Filthy Lucre"	15:02

== Personnel ==
- Frederick Barthelme
- Steve Cunningham
- David Grubbs
- Bobby Henschen
- George Hurley
- Albert Oehlen
- Stephen Prina
- Elisa Randazzo
- Mayo Thompson
- Tom Watson
- Christopher Williams
- Sandy Yang
