= Coconut Hotel =

Studio album by Red Krayola
- Released: March 25, 1995
- Recorded: 1967
- Studios: Andrus, Houston
- Genre: Avant-garde
- Length: 33:22
- Label: Drag City
- Producer: Red Krayola

Red Krayola chronology
The Red Krayola (1994)	Coconut Hotel (1995)	Amor and Language (1995)

Coconut Hotel is an album originally recorded in 1967 by the American avant rock band Red Krayola. The intent was for it to be the band's second album after the release of The Parable of Arable Land, but it was rejected and shelved indefinitely by International Artists. Coconut Hotel would not hit stores till 1995 when it was finally issued by Drag City.

== Background ==
In an interview with Ritchie Unterberger, Mayo Thompson said:

"The first record did business. IA called me and said, let's have a second album, we need another album. We recorded a second album, Coconut Hotel, which the label didn't like at all, which was this abstract music, the most extreme version of the logic that we could conceive of at that time, and also answered to our needs. I mean, if people are going to claim that they're making innovations, we felt anybody who makes these claims had better make them in light of what's going on in jazz, and what's going on in R&B, and places where music is—there's certain kinds of things where experimentation within forms, within closures, are going on."

== Recording ==
For Coconut Hotel, Mayo Thompson, Steve Cunningham and Frederick Barthelme returned to Andrus studio in Houston.

Thompson commented on the recording process: "It was done in a slightly more leisurely way, but we recorded all live in stereo, a pair of matched condenser microphones... There's no plan... The development of it is not in the usual musical way—there's not a melodic development, there's not a rhythmic development, there's not an intensifying of the dynamic strategy or anything."

== Music ==
The album contains 36 one second pieces, the second track "Water Pour" consists of a two-minute piece that is played twice, Thompson said this was in reference to a performance habit of Mozart.

Steve Cunningham elaborated on how Coconut Hotel was a natural progression from The Parable of Arable Land in the 2nd issue of Mother: Houston's Rock Magazine (1968): "It is definitely a natural progression. We feel that we are now doing the right thing, having in the past done likewise."

== Reception ==
Professional ratings
Review scores
Source	Rating
AllMusic	2/5 stars
The Encyclopedia of Popular Music	2/5 stars

Richie Unterberger of AllMusic wrote: "This has so little commercial potential that it makes Zappa's Lumpy Gravy sound like AM radio fodder" also adding, "It's totally uncompromising, and rather wearisome, to be honest. It's like nothing else that nominally 'rock' groups were doing in 1967."

== Track listing ==
All tracks are written by Steve Cunningham and Mayo Thompson.

No.	Title	Length
1.	"Boards"	6:28
2.	"Water Pour"	4:40
3.	"One-Second Piece"	0:04
4.	"One-Second Piece"	0:06
5.	"One-Second Piece"	0:04
6.	"One-Second Piece"	0:04
7.	"One-Second Piece"	0:04
8.	"One-Second Piece"	0:07
9.	"One-Second Piece"	0:08
10.	"One-Second Piece"	0:05
11.	"One-Second Piece"	0:05
12.	"One-Second Piece"	0:05
13.	"One-Second Piece"	0:07
14.	"One-Second Piece"	0:04
15.	"One-Second Piece"	0:11
16.	"One-Second Piece"	0:04
17.	"One-Second Piece"	0:04
18.	"One-Second Piece"	0:11
19.	"One-Second Piece"	0:04
20.	"One-Second Piece"	0:04
21.	"One-Second Piece"	0:06
22.	"One-Second Piece"	0:04
23.	"One-Second Piece"	0:05
24.	"One-Second Piece"	0:04
25.	"One-Second Piece"	0:04
26.	"One-Second Piece"	0:04
27.	"One-Second Piece"	0:04
28.	"One-Second Piece"	0:04
29.	"One-Second Piece"	0:07
30.	"One-Second Piece"	0:05
31.	"One-Second Piece"	0:04
32.	"One-Second Piece"	0:04
33.	"One-Second Piece"	0:06
34.	"One-Second Piece"	0:04
35.	"One-Second Piece"	0:04
36.	"One-Second Piece"	0:04
37.	"One-Second Piece"	0:04
38.	"One-Second Piece"	0:10
39.	"Organ Buildup"	1:05
40.	"Vocal"	6:29
41.	"Free Guitar"	6:27
42.	"One-Minute Imposition"	1:09
43.	"Piano"	2:11
44.	"Guitar"	1:29

== Personnel ==
Red Krayola

- Rick Barthelme – drums, production
- Steve Cunningham – bass guitar, production
- Mayo Thompson – guitar, vocals, production

Technical

- Walt Andrus – recording
- Les Blank – photography
