= Unterberger =

Unterberger is a German surname. Notable people with the surname include:

- Andreas Unterberger, Austrian curler and coach
- Anna Unterberger (born 1985), Italian actress
- Betty Miller Unterberger (1922–2012), American historian and professor
- Carola Unterberger-Probst (born 1978), Austrian media artist and philosopher of art
- Christof Unterberger (born 1970), Austrian cellist and composer
- Cristopher Unterberger (1732–1798), Italian painter
- David Unterberger (born 1988), Austrian ski jumper
- Ignaz Unterberger (1748–1797), Italian-Austrian painter and printmaker
- Julia Unterberger (born 1962), Italian politician
- Michelangelo Unterberger (1695–1758), Austrian painter
- Richie Unterberger (born 1962), American author and journalist
- Siegfried Unterberger (1893–1979), Austrian university teacher

== See also ==
- Unterberger test, used in otolaryngology to help assess whether a patient has a vestibular pathology
