= Schacht v. United States =

Daniel Jay Schacht v. United States
- Supreme Court of the United States

Argued March 31, 1970 Decided May 25, 1970
- Full case name: Daniel Jay Schacht v. United States
- Citations: 398 U.S. 58 (more) 90 S. Ct. 1555; 26 L. Ed. 2d 44; 1970 U.S. LEXIS 39

Case history
- Prior: United States v. Smith, 414 F.2d 630 (5th Cir. 1969)

Holding
- Held that the final clause of 10 U.S.C. § 772(f) was a violation of the First Amendment.

Court membership
- Chief Justice Warren E. Burger Associate Justices Hugo Black · William O. Douglas; John M. Harlan II · William J. Brennan Jr. Potter Stewart · Byron White; Thurgood Marshall

Case opinions
- Majority: Black
- Concurrence: Harlan
- Concurrence: White (in result), joined by Burger, Stewart

Laws applied
- U.S. Const. amend. I

Schacht v. United States, 398 U.S. 58 (1970), was a United States Supreme Court case, which ruled that actors could wear accurate military uniforms—regardless of the production's portrayal of the military—on First Amendment grounds.

== Background ==
On December 4, 1967, Daniel Jay Schacht and his friend, Jarrett Vandon Smith Jr., along with a third party, participated in a nationally coordinated protest of the Vietnam War by participating in a skit demonstrating the murder of Vietnamese civilians by the U.S. Military. The skit "was composed of three people. There was Schacht who was dressed in a uniform and cap. A second person [Smith] was wearing ‘military colored’ coveralls. The third person was outfitted in typical Viet Cong apparel. The first two men carried water pistols. One of them would yell, ‘Be an able American,’ and then they would shoot the Viet Cong with their pistols. The pistols expelled a red liquid which, when it struck the victim, created the impression that he was bleeding. Once the victim fell down the other two would walk up to him and exclaim, ‘My God, this is a pregnant woman.’ Without noticeable variation this skit was reenacted several times during the morning of the demonstration."

"That night, armed FBI agents cornered Danny's car and arrested him as he left his father's electronics plant. One of them bragged to Danny that he had spent the entire day trying to identify a federal crime they could charge him with . . . . [T]he statute he and Vandon Smith were charged with violating—designed to preclude civilians from impersonating members of the armed forces—had an exception: an actor in a theatrical or motion picture production could wear an armed forces uniform but . . . . only if the portrayal did not discredit that branch of the military. Put another way, it was okay to wear an army uniform so long as you spoke lovingly of the army. . . . During closing argument the assistant U.S. Attorney, 'Moose' Hartman, pointed at Danny and yelled, 'If Schacht comes to my house and expresses himself like this he won't be able to walk into this courtroom to stand trial.' Then he moved toward both boys: 'The only thing I gather from these defendants is that they are displeased with the government and the war. But I have a single answer to that. There is a plane and boat [sic] leaving two or three times a day for other parts of the world. I can probably name you gentlemen the place to go. If you don't like it, get out.' "

Smith and Schacht were indicted, tried by a jury and convicted of violating 18 U.S.C.A. § 702. U.S. District Judge James Noel sentenced Vandon Smith to probation. Then, while punching holes in a piece of paper with a pencil, Noel glared at Danny and said, "Schacht's express purpose was to discredit the United States, of this army in Vietnam, to leave the impression to all watching that the soldiers of the country were attacking innocent people who were being killed by shooting . . . In my opinion, the defendant acted heedlessly and he has not expressed the slightest bit of remorse." Noel sentenced Danny to the maximum possible term under the statute: a $250 fine and six months in a federal penitentiary. Sixteen days later, on March 15, 1968, US Army Lieutenant William Calley led his troops into the tiny village of Mai Lai, where they slaughtered at least 347 unarmed men, women, and children.

The Fifth Circuit Court of Appeals affirmed Danny's and Vandon Smith's convictions. Vandon Smith did not seek Supreme Court review. Schacht thought his ACLU lawyers had filed a petition for writ of certiorari in the Supreme Court, but they had failed to do so, and soon after the expiration of the time for filing the petition, a mandate was issued for his arrest. Danny surrendered to the U.S. Marshal Service just after Labor Day, 1969 and was sent to the federal penitentiary in Seagoville, Texas. A few days before, Schacht's father, also a political activist once arrested for displaying a sign in his yard supporting a black candidate for Houston's City Council, retained Berg. Berg and his lifelong friend, Stuart Nelkin, drafted a brief and filed the petition for writ 101 days late. The Supreme Court, which makes the rules, relaxed the rule setting deadlines for filing an appeal there, and, on December 15, 1969, granted certiorari, with three judges dissenting. Judge Noel, aware that the Court's decision granting cert signaled a likely reversal, released Schacht on bail pending the outcome of the appeal.

On March 31, 1970, Berg, then 28, argued the case before the U.S. Supreme Court against Solicitor General and former Dean of Harvard Law School, Erwin Griswold. On May 25, 1970, the Court unanimously reversed Schacht's conviction, striking that portion of the statute prohibiting portrayals of the military in a manner that tends to discredit that branch of the armed forces as a violation of free speech. Vandon Smith's conviction was vacated in later proceedings in the district court.

The Schacht decision legitimized what was called "guerilla theater" and set a precedent allowing late-filed cases to proceed in SCOTUS, if warranted by the circumstances.

== Challenged statutes ==
=== 18 U.S.C. 702 ===
"Whoever, in any place within the jurisdiction of the United States or in the Canal Zone, without authority, wears the uniform or a distinctive part thereof or anything similar to a distinctive part of the uniform of any of the armed forces of the United States, Public Health Service or any auxiliary of such, shall be fined not more than $250 or imprisoned not more than six months, or both."

=== 10 U.S.C. § 772(f) ===
"When wearing by persons not on active duty authorized....

(f) While portraying a member of the Army, Navy, Air Force, or Marine Corps, an actor in a theatrical or motion-picture production may wear the uniform of that armed force ~~if the portrayal does not tend to discredit that armed force~~."

== Holding ==
The Supreme Court held that 18 U.S.C. § 702 by itself was valid, i.e. that there could be a blanket ban on the wearing of military uniforms by those not in the military. However, 10 U.S.C. § 772 provided a list of exceptions, and the Court found that allowing actors to wear uniforms only if their role did not discredit the military was a violation of the actor's First Amendment right to Free Speech. This, in effect, struck the final clause of 10 U.S.C. § 772 (f).
