= Wieslaw Woszczyk =

Canadian music professor

- Born: Canada
- Occupations: Musician, musicologist, professor

Wieslaw Woszczyk is the James McGill Professor Research Chair of Music Technology at McGill University's School of Music. He finished his PhD at the University of Victoria. Between 1978 and 1998, he was director of the graduate program in sound recording, and between 1998 and 2001 he was chair of the Department of Theory. Additionally, Woszcyk is director of McGill Recording Studios and of the Laboratory of Virtual Acoustics Technology at the Schulich School of Music of McGill University. He is also the founding director of the Centre for Interdisciplinary Research in Music, Media and Technology. He has done significant research into international locations with leading acoustics. During the early 2000s, Woszczyk was an advocate and practitioner in the movement towards multichannel reproduction environments for the creation of sound recording. As a sound professional, he has worked with artists including Harry Belafonte and Philip Glass. In addition to his work in New York City with such artists, he is a cofounder of McGill Records.
