= Geoff Travis =

British businessman

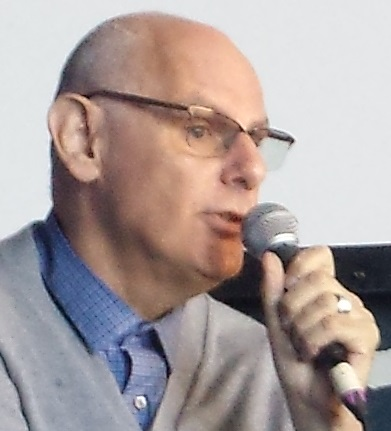
- Travis in 2016
- Born: 2 February 1952 (age 74); Stoke Newington, London, England
- Occupation: Record company/record shop manager
- Years active: Mid-1970s–present
- Known for: Head of Rough Trade Records

Geoff Travis (born 2 February 1952) is the founder of both Rough Trade Records and the Rough Trade chain of record shops. A former drama teacher and owner of a punk record shop, Travis founded the Rough Trade label in 1976.

== Biography ==
Travis was born on 2 February 1952 in Stoke Newington, London, and was raised in Finchley. He is Jewish, his ancestors emigrated from Romania and Ukraine. Travis read English at Churchill College, Cambridge. He worked as a drama teacher before opening the original Rough Trade record shop in Kensington Park Road, Notting Hill, London on 23 February 1976, setting up the record label two years later. He claimed that he chose the location because it was close to Powis Square, where Performance, one of his favourite films, was made. Travis was also instrumental in the foundation of the independent distribution network The Cartel. While Rough Trade was a key independent label, Travis also co-ran labels with major record companies, including Blanco y Negro in 1983 (with WEA) and Trade2 (with Island Records).

Rough Trade was home to The Smiths, but by 1986, after three years on the label, the group were in dispute over finances. The song "Frankly, Mr. Shankly" from The Queen is Dead was a jibe at Travis. The label was wound up in 1994 after briefly being revived in partnership with One Little Indian, but revived by Travis in 2001 with breakthrough acts The Strokes and The Libertines.

Writer Douglas Wolk credited Travis as virtually defining "the British post-punk sound", and XFM viewed his impact on independent music as greater than anyone else's in the country.
