= Stephen Prina =

American artist

- Born: 1954 (age 71–72); Galesburg, Illinois, U.S.
- Education: Northern Illinois University (BFA), California Institute of the Arts (MFA)
- Occupations: Artist, musician, composer, professor
- Employer(s): Harvard University (Professor, Department of Visual and Environmental Studies)
- Known for: Post-conceptualism, interdisciplinary art
- Notable work: Exquisite Corpse series, musical compositions

Stephen Prina (born 1954) is an American artist. His work has been categorized as post-conceptualism. Prina is a professor at the Department of Visual and Environmental Studies (VES) at Harvard University.

== Early life and education ==
Born in 1954, in Galesburg, Illinois, Prina received a BFA from Northern Illinois University in 1977 and an MFA from the California Institute of the Arts in 1980. At CalArts, his fellow students included Mike Kelley, Sue Williams, Tony Oursler and Jim Shaw. In 1980, he attended Thomas E. Crow's class on Courbet and Manet at UCLA.

== Work ==
Prina's work includes drawing, painting, sculpture, photography, installation, video and film. In Exquisite Corpse, a series begun in 1988, he set out to make a painting of the same size and shape as every painting recorded in a 1969 catalogue raisonné of Manet's works.

Prina is also a composer and musician who has interpreted works by Beethoven, Schoenberg, Sonic Youth, Steely Dan and many others. He taught at Art Center College of Design, in Pasadena, from 1980 until 2003. In 1994, he offered a much-discussed course about filmmaking in the 1980s and focused the class on Keanu Reeves as the actor had appeared in a diverse set of films that each exemplified a specific style; the course prompted stories in The New Yorker and Harper's Bazaar. Prina has been a professor at Harvard since 2004.

== Exhibitions ==
Solo exhibitions of his work have been mounted in museums throughout Europe and the United States including Spruth Magers, Los Angeles, US (2018); Museo Madre, Naples, Italy (2017); Museum Kurhaus Kleve (2016); Vienna Secession (2011); Centro Andaluz de Arte Contemporaeno, Seville (2008); Kölnischer Kunstverein, Cologne; the Art Institute of Chicago (2002); MAMCO, Geneva (1998); Museum Boijmans-van Beuningen, Rotterdam (1992); and The Renaissance Society, Chicago (1989).

He has participated in documenta IX, the Venice Biennale XLIV, and the 51st Carnegie International.

Prina has also been a willing collaborator, having co-produced significant exhibitions and projects with artists Wade Guyton, Mike Kelley, the band Red Krayola and curator Susanne Ghez at The Renaissance Society.

Prina is represented by Sprüth Magers in Los Angeles, New York, London and Berlin, Petzel Gallery in New York, Maureen Paley in London, and Capitain Petzel in Berlin.
