= Mayo Thompson =

American musician and visual artist (born 1944)

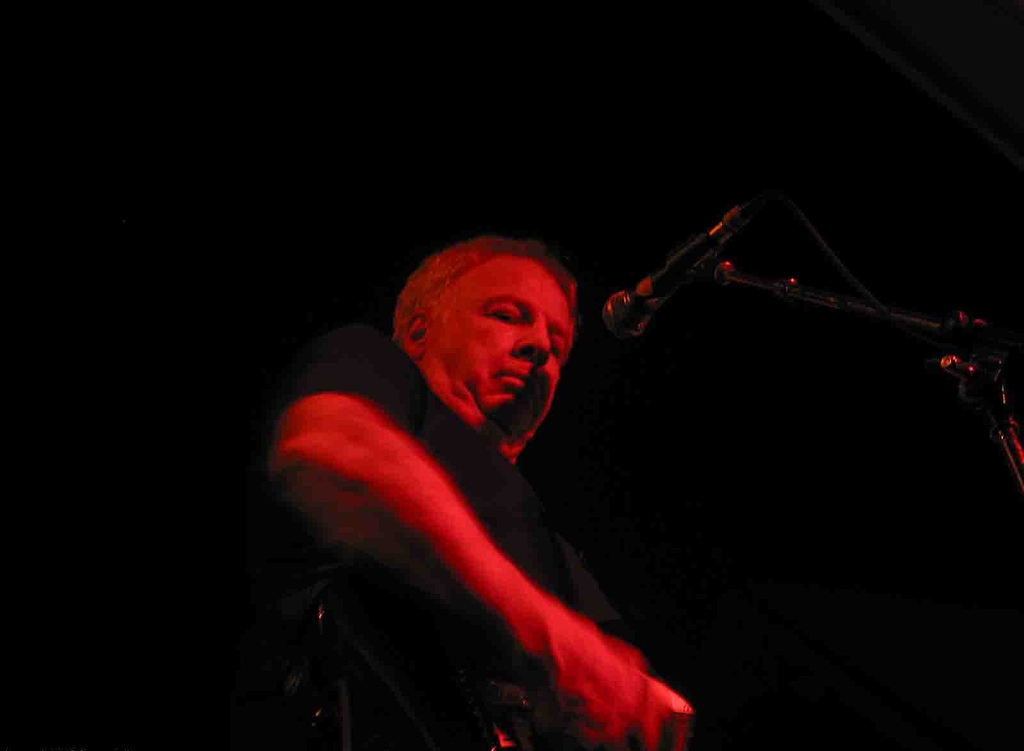
- Mayo Thompson live with the Red Krayola (Münster, May 2005)

Background information
- Born: Mayo Joseph Thompson, Jr. February 26, 1944 (age 82); Houston, Texas, US
- Genres: Rock; folk; avant-garde
- Occupations: Musician; visual artist; record producer
- Instruments: Vocals; guitar
- Years active: 1964–present
- Labels: International Artists; Texas Revolution; Radar; Rough Trade; Pure Freude; Glass; RecRec; Celluloid; Leiterwagen; Sordide Sentimental; Drag City
- Formerly of: Saddlesore, The Rockin' Blue Diamonds, Pere Ubu, COWWS Quintet

Mayo Joseph Thompson Jr. (born February 26, 1944) is an American musician and visual artist best known as the leader of the experimental rock band Red Krayola. He released his debut solo album Corky's Debt to His Father in 1970, and later collaborated with the English conceptual art collective Art & Language. He formed the band Saddlesore with Rick Barthelme, Frank Davis and Cassell Webb in 1971, and the Rockin' Blue Diamonds in 1972 with Barthelme, Rock Romano and Tucker Bradley. He later worked with Greek composer Manos Hatzidakis and artist Robert Rauschenberg.

By the late 1970s, he moved to England and began working with Rough Trade where he co-produced releases with Geoff Travis for groups such as the Monochrome Set, Stiff Little Fingers, the Raincoats, the Fall, Scritti Politti, Blue Orchids, LiLiPUT and Cabaret Voltaire. Thompson briefly joined the band Pere Ubu and was credited as an associate producer for the Smiths' "The Queen Is Dead" music video. He contributed to film soundtracks for Lizzie Borden's Born in Flames and Derek Jarman's The Last of England. He later produced the Chills, Felt, Shop Assistants and Primal Scream in the mid-to late 1980s. Thompson would move to Germany and collaborate with artists and musicians such as Albert Oehlen, Dieter Moebius and Conny Plank.

During the 1990s, Thompson moved back to the United States, signed to the label Drag City and briefly joined the German free improvisation group COWWS Quintet. In 1994, he taught at the Art Center College of Design in Pasadena until 2008. His paintings and visual artwork were later exhibited at Galerie Buchholz. He released two novels Art & Mystery (2018) and After Math: Art, Mystery - Part II (2023).

== Early life ==
Mayo Joseph Thompson Jr. was born on February 26, 1944, at St. Joseph Medical Center in Houston, Texas, to father Mayo Joseph Thomson Sr. and mother Hazel Margaret Muhl. Shortly after he was born, his parents divorced. Thompson grew up alone with his mother in Houston, who became a teacher at San Jacinto High School. His father, Mayo Thompson Sr. had previously been in the armed services, and later became a lawyer and member of the Federal Trade Commission.

Thompson's formal education includes Garden of Arts Kindergarten until Holy Rosary Elementary School through fifth grade, then Moye Military School until high school at Cascia Hall College Preparatory School, from which he received a diploma in 1962. He went on to study at the University of St. Thomas, where he tried variously, off and on, pre-Law, Creative Writing, English and American Literature, Philosophy, and Art History, before dropping out.

== Career ==
=== 1950s–1960s ===
In 1955, Mayo Thompson began taking piano lessons at the age of 11, where he first became interested in composing music. In 1958, he jammed once in the music building of Moye Military School on piano with a friend who played trumpet and drums. Thompson went on to study at the University of St. Thomas, where he found an "affinity for jazz". In 1963, he met Frederick Barthelme (brother of novelist Donald Barthelme). On November 15, 1964, Thompson performed a cover of "Baby, Please Don't Go" at the University of St. Thomas. At the time, Thompson was a part of a folk music parody band known as the Seventy-Three Balalaikas, which consisted of Sam Irwin of the Sixpence, Bob Raines and Paul Norris.

In 1965, Thompson embarked on a school trip to Europe. On returning, he was inspired by Beatlemania to start a rock band. He later stated he was "more interested in creating new material than interpreting old material". In mid-1966, amid the burgeoning Houston psychedelic scene, Thompson formed the band Red Crayola with Rick Barthelme and Steve Cunningham, they signed to International Artists after being discovered by producer Lelan Rogers performing for radio station KNUZ's Battle of the Bands event at the Gulfgate Mall. They became labelmates with the 13th Floor Elevators, with Roky Erickson performing on their debut album.

In late 1967, Rick Barthelme left the Red Crayola, leading to Thompson briefly working as a sound man for Joseph Byrd and his band the United States of America in Los Angeles. In March 1968, Thompson began working with local musician Johndavid Bartlett at Gold Star Studios, the same place where "She's About a Mover" was recorded. Bartlett had joined in on rehearsals during the Red Crayola's early days and would sometimes get the opportunity to play his own original songs. Because of this, Thompson took an affinity for his songwriting and got him signed to the International Artists record label. He started producing the album which contained instrumental cameos from Johnny Winter, Jimmy Reed and Stacy Sutherland of the 13th Floor Elevators. The album was to be called Mother's Milk; however, by the time it was supposed to be released, the label folded and the tapes were lost.

=== 1970s ===
In 1970, Thompson released his debut solo album, Corky's Debt To His Father, which employed "the best session musicians in Houston" and was recorded at Walt Andrus' Andrus Studio and released on his label Texas Revolution. However, because the label's executives did not like Thompson's voice, the album was made available only by mail order. Subsequently, Thompson and Barthelme formed the Houston band Saddlesore with Cassell Webb. The trio released one single on Texas Revolution, with "Old Tom Clark" on the A-side and "Pig Ankle Strut" on the B-side. The label later folded and the band split up. Additionally, Thompson would provide illustrations for Barthelme's novel Rangoon (1970).

In 1971, he moved from Houston to New York. Christine Kozlov, whom Thompson had met in 1969, introduced him to the British art collective Art & Language, whom he described as "the baddest bastards on the block". At this time, he also met Mel Ramsden. In 1972, he formed a jam band known as the Rockin' Blue Diamonds. The group originally consisted of Frederick Barthelme along with Rock Romano and Tucker Bradley on vocals, but later included Fred McLain on lead guitar, Bob Henschen on piano, Bernard Sampson on saxophone and flute, Don Jones on bass, Art Kidd on drums, and Thompson on rhythm guitar and as the primary songwriter. They performed a few shows, and Fahey offered Thompson $250 to record a demo. However, Fahey and his wife did not like the recording, and the group later disbanded. Thompson later sampled Bob Henschen's 1971 piano recordings at the end of Fingerpainting.

In 1973, Thompson began working with Greek composer Manos Hatzidakis on an album that was later cancelled. He later worked as a studio assistant for Robert Rauschenberg, whom he met by chance in Paris. They collaborated on an unfinished film titled Mostly About Rauschenberg (1975), produced by Reiner Moritz. Thompson also worked with Rauschenberg in Greece and Israel, alongside Christine Kozlov.

In 1974, Thompson and Art & Language began recording the album Corrected Slogans (1976) in England. The album featured drummer Jesse Chamberlain, who later joined Arthur Russell's band the Necessaries and who was the son of sculptor John Chamberlain and Lorraine Belcher Chamberlain, Frank Zappa's former girlfriend. In 1976, the New York branch of Art & Language recorded video performances entitled "Struggle in New York" and "Nine Gross and Conspicuous Errors", which featured Thompson and Jesse Chamberlain. The former featured filmmaker Kathryn Bigelow, who at the time was a member of the New York underground scene.

After the release of Corrected Slogans, Thompson fell out with Art & Language and remained in England. He was interviewed by Pete Frame, who was working as the press agent for Stiff Records, and he met with Virgin Records' Simon Draper, who expressed interest in issuing a one-off single. He also met Andrew Lauder who'd later form Radar Records and reissue the Red Crayola's original material, with Thompson releasing new Red Crayola singles under Radar. Thompson also became involved with Geoff Travis's distribution business at Rough Trade Records. When the label decided to begin releasing records in 1978, Thompson was asked by Travis to assist in producing "He's Frank" by the Monochrome Set, because Travis did not feel confident in the studio. Thompson would produce and co-produce releases for several other acts such as Stiff Little Fingers, the Raincoats, the Fall, Scritti Politti, Blue Orchids, LiLiPUT and Cabaret Voltaire.

=== 1980s ===
In 1980, Thompson wrote and composed the song "Born in Flames" with Art & Language, the track would later be featured in director Lizzie Borden's film of the same name. He later joined Pere Ubu on their albums The Art of Walking (1980) and Song of the Bailing Man (1982) as well as on several tours and live albums such as One Man Drives While the Other Man Screams. Thompson had originally met the band through a joint tour with Red Krayola in 1978.

He played accordion on the David Thomas and the Pedestrians album The Sound of the Sand and Other Songs of the Pedestrian (1981), and also appeared with the band in the 1982 film Urgh! A Music War. That same year, he started to compose the musical score of Victorine, the opera written by Art & Language for the Documenta 7. Pere Ubu disbanded later that year due to tensions surrounding the recording sessions for Song of the Bailing Man. Thompson stated, he and Feelies drummer Anton Fier "didn't get along well at all", reportedly due to Fier's perfectionism in re-doing takes.

In 1983, Thompson moved to Germany and joined its contemporary art scene, he recorded a series of monologues and vocal tracks for a collaborative effort with German musicians Dieter Moebius and Conny Plank. The recordings were shelved for 15 years but were finally released as Ludwig's Law in 1998. He also recorded "commercial jingles" for companies such as C&A and Adidas. In 1987, he began collaborating with the German painter Albert Oehlen, first on a soundtrack for the film The Last of England by Derek Jarman. Additionally, through working for Rough Trade, Thompson persuaded Jarman to film a promotional video for the Smiths, which became the music video for The Queen Is Dead. Thompson was credited as an associate producer.

At around that time, he'd continue to produce records for alternative rock bands, with notable releases including the 1986 single "I Don't Wanna Be Friends With You" by the Shop Assistants as well as their debut album. While in 1987, he produced Brave Words by the Chills, Poem of the River by Felt and Sonic Flower Groove by Primal Scream.

=== 1990s–2020s ===
Throughout the 1990s and 2000s, Thompson continued to produce releases for artists and collaborate on several projects. He joined the German free improvisation group COWWS Quintet, which was led by artists Rüdiger Carl and Irène Schweizer. In 1994, he accepted a teaching position at the Art Center College of Design in Pasadena, which ended in 2008. The following year, he released the album Shotgun Wedding with Sven-Åke Johansson Quintett.

In the 2010s, Thompson's paintings and visual artwork were exhibited at Galerie Buchholz in a show, titled "?." The show presented works on paper, including a series of illustrations, "Drawings for 'Rangoon'," which Thompson made for Frederick Barthelme's 1970 book Rangoon. "Figure Study (Victorine)," was also exhibited at the show as a series of sketched character studies for the unfinished Art & Language opera called Victorine which Thompson had been working on since the 1980s.

In 2013, Thompson formed the Corky Band and performed the entirety of Corky's Debt to His Father for the first time at the Cropped Out music festival in Louisville, Kentucky. He later performed the album at New York's (Le) Poisson Rouge in 2019 and the following year at California's Hammer Museum. In 2016, Thompson exhibited a series of "Political Cartoons" with motifs lifted from Communist propaganda posters.

In 2018, he released the novel Art & Mystery and later its sequel After Math: Art, Mystery - Part II in 2023, which was accompanied by an audiobook that he self-read.

== Personal life ==
On February 19, 1969, Thompson married "Daniella" born 1946. The marriage would be mentioned in Rick Barthelme's second novel "War and War" released in 1971. The pair divorced on June 20th, 1972. He later married conceptual artist Christine Kozlov. Thompson and Kozlov divorced in the mid-to-late 1980s.

Since 2009, Thompson has lived with his wife Maria Vogelauer and their dog in California.

== Legacy ==
Pitchfork attributes Mayo Thompson as "the primary oracle for a generation of art punks, industrial savants, and new-wave scientists". His production credits were associated with "classic punk albums", while writer Rob Young noted him as a "fully fledged professional producer" and "a crucial addition to Rough Trade's floating collective of associates". Music critic Simon Reynolds argued Thompson co-produced with Geoff Travis "many of the best postpunk bands of the era". Thompson's solo work has influenced artists such as David Grubbs, Jeff Mangum, Peter Kember, and Andrew VanWyngarden.

In 2009, Paul Haig covered "Horses" from Corky's Debt to His Father. While in 2011, Lower Dens covered "Dear Betty Baby", later covered by Galaxie 500's Dean Wareham in 2025 on his solo album That's the Price of Loving Me.

== Discography ==
=== Studio albums ===
Title	Album details
Corky's Debt to His Father	Released: 1970; Label: Self-released; Format: Vinyl, digital download, streaming

=== With Pere Ubu ===
Title	Album details
The Art of Walking	Released: 1980; Label: Rough Trade; Format: Vinyl, CD, digital download, streaming
Song of the Bailing Man	Released: 1982; Label: Rough Trade; Format: Vinyl, CD, digital download, streaming

=== With Sven-Åke Johansson Quintett ===
Title	Album details
Shotgun Wedding	Released: 2009; Label: FMP; Format: CD, digital download, streaming

=== Collaborations ===
Title	Album details
Ludwig's Law	Released: 1998; Label: Drag City; Format: CD, digital download, streaming
Book	Released: 1998; Artist: COWWS Quintet; Label: Unknown; Format: CD, digital download, streaming
In the Beginning	Released: 1998; Artist: Girl Friday; Label: Unknown; Format: CD, digital download, streaming

== Notable production credits ==
- God Bless the Red Krayola and All Who Sail With It by Red Krayola (1968)
- He's Frank / Alphaville by The Monochrome Set (1979)
- Inflammable Material by Stiff Little Fingers (1979)
- Fairytale in the Supermarket / In Love / Adventures Close to Home by the Raincoats (1979)
- You / Ü by Kleenex/LiLiPUT (1979)
- Gotta Gettaway / Bloody Sunday by Stiff Little Fingers (1979)
- Nag Nag Nag / Is That Me (Finding Someone at the Door Again?) by Cabaret Voltaire (1979)
- The Raincoats by the Raincoats (1979)
- Fiery Jack by the Fall (1980)
- Grotesque (After the Gramme) by the Fall (1980)
- Are You Glad To Be In America? by James Blood Ulmer (1980)
- Shop Assistants by Shop Assistants (1986)
- Brave Words by the Chills (1987)
- Poem Of The River by Felt (1987)
- Sonic Flower Groove by Primal Scream (1987)
- Manhattan Beach by Overpass (1994)
- Japan in Paris in L.A. by Red Krayola (2004)

== Bibliography ==
- Young, Rob (2006). Rough Trade. Black Dog Publishing. ISBN 978-1-904772-47-7.
- Pelly, Jenn (2017). The Raincoats' The Raincoats. A&C Black Advantage. ISBN 978-1501302404.
- Reynolds, Simon (2005). Rip It Up and Start Again: Postpunk 1978–1984. London: Faber and Faber. ISBN 978-0-14-303672-2.
- Unterberger, Richie (1998). Unknown Legends of Rock'N Roll: Psychedelic Unknowns, Mad Geniuses, Punk Pioneers, Lo-Fi Mavericks & More. Backbeat Books. ISBN 978-0879305345.
