= List of keytars =

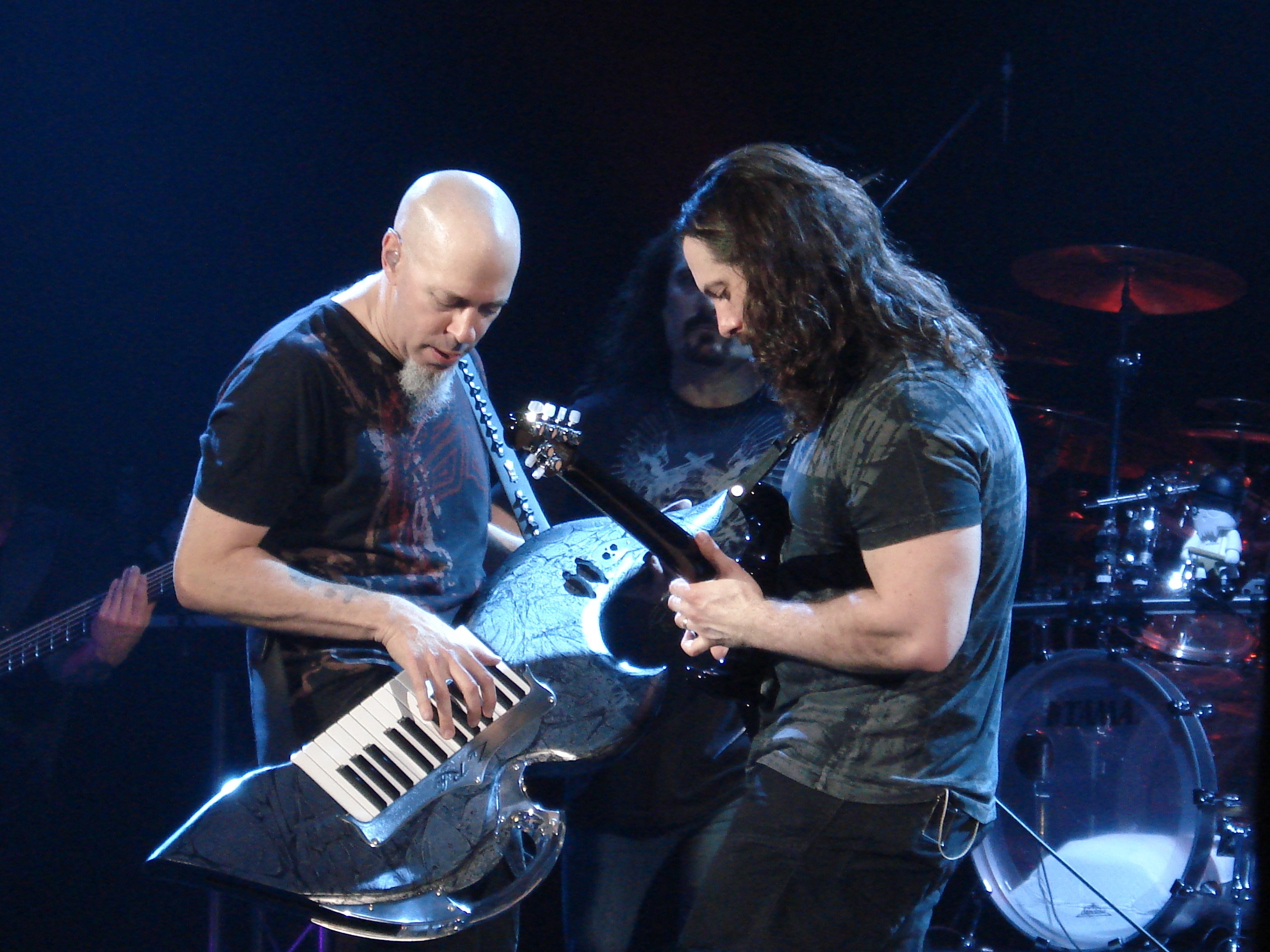
Jordan Rudess of Dream Theater playing a Zen Riffer keytar alongside guitarist John Petrucci

A keytar is a keyboard or synthesizer hung around the neck and shoulders, similar to a guitar.

== List of keytars ==
- [no grip] — keyboard model without control grip.
- [opt grip] — keyboard model with optional control grip.

| Dates | Model | Type | I/F | Notes |
|---|---|---|---|---|
| 1795 | Orphica | acoustic piano | – | a portable miniature piano in horizontal harp form. |
| 1963 | Weltmeister Basset | electric bass piano using struck reed | – | an electric piano bass, similar to Hohner Bass or Rhodes PianoBass, used by dance bands in East Germany probably late 1960s. |
| 1966 | Joh Mustad Tubon (in the UK: Livingston) | electronic bass organ | – | tube-shaped monophonic electronic keyboard instrument with guitar strap. Used by Paul McCartney of The Beatles on the original demo of "Strawberry Fields Forever" (1966), Ralf Hütter of Kraftwerk on the album Kraftwerk (1970), Swedish and Finnish bands during the 1970s, including Lådan. |
| 1977 | Hillwood Rockeyboard RB-1 | synth piano with VCF & volume pedals | – | influenced by Edgar Winter's style of hanging a keyboard from a neck. Used by Haruo Chikada (The Vibratones). |
| 1977 | Powell Probe | controller | CV/Gate | Roger Powell's keytar by Royalex |
| 1979 | PMS Syntar | synthesizer | CV/Gate | an earliest synthesizer keytar product, prior to the Moog Liberation in 1980 |
| 1980 | Davis Clavitar | controller | CV/Gate | used by George Duke, Herbie Hancock in 1980. |
| 1980 | Moog Liberation | synthesizer | CV/Gate | |
| 1980 | Royalex Probe | controller | CV/Gate | Jan Hammer's keytar by Royalex, ca. 1980. |
| 1982 | Dynacord Rhythm Stick (Jamma) | percussion controller | MIDI & CV/Gate | used by Michael Jackson (1996-7), Billy Ocean, Sabrina Salerno (1988), Manu Katche, and Curt Cress. |
| 1982 | Roland SH-101^{[opt grip]} | synthesizer | CV/Gate | control grip was optional. |
| 1982 | Sequential Circuits Remote Prophet | controller | SCB | controller for Prophet-5 synthesizer using proprietary serial interface. Used by Geoffrey Downes of ASIA and Dave Stewart. |
| 1982 | Yamaha CS01^{[no grip]} | synthesizer with optional breath controller BC1 or BC2 | CV/Gate | used by Chick Corea in the early 1980s. |
| 1983 | Yamaha KX1 | controller | MIDI | used by Herbie Hancock in 1983, George Duke in 1983. |
| 1983 | Korg Poly-800^{[no grip]} | synthesizer | MIDI | |
| c. 1983 | Yamaha CS01II | synthesizer with optional breath controller BC1 or BC3 | CV/Gate | |
| c. 1984 | Korg Poly-800 MkII^{[no grip]} | synthesizer | MIDI | |
| 1984 | Casio CZ-101^{[no grip]} | synthesizer | MIDI | a medium size keyboard with strap pins |
| 1984 | Korg RK-100 | controller | MIDI | |
| 1984 | Yamaha KX5 | controller | MIDI | a medium depth keyboard |
| 1985 | Lync LN1 (The Lync) | controller | MIDI | |
| 1985 | Roland AXIS | controller | MIDI | |
| 1985 | Yamaha DX100^{[no grip]} | synthesizer | MIDI | a mini keyboard with strap pins |
| 1986 | Casio AZ-1 | controller | MIDI | |
| 1986 | Siel DK70^{[opt grip]} | synthesizer | MIDI | control grip was optional |
| 1987 | Korg 707^{[no grip]} | synthesizer | MIDI | a synthesizer with strap pins |
| 1987 | Yamaha SHS-10 | electronic keyboard | MIDI | |
| c. 1987 | Tyco HotKeyz | toy keyboard | – | a toy keyboard |
| 1988 | Lync LN4 | controller | MIDI | also Jan Hammer signature model existed. |
| 1988 | Yamaha SHS-200 | electronic keyboard | MIDI | |
| 1989 | Tsumura JD21 | percussion controller | MIDI | |
| 1990 | Lync LN1000 | controller | MIDI | |
| c. 1990 | Formanta Mini | synthesizer | MIDI | |
| 1991 | Junost 21 | synthesizer | MIDI | |
| c. 1992 | Baldoni MIDI Accord | accordion controller ? | MIDI | Strap-on keyboard controller in the keytar style, with the chromatic buttons on the left-hand, and piano keyboard on the right-hand. |
| 1993 | Roland AX-1 | controller | MIDI | |
| 1994 | Zendrum | percussion controller | MIDI | |
| 1995 | The Drumstick | percussion controller | MIDI | used by E. Dr. Smith |
| c. 2000 | Suzuki MK-3600; YAMAHA YMK-80 | electronic keyboard | MIDI | a keyboard for marching band |
| 2000 | Lag LeKey | controller | MIDI | |
| 2001 | Roland AX-7 | controller | MIDI | |
| c. 2002 | Casio SA-75 | electronic keyboard | MIDI | a mini electronic keyboard with handsfree microphone and strap pins |
| c. 2007 | Zen Riffer Solo Axe | controller | MIDI | |
| 2008 | Behringer UMA25S^{[no grip]} | controller | USB & MIDI | |
| 2009 | Roland AX-Synth | synthesizer | USB & MIDI | |
| 2009 | Stoneboard | controller | MIDI | |
| 2010 | Politrep^{[no grip]} | controller | MIDI | |
| 2010 | Roland Lucina AX-09 | synthesizer | USB & MIDI | |
| 2010 | Mad Catz Rock Band 3 Wireless Pro Keyboard | controller & video game controller | MIDI & console specific | |
| 2012 | Alesis Vortex | controller | USB & MIDI | |
| 2014 | Alesis Vortex Wireless | controller | USB & MIDI | first keytar with wireless USB connection to a PC or laptop |
| 2014 | Korg RK-100S | synthesizer | USB & MIDI | used by Rick Astley in 2016 |
| 2017 | Yamaha Vocaloid Keyboard | synthesizer | USB, Bluetooth LE | To be released in "Winter 2017". First wearable prototype in 2014; limited rental available in 2015 |
| 2018 | Alesis Vortex Wireless 2 | controller | USB & MIDI | |
| 2018 | Roland AX-Edge | synthesizer | USB, MIDI, Bluetooth LE | |
| 2019 | Behringer MS-1 | synthesizer | USB & MIDI | Clone of the original 1982 Roland SH-101 |
| 2019 | Yamaha Sonogenic SHS-500 | electronic keyboard | USB MIDI, Bluetooth LE | Built-in speaker |
| 2019 | Yamaha Sonogenic SHS-300 | electronic keyboard | USB MIDI, Bluetooth LE (Select countries) | Built-in speaker |
| 2018 | Yamaha Vocaloid VKB-100 | electronic keyboard | USB MIDI, Bluetooth LE | Built-in speaker |
| 2020 | Korg RK-100S 2 | synthesizer | USB & MIDI | Wooden body and new programs |

== Custom/rare keytars ==
=== Rare keytar products ===
- Delmar Brown "Illuminator" (illuminating display attached to keytar)
- Guess Musical Instruments "Schizotron", a product which combined keyboard and guitar/bass
- "Nissin C-16", a custom keytar version of Casio SK-1, distributed as lottery goods for promoting Nissin Cup Noodles
- Suzuki "Omnichord" and "QChord", electronic chord instruments inspired by Oscar Schmidt Autoharp
- "Zen Riffer", used most notably by Jordan Rudess of Dream Theater.

=== Drum/Percussion keytars ===
- Dynacord Rhythm Stick (also known as "Jamma" since 1982)
- Formanta UDS drum controller
- Tsumura JD21
- Drumitar / Zendrum (2008)
- "Riday T91"

=== Custom made keytars ===
In alphabetical order:
- "Alien Guitar Simulator", a selfmade keytar by Le Orme keyboard player Michele Bon.
- "Arcadetar", a keytar-like keyboard controller combined a pitch sensor in 20 inch. (50 cm) long, developed by Italian musician Andrea Lomuscio of Teapot Industries in 2012.
- Jeri Ellsworth's FPGA-based C64 keytar
- Lady Gaga's custom made keytar during The Monster Ball Tour in 2010.
- "Lag Circulaire" made for Jean Michel Jarre
- "Lag Insecte" made for Jean Michel Jarre
- "Lag Mad Max" made for Jean Michel Jarre
- Matt Bellamy's "Keytarcaster" Manson, made for playing Undisclosed Desires from Muse's 5th studio album, The Resistance
- Prince's "PurpleAxxe", also played by Tommy Barbarella
- "Politrep", a copy of the Zen Riffer keytar made by order at the website space4keys.com
- "Remote" for Jean Michel Jarre's studio by Lag
- "Syblade", a keytar designed to be unique and to inspire.

=== Customized keytars ===
Based on minimoog keyboards
- Custom minimoog keyboard used by Gary Wright and Steve Porcaro around 1976.
- Cruder, Jan Hammer's early custom keyboard with block shaped controller.
- Plexi minimoog keyboard used by George Duke

Based on Yamaha KX series
- Jean Michel Jarre's custom KX5, two versions: Houston and Docklands Concerts.
- Lights Poxleitner plays a rare Yamaha KX5 keytar.

Based on Roland AX series
- Vadim Pruzhanov of DragonForce and Henrik Klingenberg of Sonata Arctica both use a custom Roland AX-7 (although nowadays Henrik Klingenberg uses custom Roland AX-1)
- Christopher Bowes of Alestorm owns a Roland AX-7 which he has customised over the years with various stickers of animals.
- Jeff Abbott, long-time keytar player and product demonstrator for MusicLab plays a custom wooden keytar based around a Roland AX-1.
- Lady Gaga's keytar seen during The Fame Ball Tour in 2009 based on a modified Roland AX-Synth.

== Gallery ==
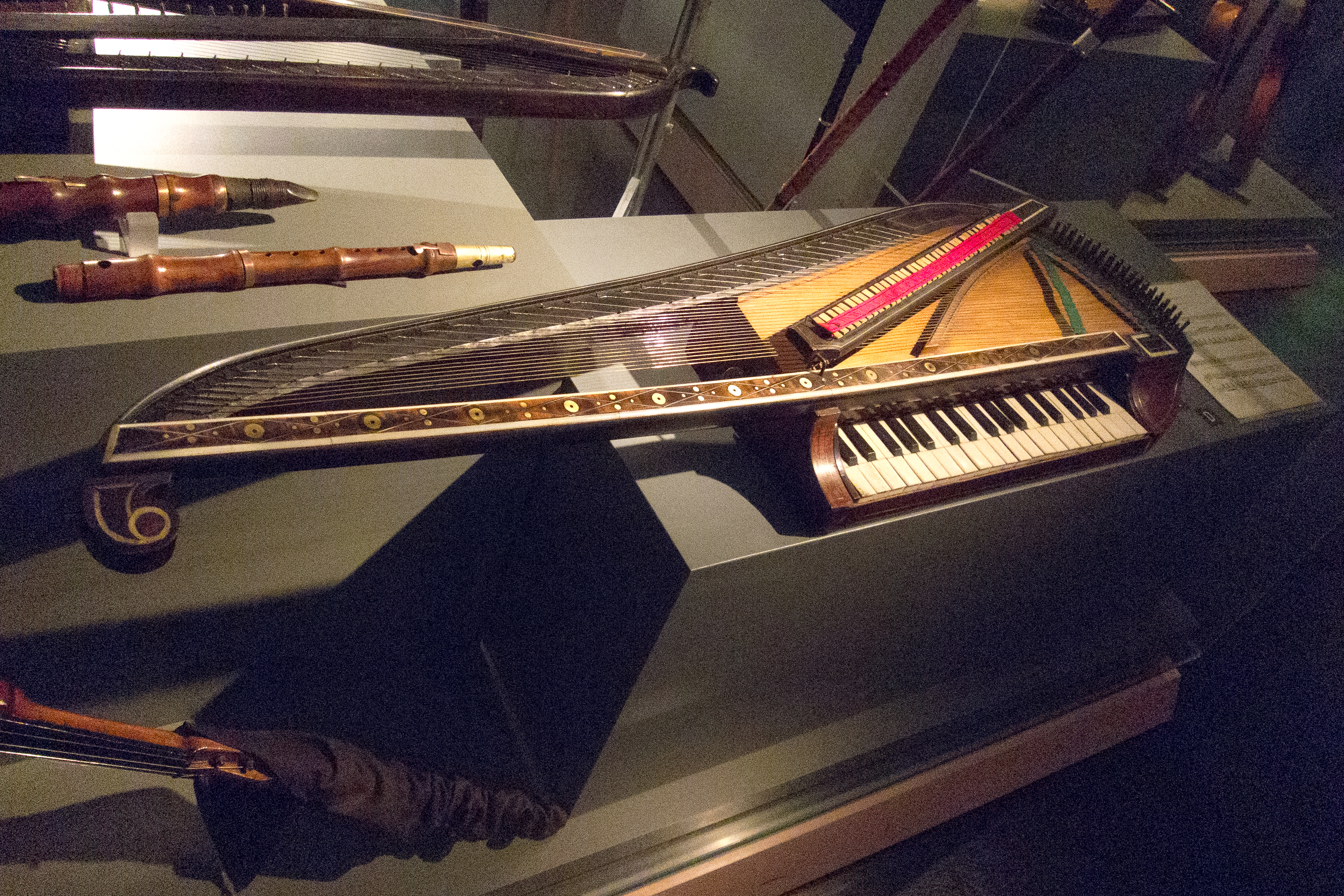
Orphica (18th–19th century)

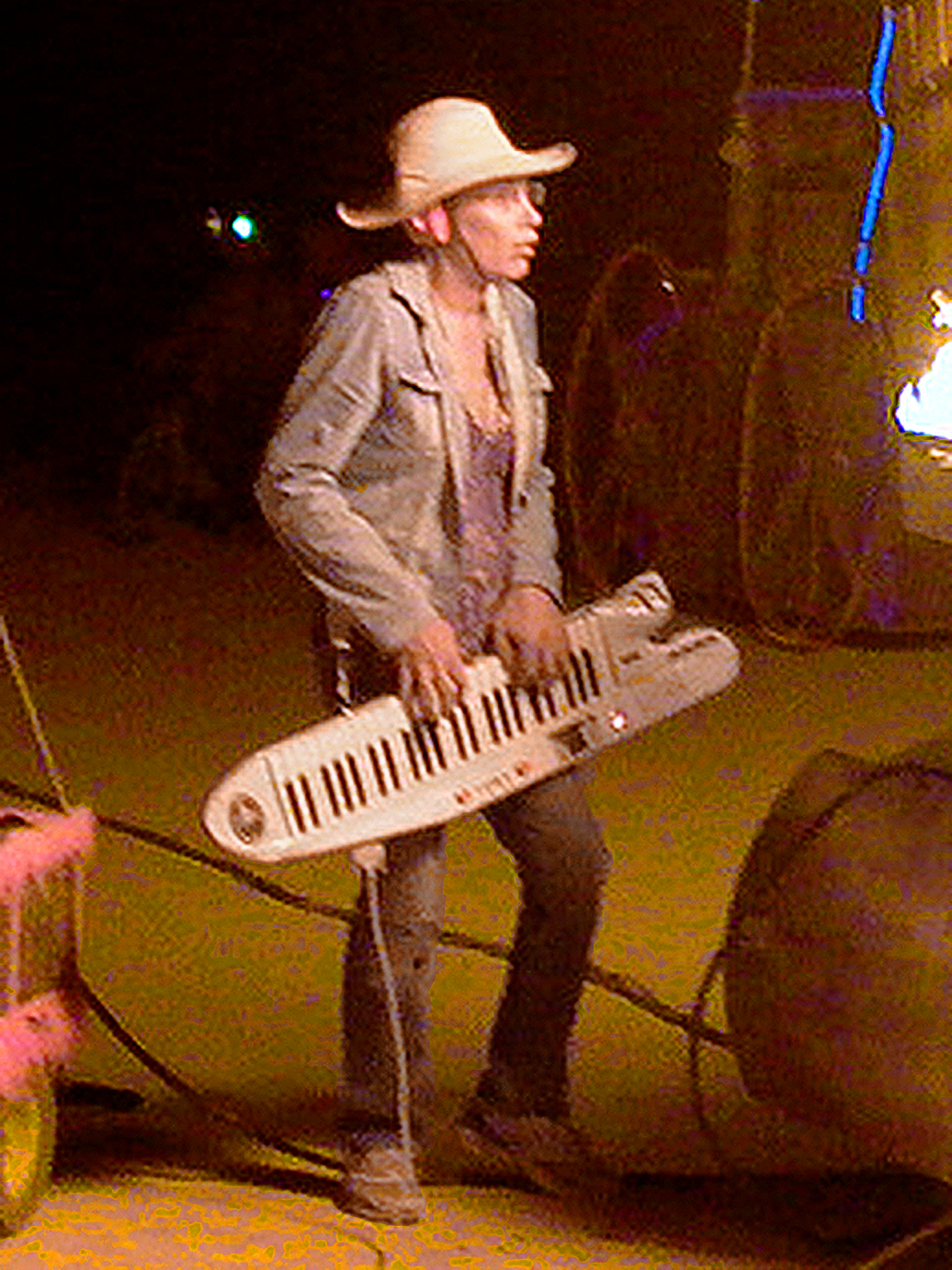
Royalex Probe (1977/1980) played by Lucy Hosking

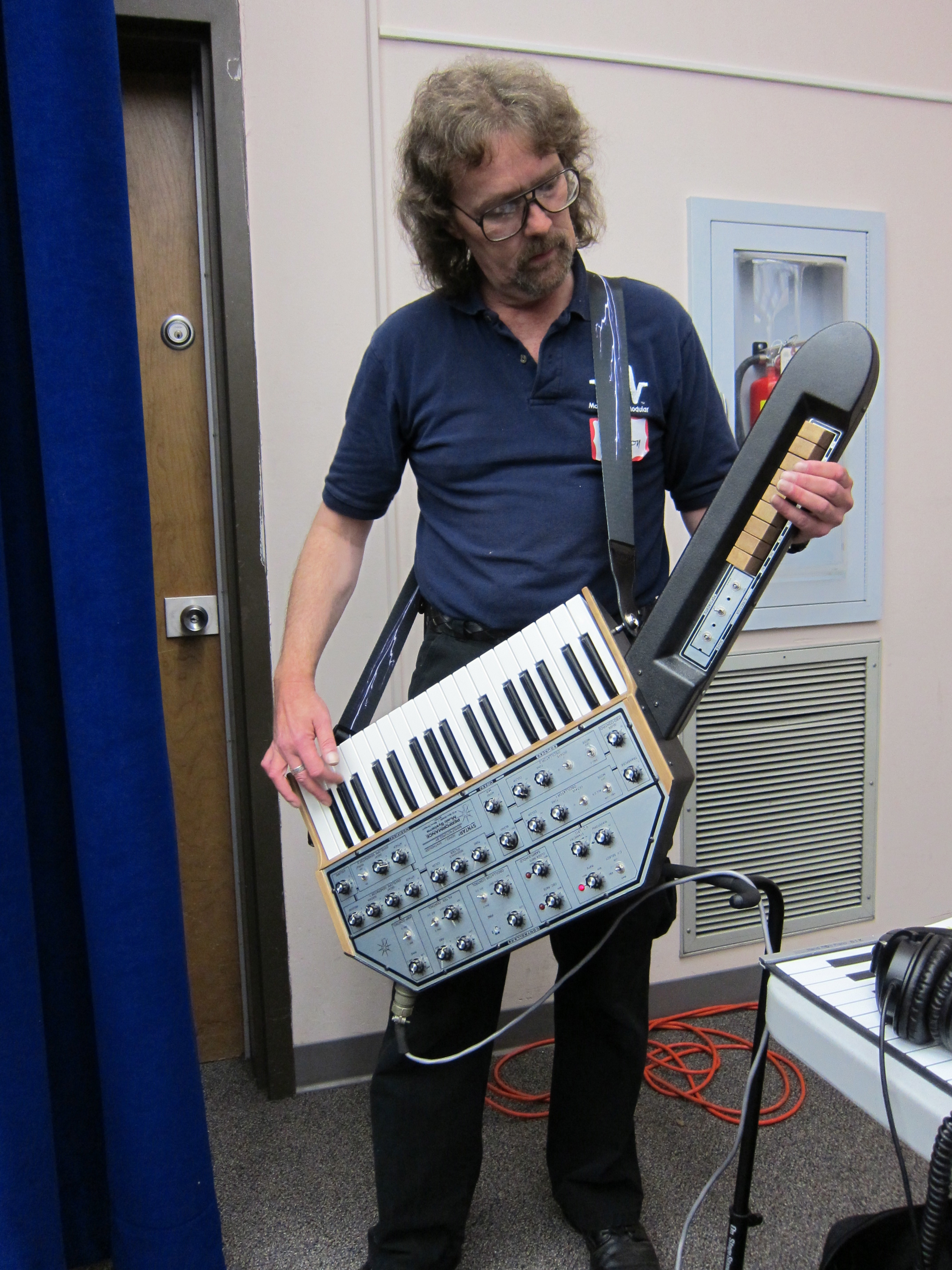
PMS Syntar (1979) by George Mattson

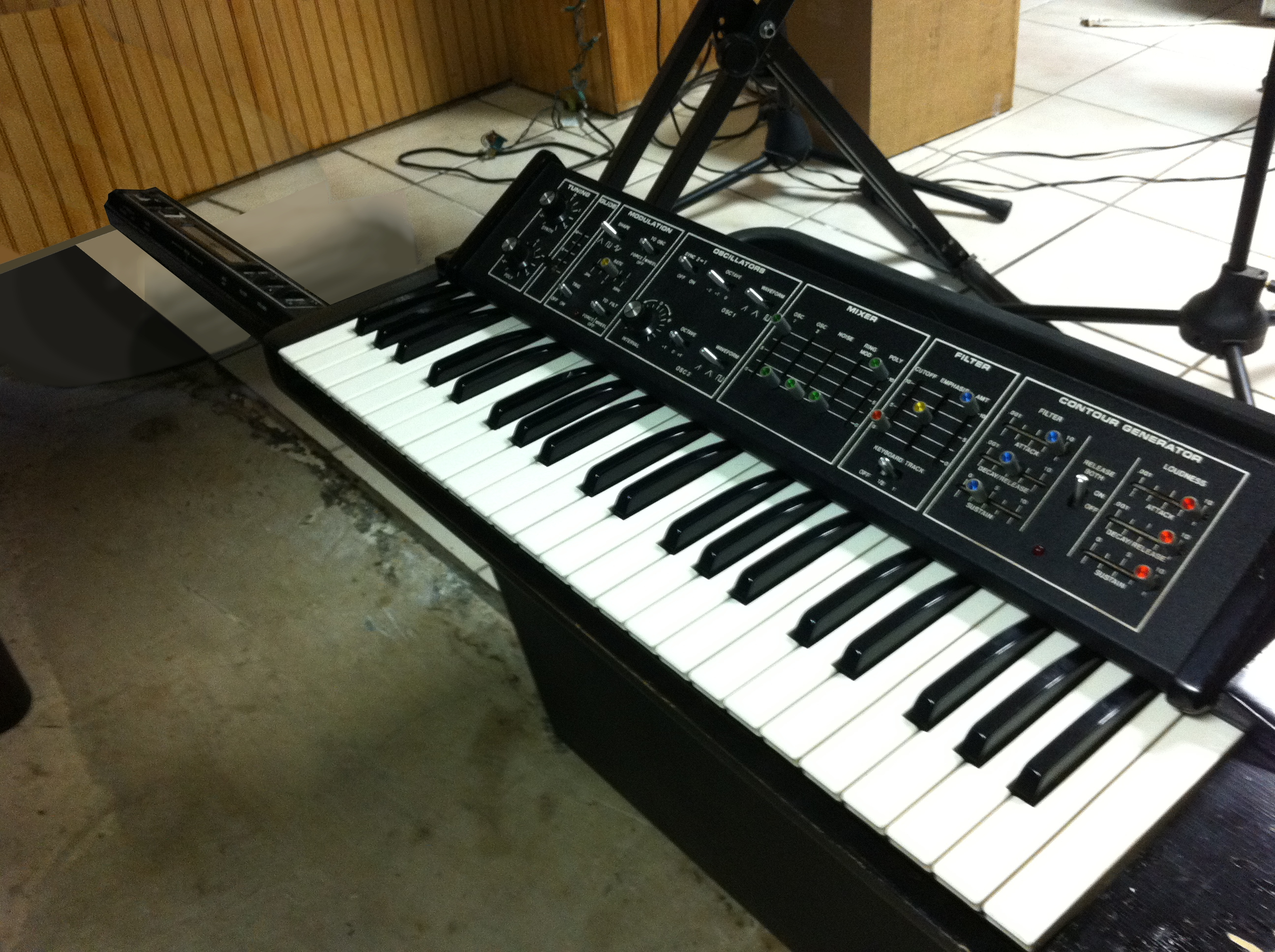
Moog Liberation (1980)

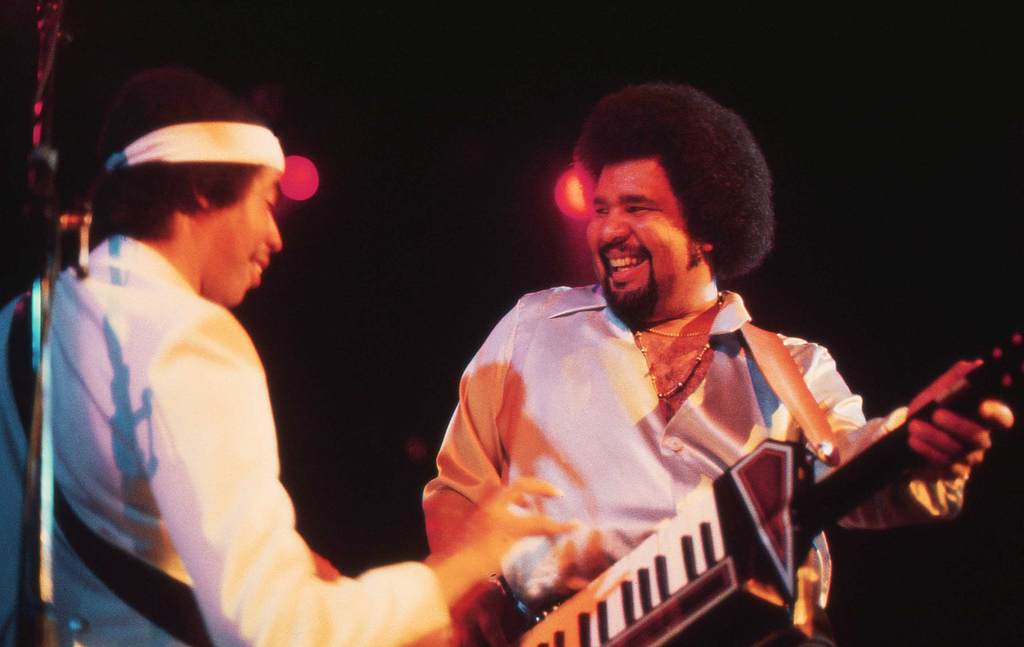
Davis Clavitar (1980) played by George Duke

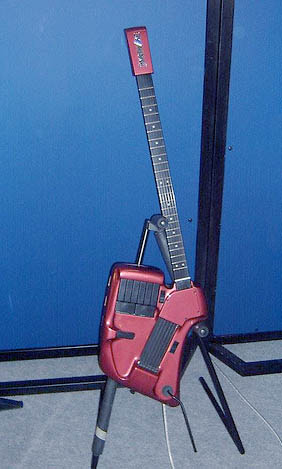
SynthAxe (1985) by Bill Aitken, et al.

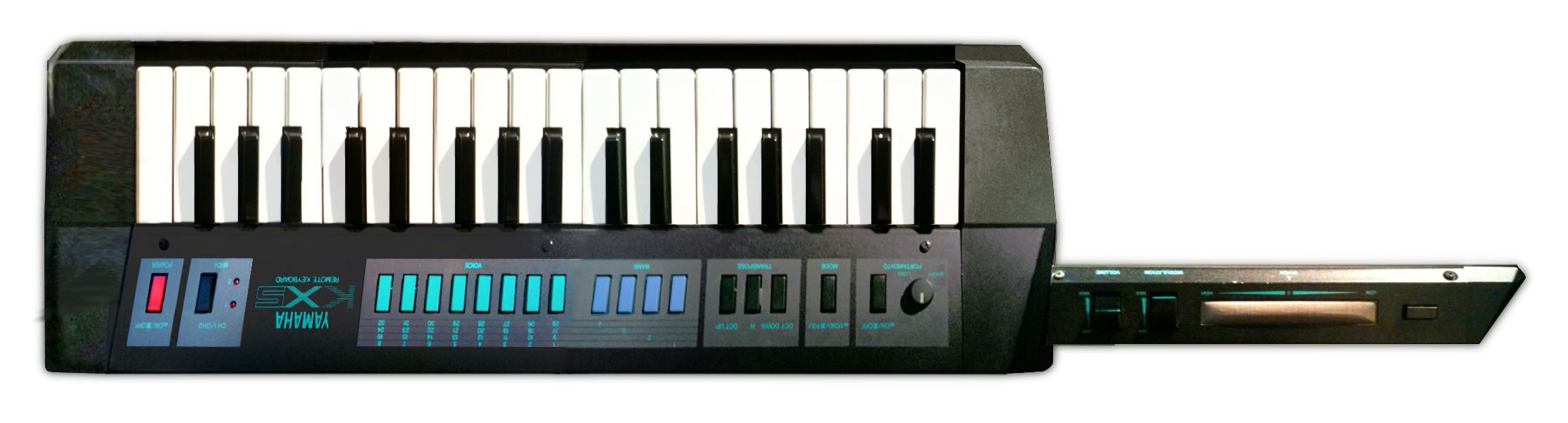
Yamaha KX-5 (1984)

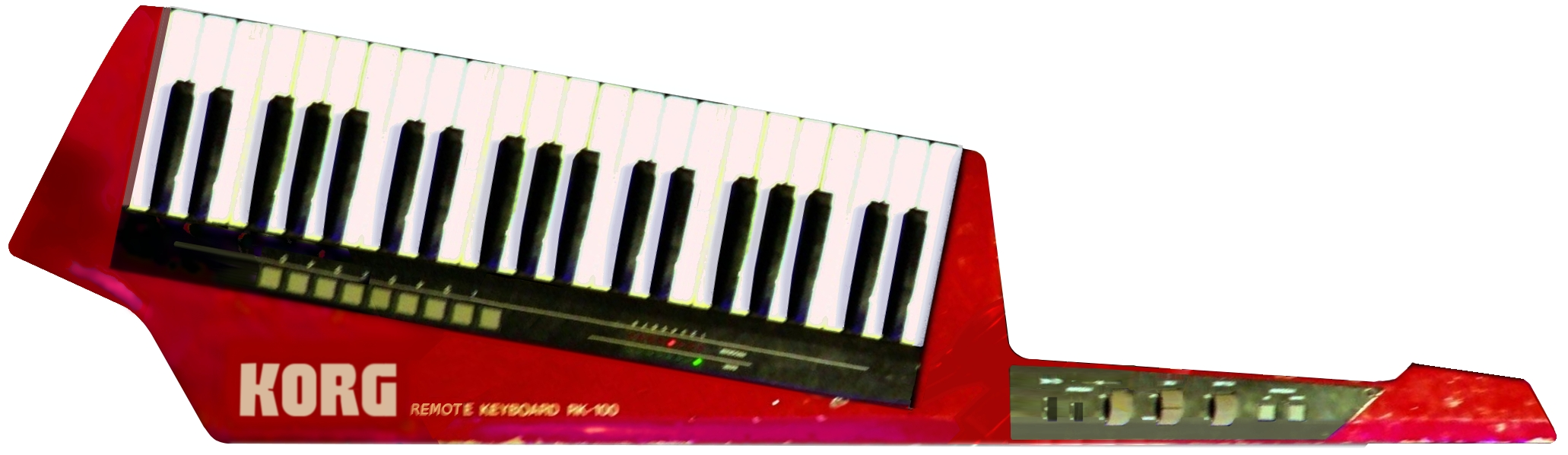
Korg RK-100 (1984)

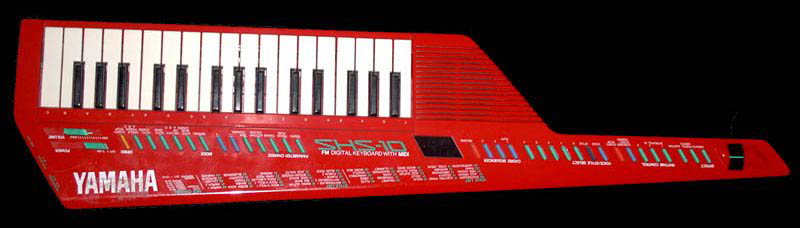
Yamaha SHS-10 (1987)

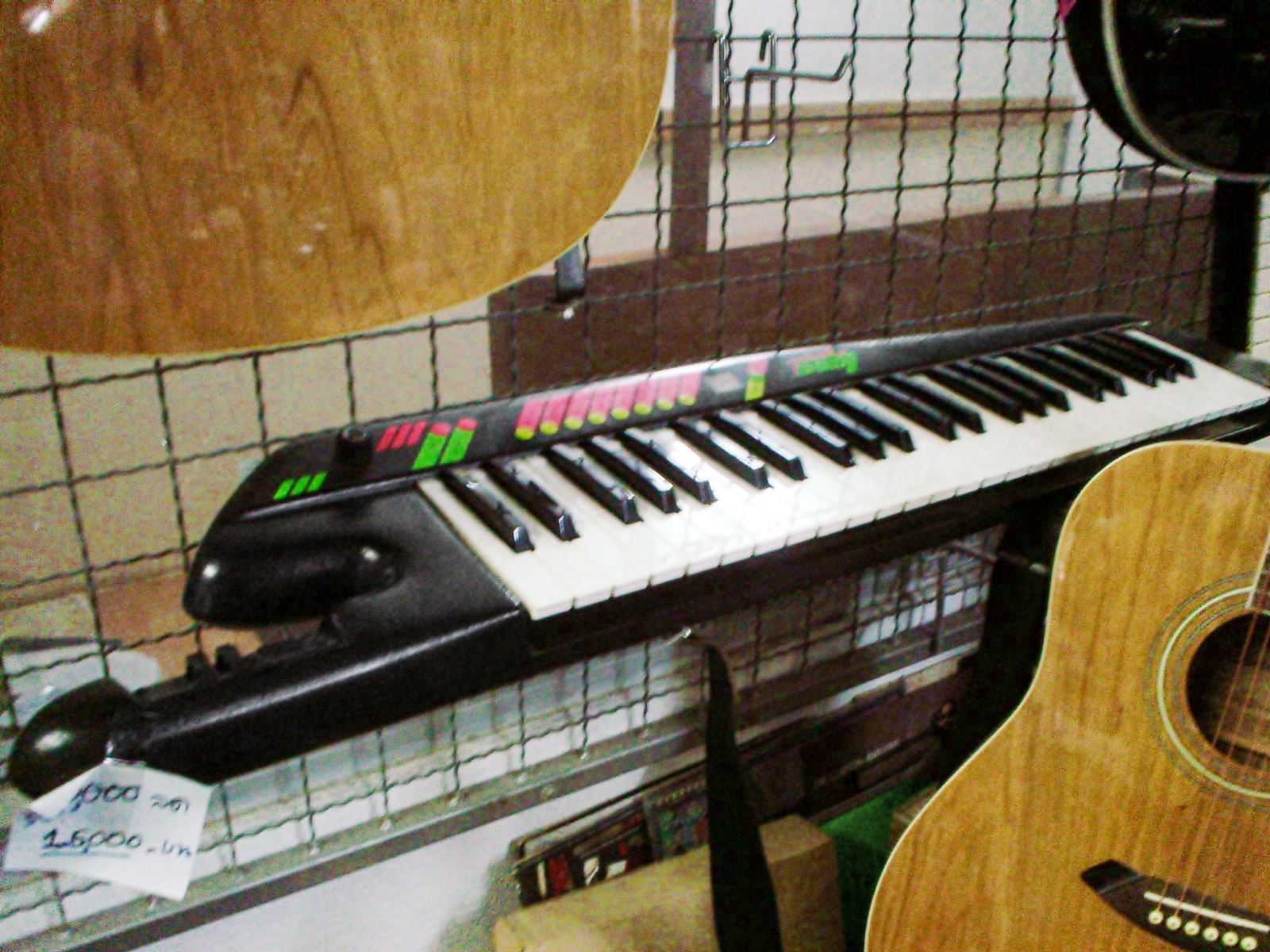
Lync LN-1000 (1990)

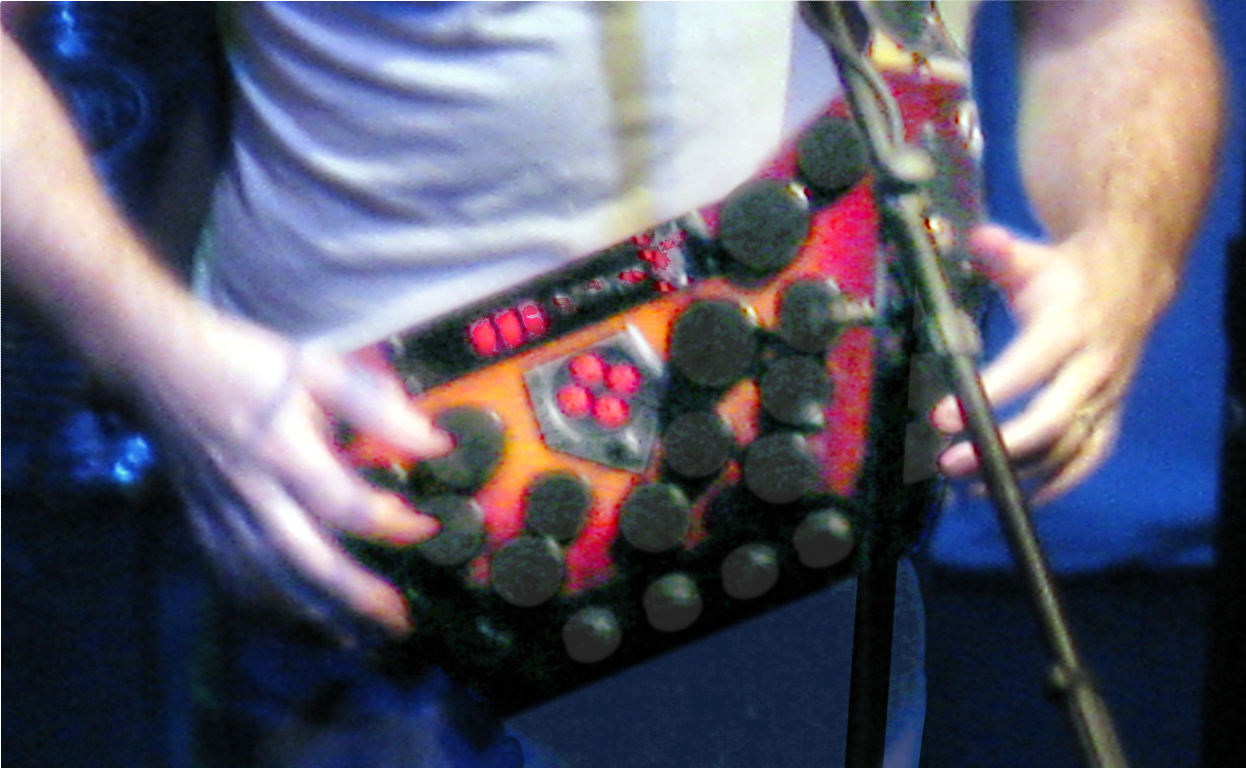
Zendrum series (1994)

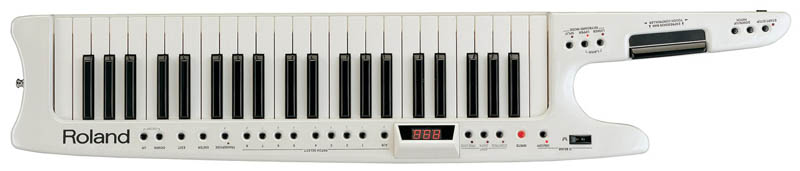
Roland AX-7 (2001)

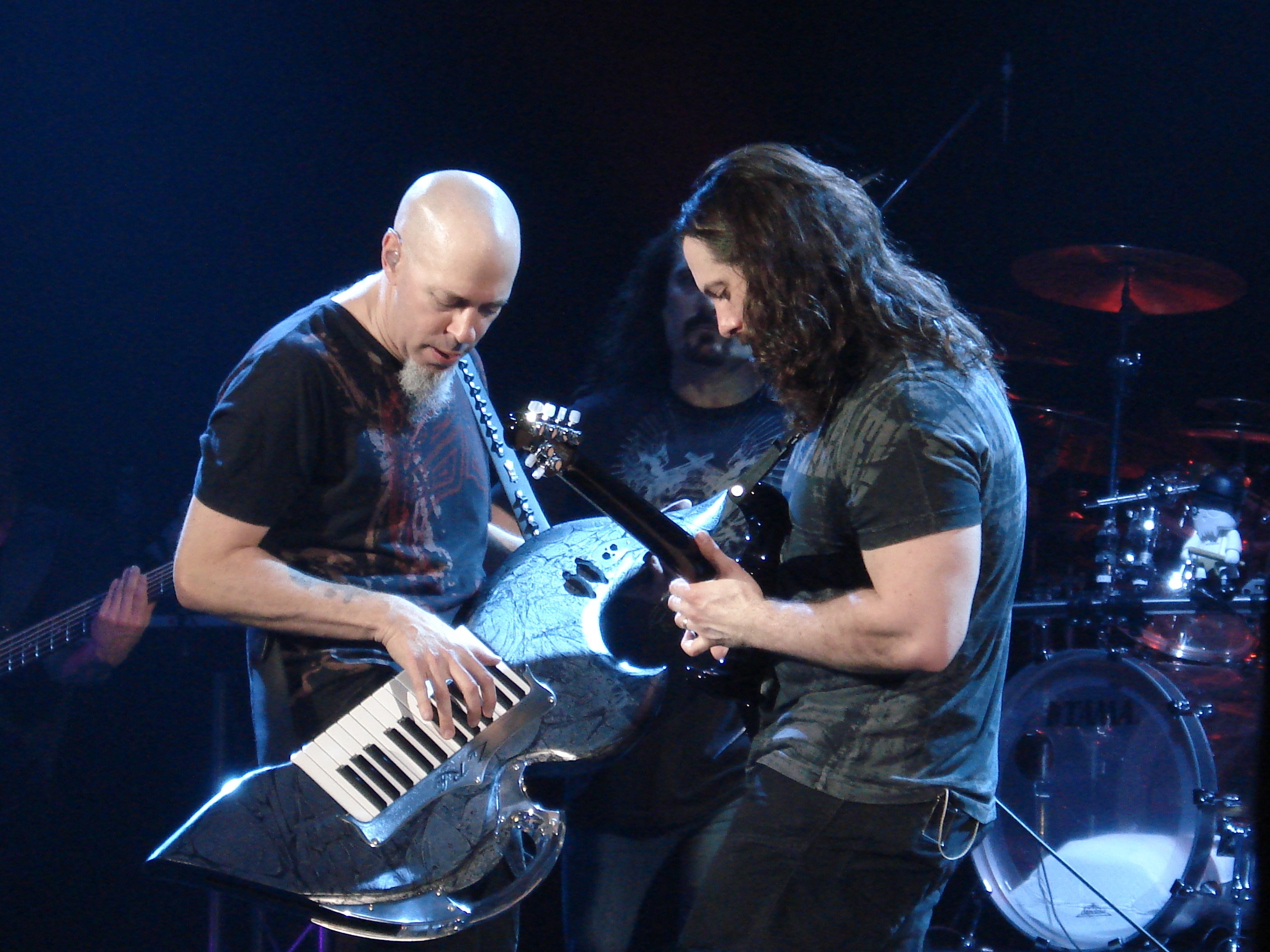
Zen Riffer Solo Axe (2007) by Roy Wooten

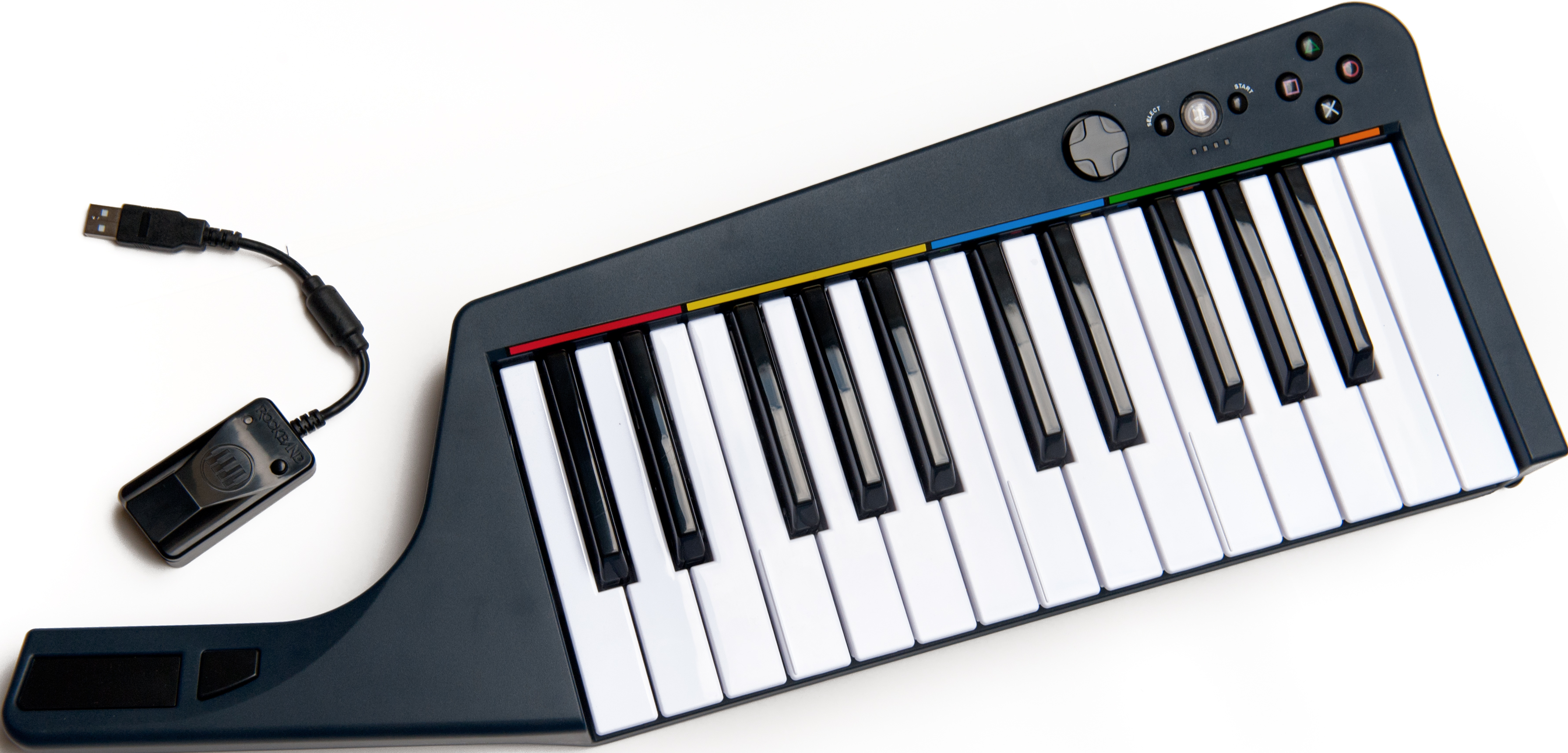
Mad Catz Rock Band 3 Wireless Pro Keyboard

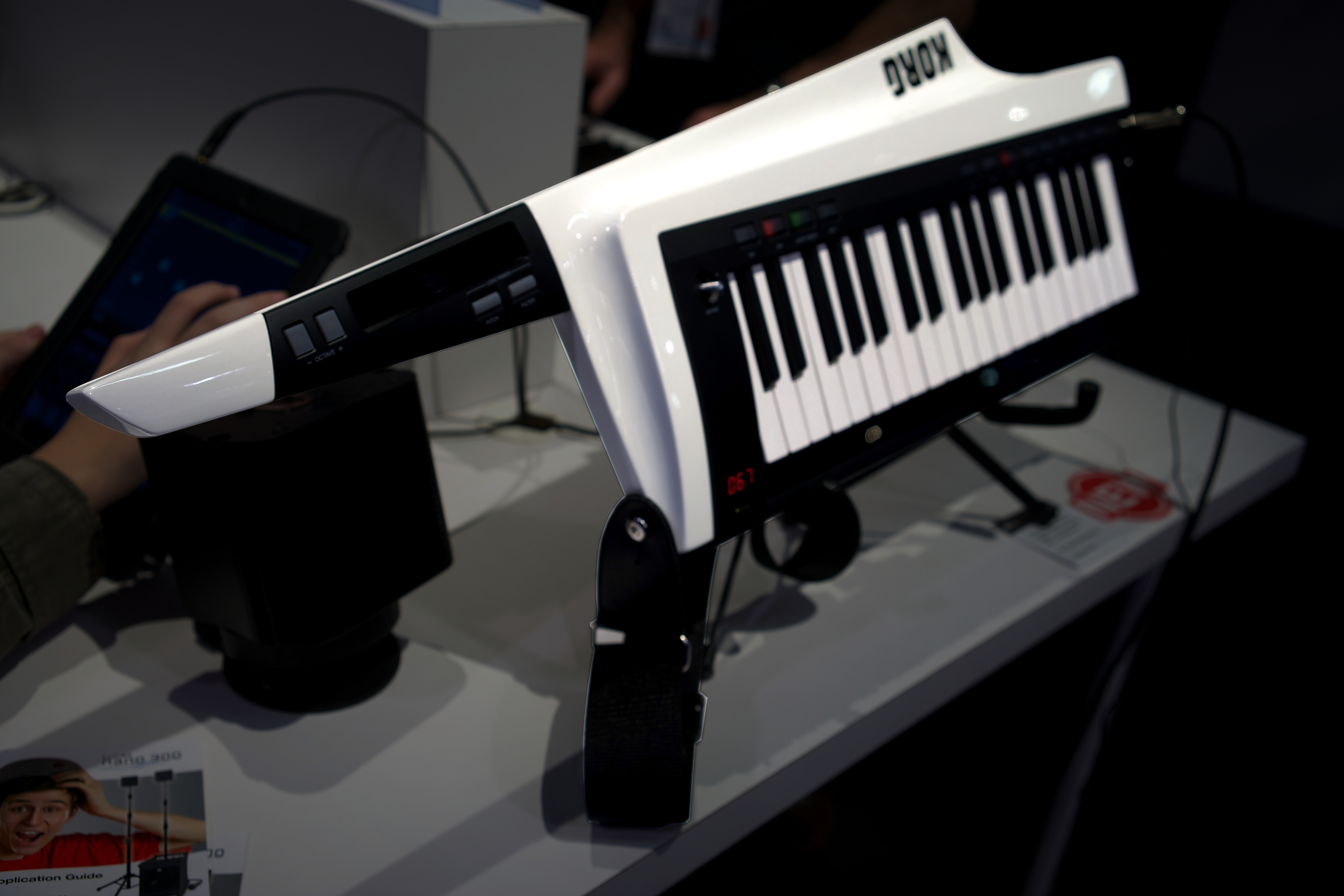
Korg RK-100s (2014)

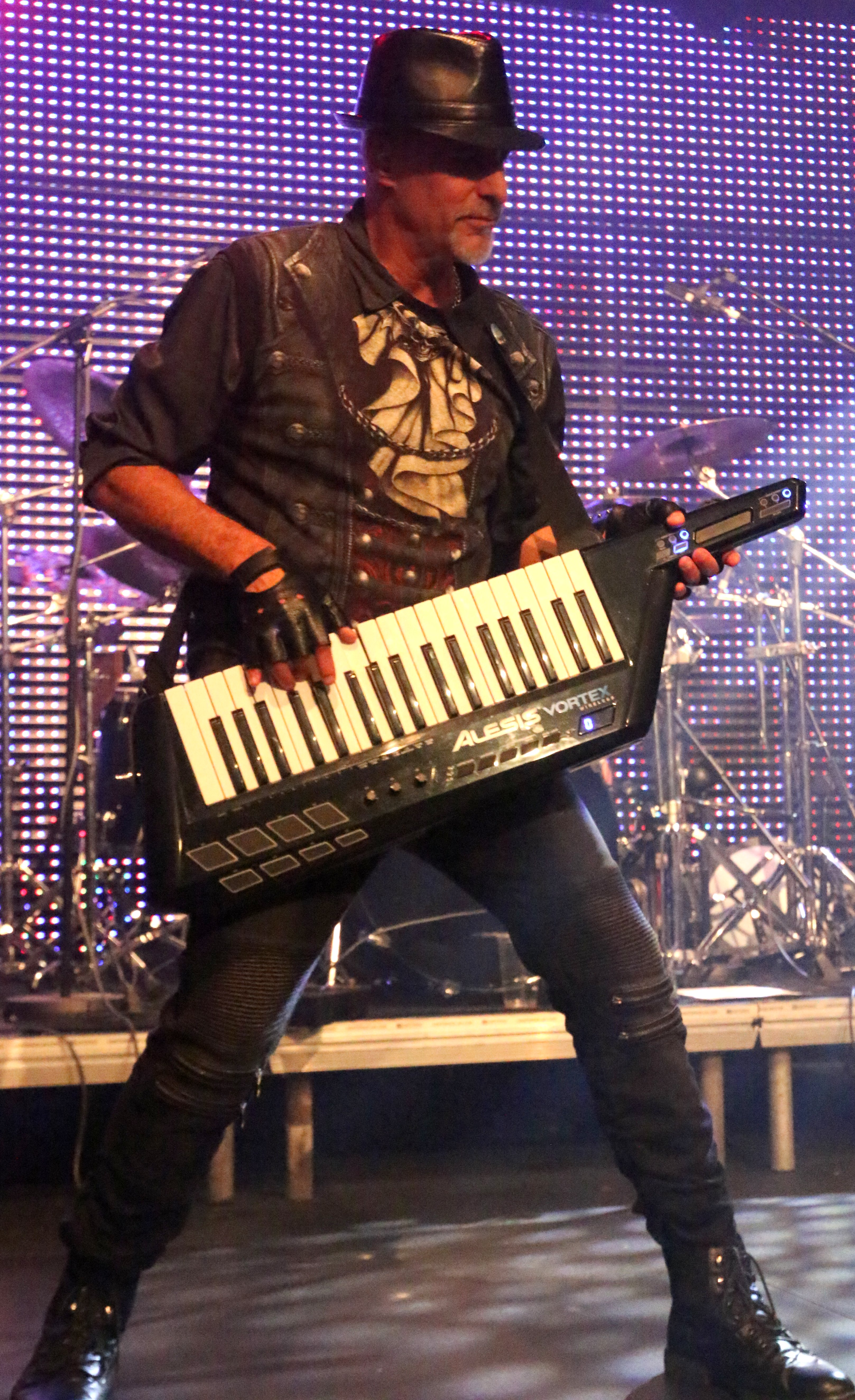
Alesis Vortex Wireless (2014) played by Jean Pageau (Mystery) in 2019

== See also ==
- Keytar
- List of keytarists
