= SIEL =

SIEL may refer to:

- Societa Industrie Elettroniche (SIEL), an Italian company that made electronic organs and synthesizers in the 1980s
- Honda Siel Cars India
- SIEL (Paris Metro), a system that provides the waiting time until the arrival of the next two Paris Metro trains
- Sovereignty, Identity and Freedoms, a French political party
- Standard individual export licence which permits a specific list of goods to be exported to a specific destination.
