= Electronic Music Laboratories =

American synthesizer company

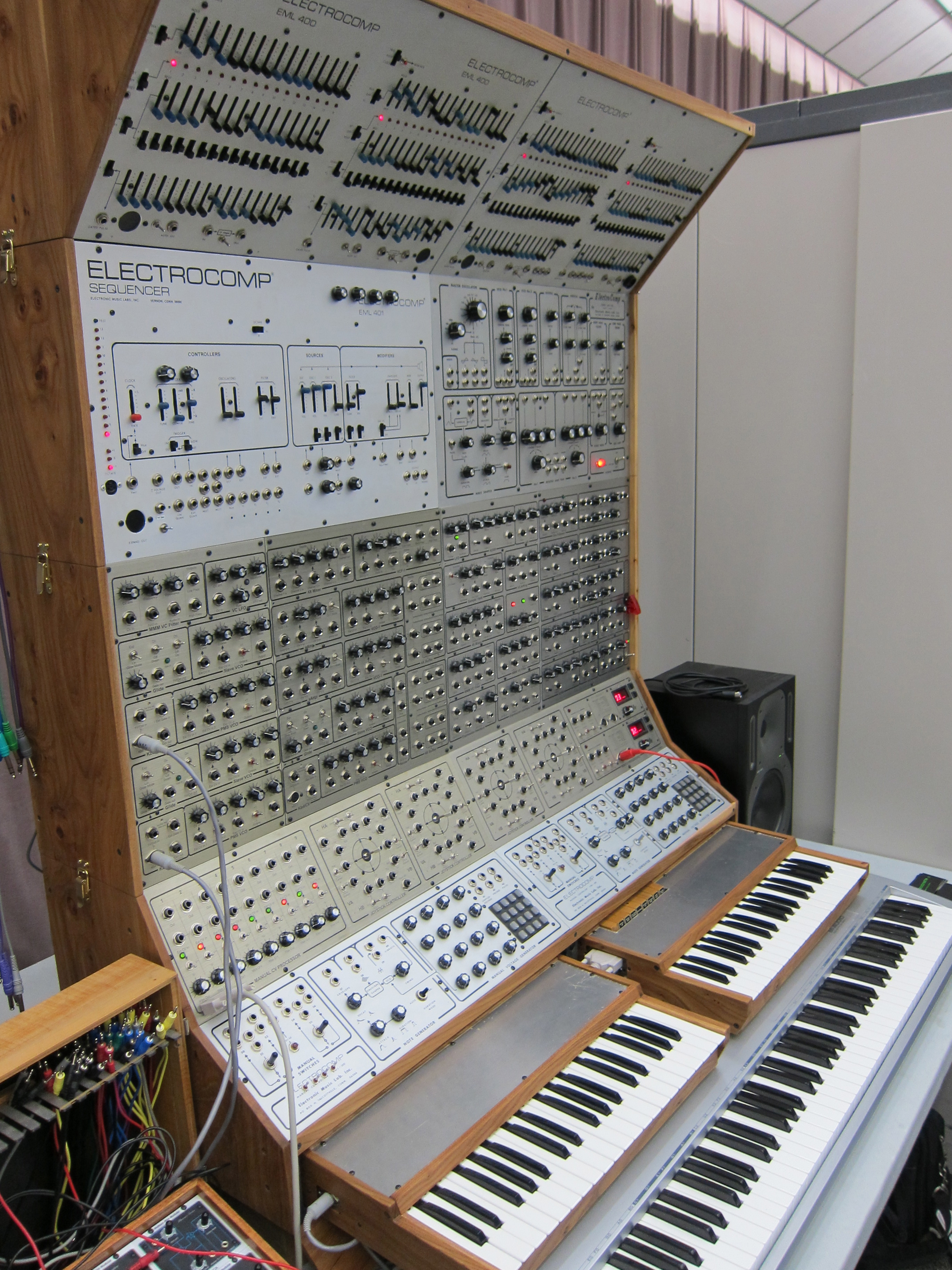
EML ElectroComp modular synthesizer with sequencer. Custom built by George Mattson.: EML 400 analog sequencer ×4; EML 401 & EML-200 expander; George Mattson's modules & MIDI I/F; EML-300 manual controller×2; 37key keyboard ×2 & MIDI keyboard

Electronic Music Laboratories, commonly abbreviated to EML, was a synthesizer company founded in 1968 in Vernon, Connecticut, United States. It manufactured and designed a variety of synthesizers sharing the same basic design principles.

The company was founded by Gerber Scientific employees Dale Blake, Norman Millard, Dennis Daugherty, and Jeff Murray, who were due to be laid off from the company. Following the schematics of a fellow audio engineer, Fred Locke, the four made synthesizers that directly competed with those of Moog and ARP. Although their synthesizers were not as sophisticated as those of their competitors, they were marketed as being much more reliable, in part due to their use of op-amps instead of discrete transistors.

The company's original EML-200 was designed in part for Connecticut's "Pilot Electronic Project" as an educational tool for secondary school students. The program was created by then-State Music Consultant Lloyd Schmidt.

Although the company stopped manufacturing synthesizers in 1976 following the departure of two of their employees to found Star Instruments (makers of the Synare line of drum synthesizers), EML continued to operate until 1984, designing and manufacturing products for others and repairing their synthesizers.

== Products ==
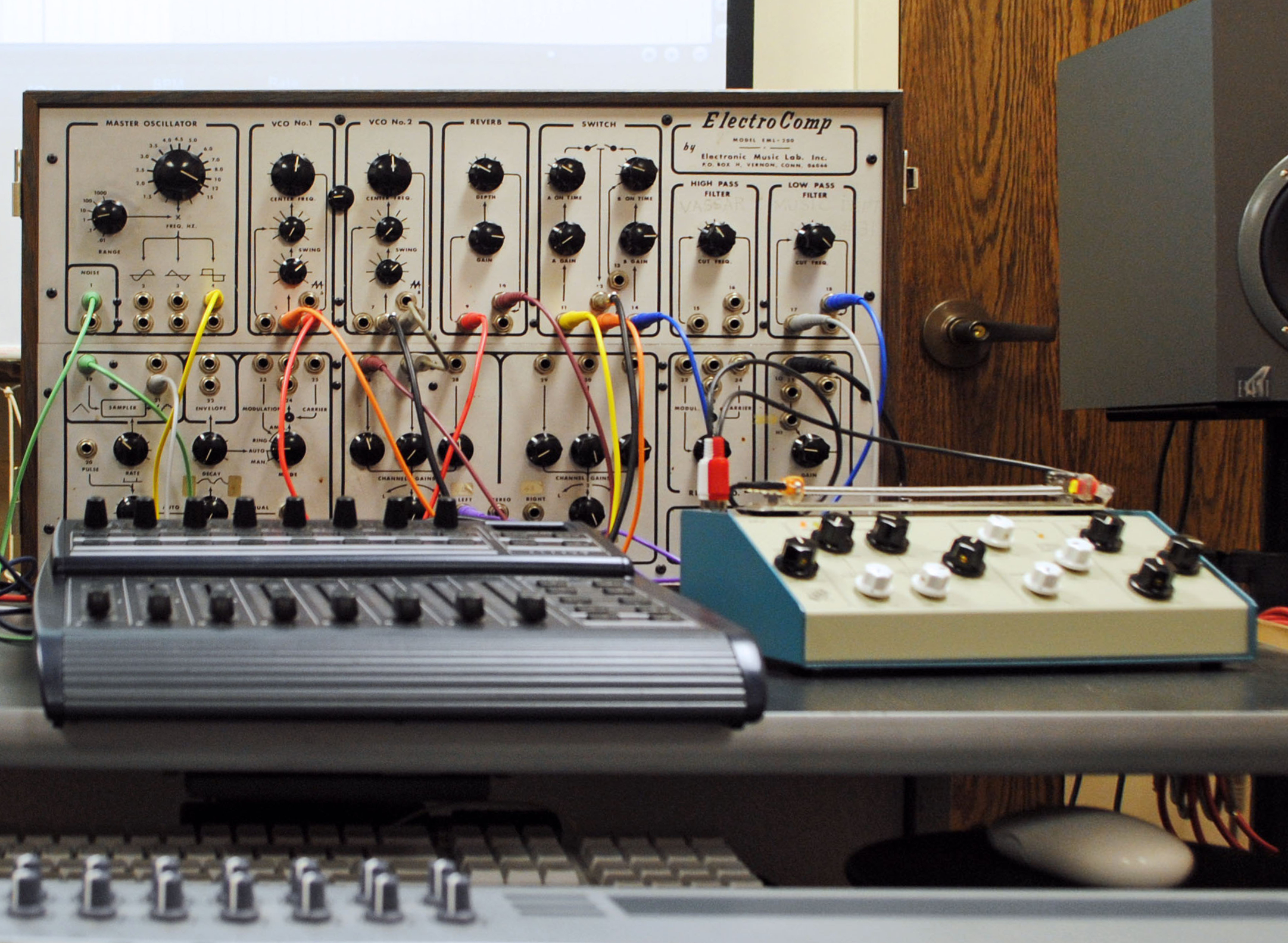
ElectroComp EML-200 on electronic music classroom

- 1969: The ElectroComp 200 - monophonic, modular 2-VCO "expansion" module.
- 1970: The ElectroComp 100 - duophonic. a portable, "suitcase" synthesizer which was produced one year before the better known semi-modular ARP 2600. The ElectroComp 100 was followed by the similar ElectroComp 101.
- 1972: The ElectroComp 101 - duophonic
- The ElectroComp 300 - a "controller" unit initially intended as an option for the EML 200. It consists of a voltage source (with knobs & numeric keys), oscillator, envelope generator, and manual routing switches.
- The ElectroComp 301 - a “controller” unit similar to the 300. The manual routing switches of the 300 were replaced by a joystick, and the synthesizer section gained a low-frequency oscillator and a sample and hold.
- The ElectroComp 400 Sequencer & 401 Synthesizer - a sophisticated portable sequencer and a simple synthesizer. A typical 400 system consisted of a 400 16 step programming panel, a 416 programming panel and a 401 synth module. Innovative features included a voltage quantizer and voltage-controlled envelope generators.
- The ElectroComp 500 - Followed a trend among musicians and manufacturers towards more portable, "performance" synthesizers. Was essentially a 401 with a keyboard. Competed directly with the Minimoog and the ARP Odyssey.
- The PolyBox - a small module designed to add polyphony to monophonic analog synthesizers, featuring a 13-key keyboard. Only around 150 were made.
- The SynKey - EML's last major product, used organ-style divide-down oscillators and interval select buttons to give a basic paraphonic/chord function. Unique in its storage of patches on plastic punched cards. Released in both programmable (2001) and non-programmable (1500) versions.

EML also produced a few custom-built units which used their standard modules in new configurations. ynthesizer modules were also available, giving musicians the ability to build their own modular synthesizers at a lower cost than a Moog, EMS, or ARP. Note that another company, I.W.Turner, produced a series of “Electronic Music Lab” modules which are often mistaken for EML products.
