= Casio AZ-1 =

Keytar model

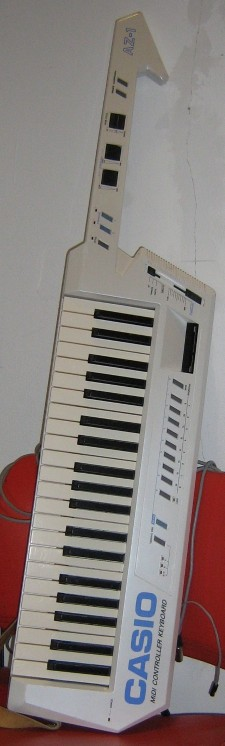

The Casio AZ-1 is a polyphonic MIDI keyboard in the form of a keytar. It has a distinctive white body with a long neck, with detailing in a pale blue. This instrument is designed to be played, with the aid of a shoulder strap, in an approximation of an electric guitar. As were many keytars, it was geared towards keyboardists who wanted greater freedom of movement during performances.

== Features ==
The AZ-1 features 2 switches, 2 wheels, and 1 slider that transmit assignable MIDI continuous controller data as the user deems fit. It has a pitch wheel for shifting the sound up or down fractions of a note. Other non-definable controllers include Solo, Sustain, Portamento and a three position octave slider. The AZ-1 has one MIDI output, and can simultaneously transmit on two selectable midi channels. It can send midi program change commands from dedicated program select buttons. Furthermore, its feature set includes both velocity sensitivity as well as true aftertouch. This is something of a rarity amongst keytars, and all but the highest end keyboards, as many only have velocity sensitivity. The AZ-1 is powered by either 6 AA batteries (1.5v each) or by external power supply (negative center pin, positive ring.)

== History ==
=== 1980s–1990s ===
The keyboard featured in the music video "House Arrest" by Krush.

In 1996, it was used by Dean Bright (from Dead or Alive) in all tours, like in London Europride '96.

=== 2000s–present ===
Today, the AZ-1 is used by groups such as Magdalena Bay. Furthermore, this model was prominently featured in the music video for Snoop Dogg's "Sensual Seduction".
