= George Mattson (synthesizer inventor) =

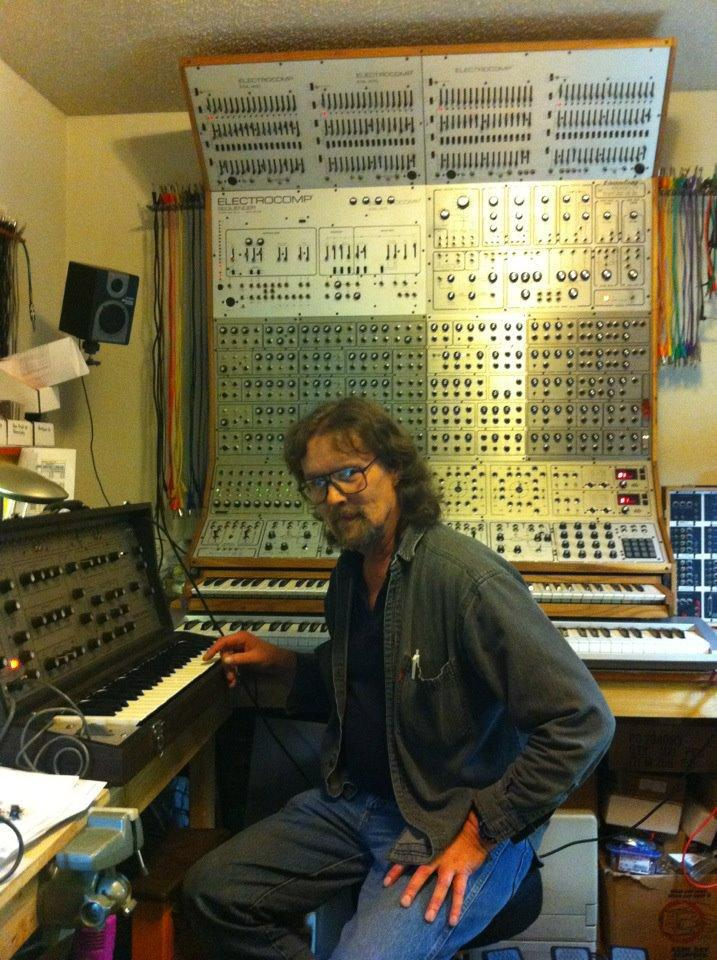
- George Mattson in his lab, 2011
- Born: October 1954 (age 71)
- Known for: Inventor of the first "keytar", the Syntar

George Mattson (born October 1954) is an American inventor, and is an early pioneer in electronic music synthesizer technology. He is credited with the invention of the Syntar, the first fully self-contained "keytar", in 1978, and is founder and owner of Mattson Mini Modular. Mattson lives in the Seattle area.

== Early life ==
Mattson was born in 1954 in Salt Lake City, Utah. In 1964, following the Great Alaskan earthquake, Mattson's father, a geologist, took a job in Anchorage, and relocated the family. It was around this time that Mattson became interested in music, and began learning to play flamenco and classical-style guitar.

Mattson’s father got his sons involved with the local ham radio organization, and in May 1967, Mattson received his ham radio license, making him the youngest amateur radio operator in the nation at the time. The ham radio courses gave him his early background in electronics.

In 1968, Mattson overheard his older brother and father discussing the electronic synthesizer, a device that "could create sounds similar to conventional instruments, imitate environmental sounds, and create sounds never heard before." Mattson was excited by this idea, and vowed to get his hands on one.

In fall of 1973, Mattson moved to Moscow, Idaho to attend the Idaho School of Mines at the University of Idaho, studying mining and metallurgy. He scraped up enough money to buy his first synthesizer, an EML-200, and an EML-101 keyboard manufactured by Electronic Music Laboratories. They arrived in November. Mattson, extremely focused, began his audio experimentations. Consequently, he flunked his first semester of college.

== The Syntar ==
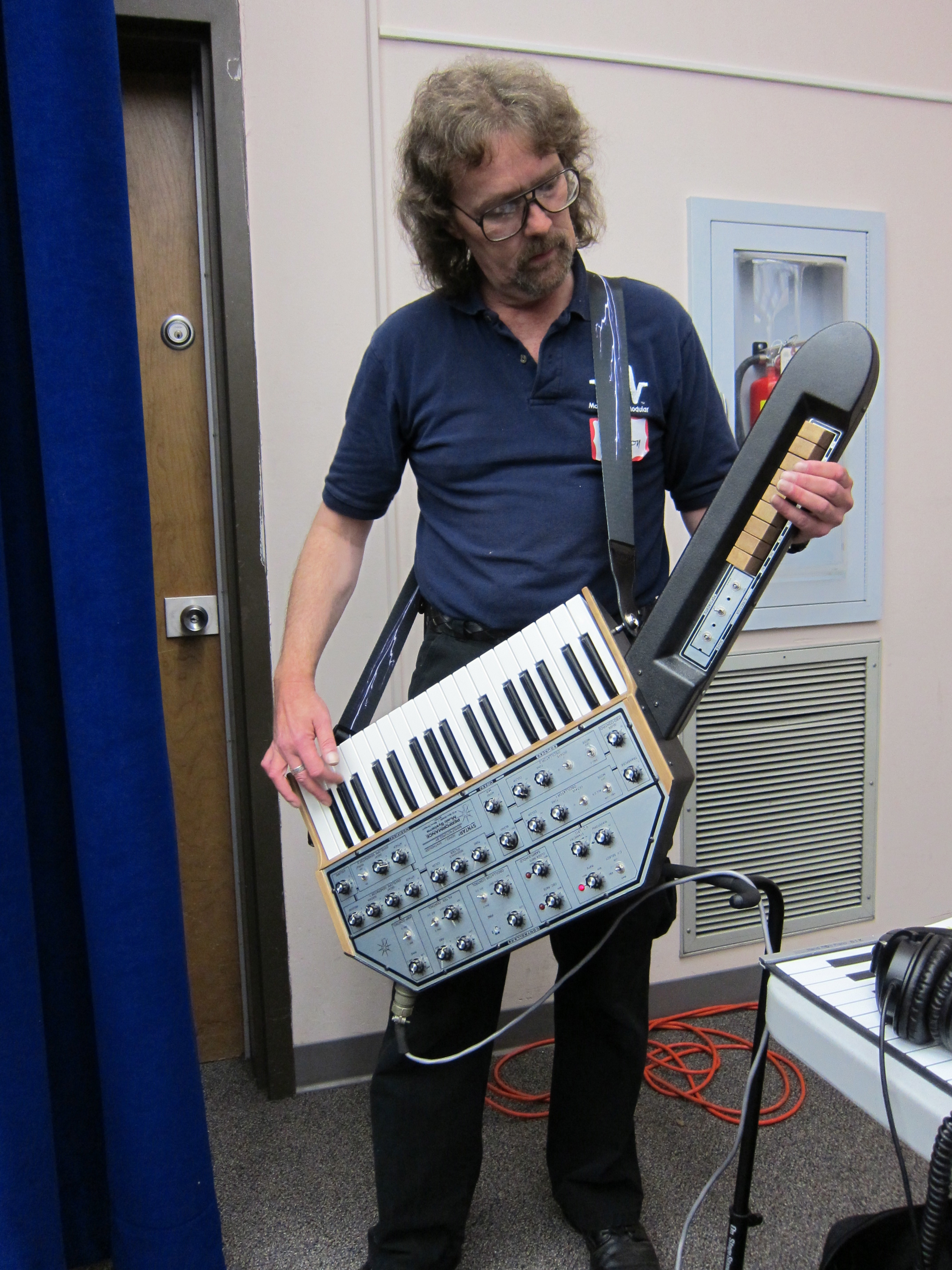
PMS Syntar with George Mattson, at Pacific Northwest Synthfest 2011

Mattson's older brother soon joined him, and they set up a recording studio to write and record music for the commercial market. Mattson's synthesizer collection was growing, and had begun to take up a lot of space. Regarding his revelation that inspired the Syntar: "Oct. 04, 1978, I was alone in the room running back and forth between the consoles and the keyboards when I said to myself, 'What I need is....' and the concept of the Syntar hit me. Then I thought, 'Somebody should make one of these.' Then I thought, 'Hey, I could do this!'"

Mattson relocated to Bend, Oregon, and moved in with his mother and step-father, where he hand-built the Syntar prototype from EML circuit modules. In 1979, he took the prototype to the NAMM Show in Atlanta. His idea was to find a company that would build the Syntar, and hire him as the team leader. A Sales and Marketing consultant for Moog Music and board member of Norlin Corporation (owner of Moog Music and Gibson Guitars at the time) showed interest, and told Mattson he would speak to the Board of Directors and get back with him.

In January 1980, Mattson went to the NAMM show in Anaheim, where he walked by the Moog booth, only to see a non-working prototype of the Moog Liberation "keytar" hanging on a mannequin. Mattson returned home, resolved to produce the Syntar first. He decided to release the Syntar under his own leadership with his new company name, Performance Music Systems.

A month before the Moog Liberation was advertised, Mattson purchased ad space in Up Beat trade magazine touting the Syntar. However, Moog was better financed, and the Liberation became the first mass-produced "keytar".

== Between Syntar and Mattson Mini Modular ==
Mattson had heard Jefferson Starship was looking for a keyboard technician. He called them up and was hired as one of their road crew members. He toured with them for two years. Starship wanted him to move to San Francisco, but Mattson had a family by then. He felt California was not where he wished to raise his family, so in 1983 he relocated to the Seattle area.

In 1988, Mattson graduated from ITT Tech as class valedictorian, with an associate degree in Electronics Engineering. Just before graduation, he was hired as an equipment engineer in the semiconductor industry. Over the next 18 years, Mattson worked several electronics-industry jobs, each one leading to lay-offs due to closures.

== Mattson Mini Modular ==
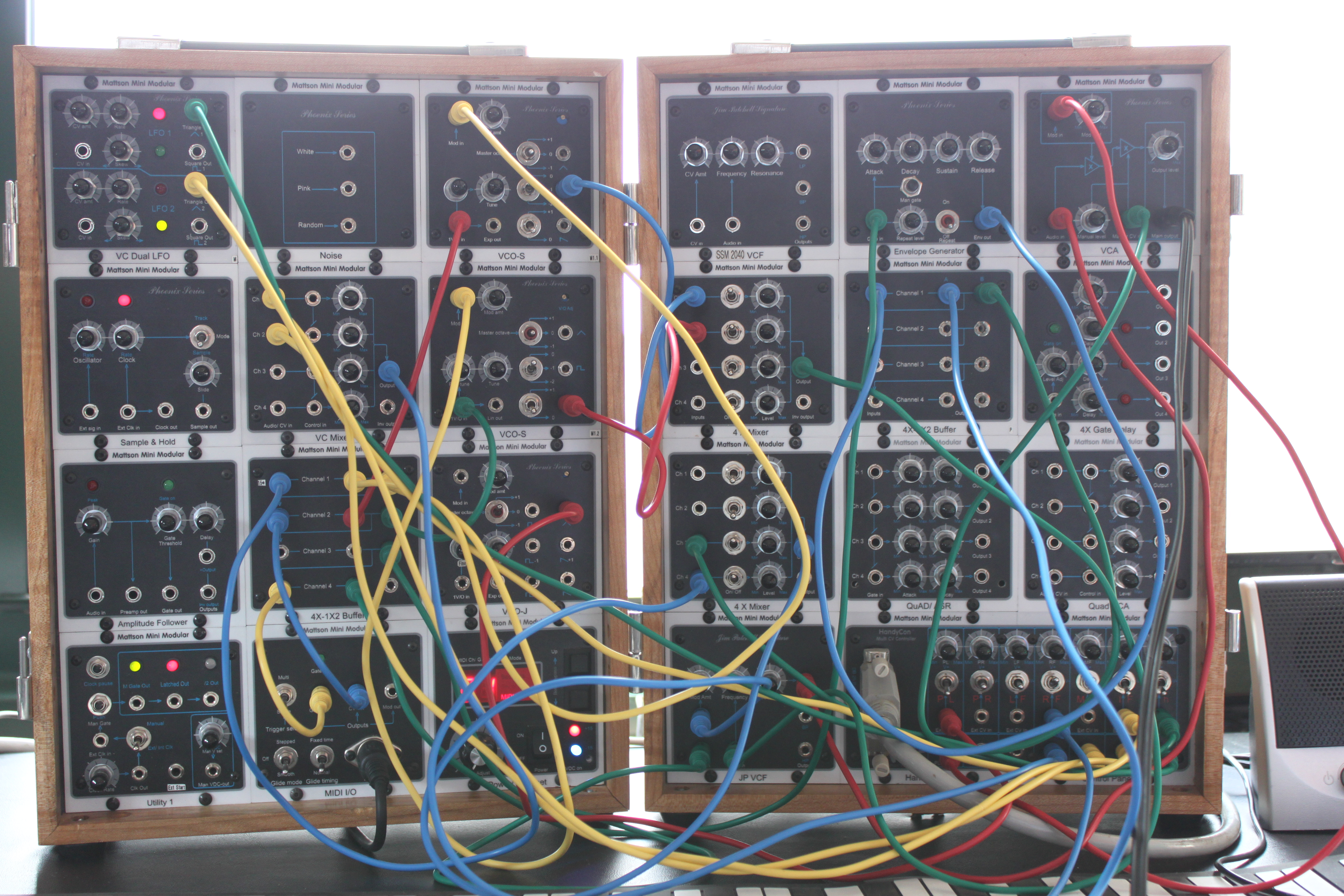
Mattson Mini Modular at Trash Audio-Xart Synth Event 9

In 2006 Mattson found himself unemployed again. He still had components of the Syntar that he'd kept through the years, and he discovered that a new generation of musicians was interested in analog synthesizers – there was a fresh market for his creation. He decided to see if he could sell a few to generate some revenue.

The idea for the Mattson Mini Modular began as a challenge: In April 2007, Mattson was on the phone with Matrixsynth blogger Matrix, offering to build him a Syntar. Matrix told Mattson that he had enough keyboard synthesizers, and was now in the market for a modular system. He wanted Mattson's opinion on which brand he would recommend. Mattson said he would rather build his own. Matrix replied, "Well...why don’t you?" Mattson didn't have an answer, other than, "Well...why not?"

Mattson made size and portability a priority for his new product. He worked on the design and build of the first Mattson Mini Modular system for six months before introducing it to the world on September 15, 2007.

== Ichabod ==
Billy Corgan of The Smashing Pumpkins had seen a video on YouTube that featured a stack of eight Mattson Mini Modular systems. He contacted Mattson, and over the course of a few weeks, they worked out the details of a very large system.

Ichabod is a one-of-a-kind synthesizer. The case was hand made from African Padauk, measuring six feet across and four feet high, with the capacity to contain 192 modules. It was delivered to Corgan in September 2009.
