= Siel Orchestra =

Analog synthesizer

Quartet
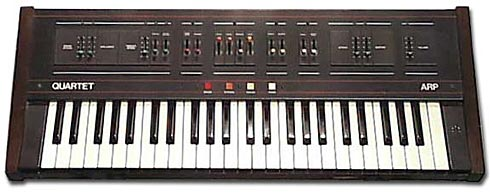
- ARP Quartet
- Manufacturer: ARP Instruments, Inc.
- Dates: 1979 - 1980

Technical specifications
- Polyphony: 49
- Timbrality: 1-2
- Oscillator: 1-2 of 4
- LFO: 1
- Synthesis type: Analog Subtractive
- Filter: 4-pole
- Attenuator: AS (brass & string)
- Storage memory: 4

Input/output
- Keyboard: 49-key
- Left-hand control: none
- External control: none

The Siel Orchestra is an analogue subtractive synthesizer, which was produced by Italian manufacturer Siel from 1979 to 1982. The original Orchestra was very limited but still a very characteristic instrument for its time. It produces its sounds from a divide-down oscillator network and therefore has 49-note (unlimited) polyphony. Although it contains 4 sections of presets (Brass, Strings, Reed and Piano), which each contain two sounds, the only parameters that can be edited are Vibrato (LFO), Brilliance (for the Brass, which also has a separate 'Brass Attack'), Attack and Decay. This ultimately means that the Orchestra cannot produce many different sounds; however because of its Italian origin and its distinctive routing, the Orchestra sound is not matched by any other similar synthesizers.

The Orchestra was later bought by ARP Instruments to be slightly modified, relabeled and then sold as the ARP Quartet. This version replaced the Reed section with an Organ one; however, aside from that the synthesizer was almost identical.

The Orchestra does not support MIDI or any other means of communicating with other electronic instruments; however, it does include a volume pedal socket which could be mistaken for a MIDI port.

== Orchestra 2 ==
SIEL Orchestra 2 internals

Later, a more programmable version of the Orchestra was released. It still used 4 preset sections; however, it offered many improvements over the original version. A better filter for the brass section was included and more sounds were added to other sections. It also introduced a very simple LFO, a graphic equalizer, octave transposition and an 'animator section' which was effectively a flange effect. It also had a pitch bend function which was surprisingly never included with the first version Orchestra.
