= Siel DK70 =

Synthesizer by Siel

DK70
- Manufacturer: Siel
- Dates: 1986-1990

Technical specifications
- Polyphony: 8 voice
- Timbrality: Monotimbral
- Oscillator: 8 DCOs with square and sawtooth waveforms (not independently configurable).
- LFO: 2 LFO
- Synthesis type: Paraphonic Subtractive
- Filter: 1 resonant 4 pole VCF
- Attenuator: 2 ADSR envelope, triggered by gate or LFO
- Storage memory: 2 track Polyphonic sequencer
- Effects: Chorus

Input/output
- Keyboard: 49-note
- Left-hand control: Optional "stage set" Keytar grip that allows for pitch bend, program change and modulation
- External control: MIDI

The Siel DK70 is a synthesizer produced in 1986 by Siel.

== Description ==
The DK70 is the cut-down little brother of the Siel DK80. It is often compared to the Korg Poly-800, to which it is conceptually similar, but while is had a similar appearance and used a very similar digital interface (even "sharing" the extended envelope parameters of break-point and slope) it is no clone. It operates like an analog synth, but its envelope generators and LFOs are all digital and its oscillators use a digitally-controlled divide-down organ chip. The DK-70 has eight "oscillators", but all the voices are mixed together through a single "monophonic" analog lowpass filter which was shared for all voices. Similar "paraphonic" arrangements were used in instruments like the ARP Omni. While the DK70 offers similar features and settings to the Korg Poly 800, it appeared several years later, has a different chipset and sound and offers additional features like two LFOs, memory cartridges and accepts velocity response over MIDI.

Like a monophonic synthesizer, the filter was switchable between single or multiple modes. In single mode, the first key pressed triggers the filter envelope, and unless all keys are released, the filter does not re-trigger. In multi mode, each key pressed in turn triggers the filter envelope, even if other keys are still pressed down.

The oscillators are called "DCOs", and the envelope generators called DEG (for Digital Envelope Generator). Digital components were much cheaper at the time and using digital access and control, an (SGS M112) organ chip and a single (SSM2045) VCF, the DK70 could approximate the sound of an analog synth, but have 8 note polyphony without being cost prohibitive to the average user.

An unusual feature of the DK70 is that, while it appears to have the form factor of a standard synth, it has guitar strap pegs and can be used as a keytar. (The Poly-800 also had this feature.) An accessory called the "Stage Set" can be attached to the left side to provide a grip (similar to that of the SH-101), where the player may manipulate a ribbon-style pitch bender, as well as have access to buttons that change patches, change octaves and engage the LFO modulation.

It stores 50 patches, 10 of which are user assignable. A cartridge port accepted a cartridge which could store an additional 50 patches. All programming is done via pushbuttons, somewhat limiting its "tweakability" for live performances.

It also has an onboard two-track sequencer, which can be programmed by setting the tempo and recording a performance (unlike a step sequencer, where notes were entered in sequential order and played back at fixed durations). The performance would then loop when played back.

The synth engine was also available in the earlier keyboardless, table top Siel Expander-80 (actually a cut-down DK-80), similar to the Korg EX-800. Released in Brazil as Giannini GS 7010 polyphonic synthesizer
