= Siel =

Italian company that made electronic organs and synthesizers

Societa Industrie Elettroniche
- Trade name: SIEL
- Headquarters: Italy

Societa Industrie Elettroniche (SIEL) was an Italian company that made electronic organs and synthesizers in the 1980s.

== Timeline of major products ==
- 1979 - Orchestra (Divide down oscillator network for full poly. Brass/string/key/organ. ARP relabelled it the "Quartet" in the US as they were folding.)
- 1980 - Mono (A fairly nice sounding simple 1 DCO, 1 VCF monosynth)
- 1981 - Cruise (Combination of “Mono“ and “Orchestra“ in one Synthesizer
- 1982 - OR400 / Orchestra 2 (Improvement of Orchestra above. More parameter sliders. This was also marketed by Sequential Circuits as the Prelude.)
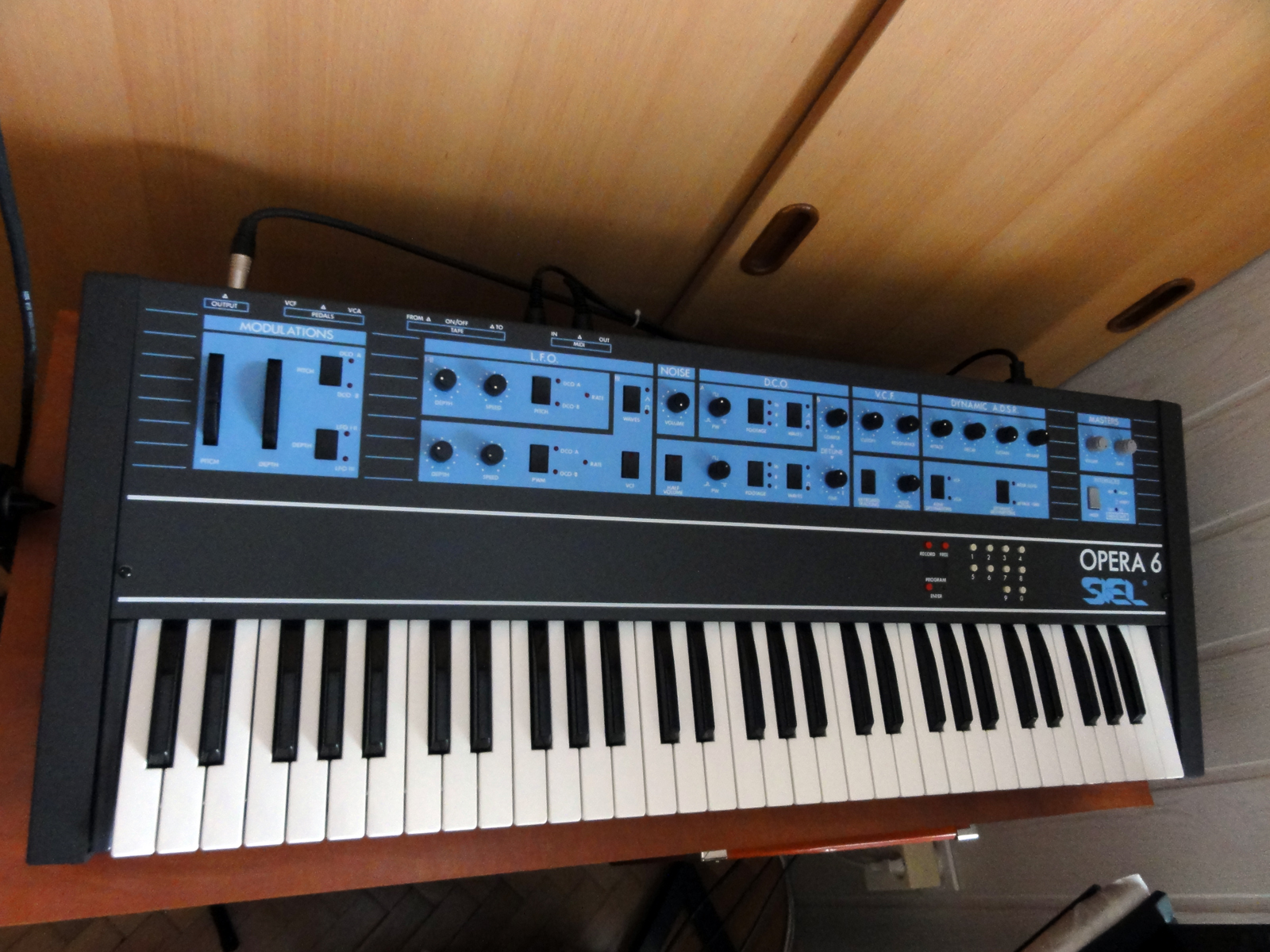
  Opera 6 (1984)
- 1984 - Opera 6 (2 DCO divide down from HFO ssm2031 chips, with all analog signal/EG)
- 1984 - DK600 (Opera 6 with different artwork. The last EPROM supports MIDI channels/Omni off)
- 1984 - Expander (opera 6/DK600 in a table top module. Only dco B tune, Volume, master tune.)
- 1985 - DK80 (splittable/layerable dual 6 voice synth with one M112B1 tone and one SSM2045 VCF per half.)
- 1985 - Expander 80 (DK80 module)
- 1985 - DK70 (One half of DK80 utilizing 8DCO in either single or 2DCO/4 voice.) This was also marketed by Giannini as GS 7010
- 1985 - CMK 49 (Commodore 64 keyboard)
- 1986 - DK700 (Enhanced DK600 with digital editing instead of knobs.)

== See also ==
- List of Italian Companies
