= Keytar =

Electronic keyboard supported by a strap around shoulders like a guitar

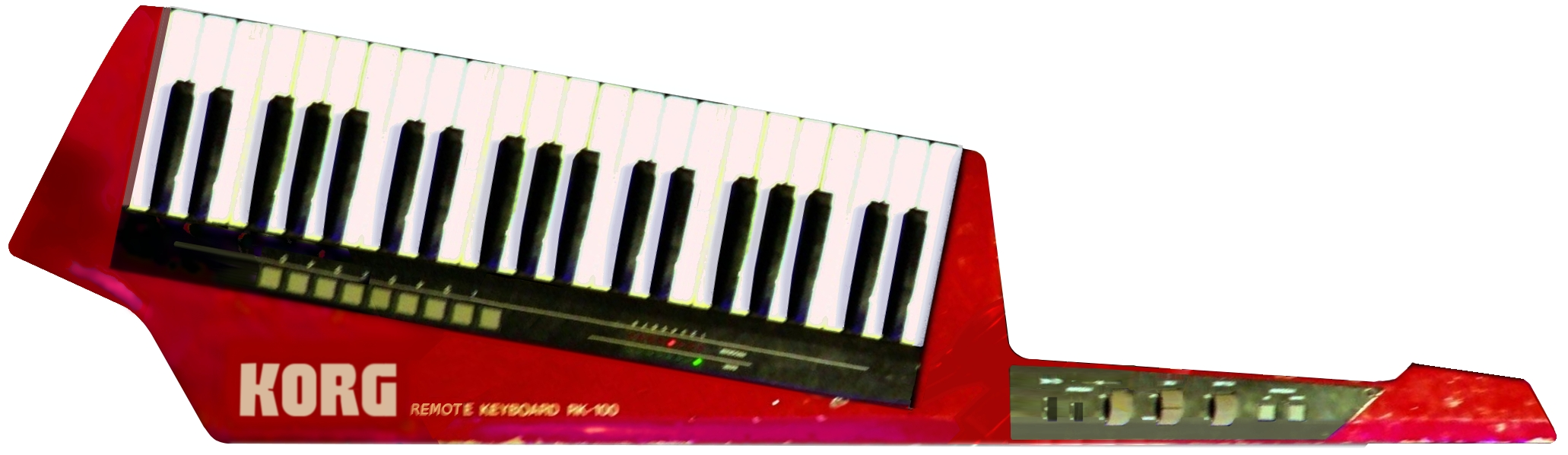
KORG RK-100 (1984) MIDI remote controller

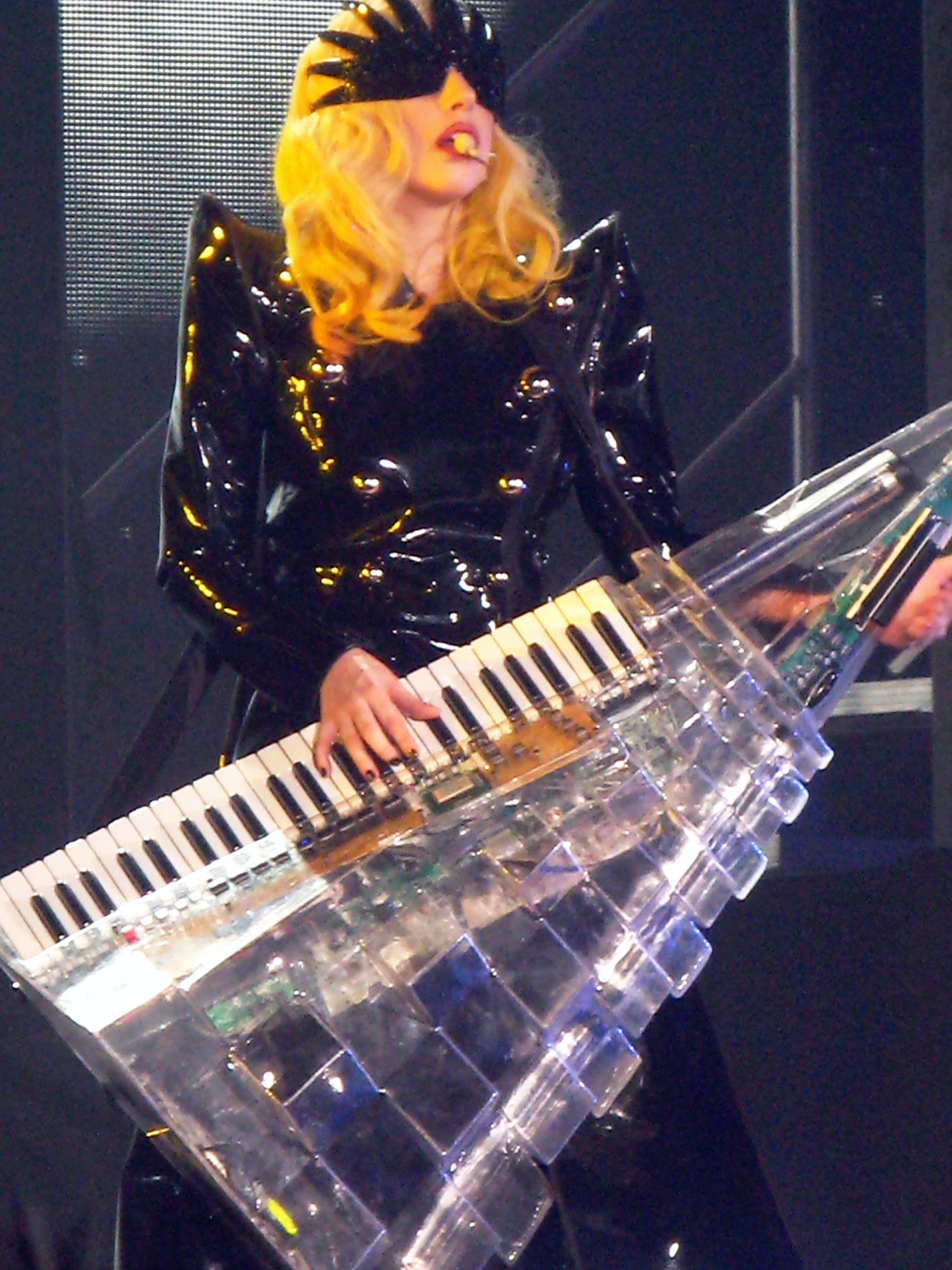
Lady Gaga playing a custom-made keytar during The Monster Ball Tour in 2010

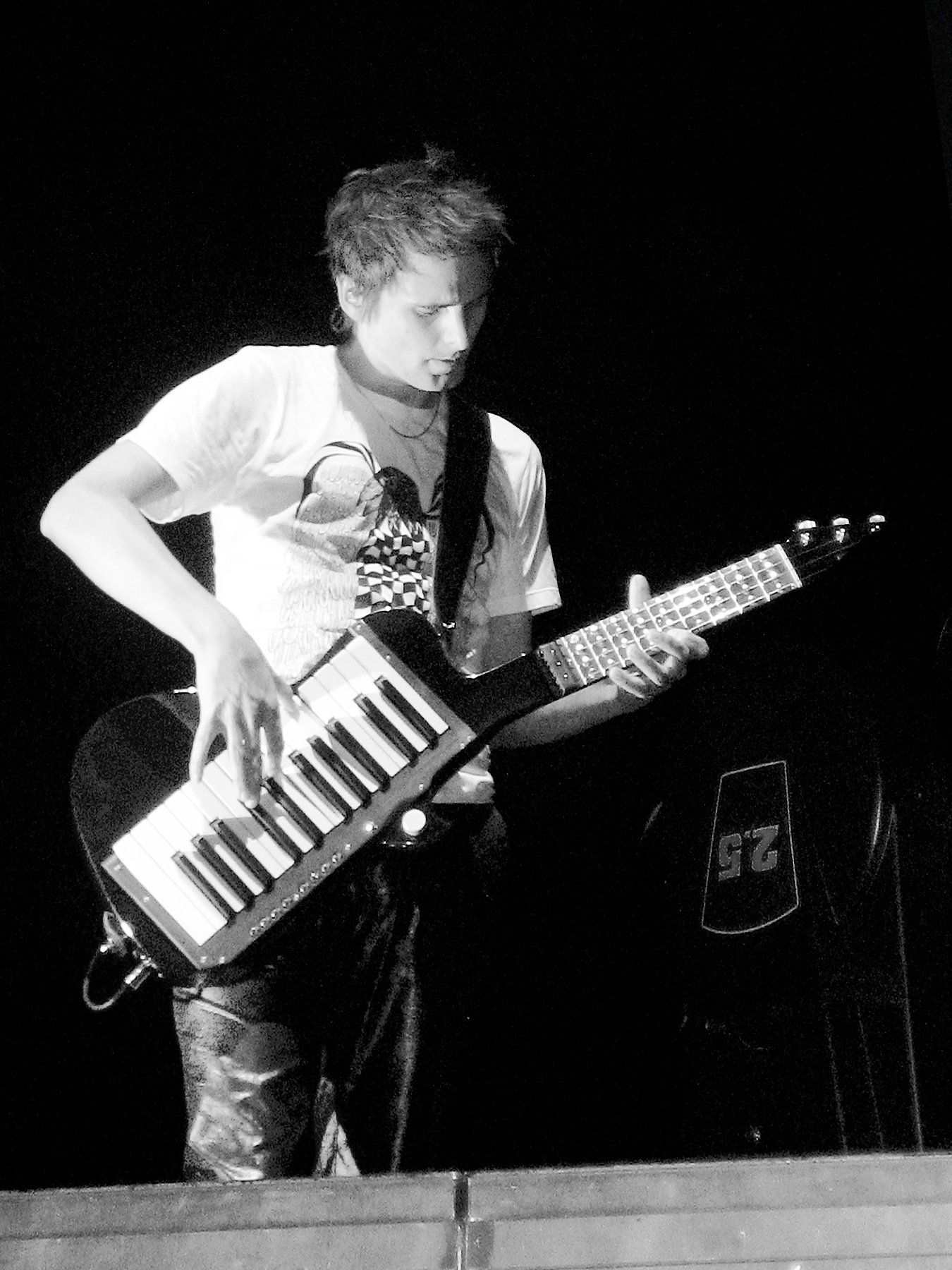
Matt Bellamy of Muse during The Resistance Tour in 2010

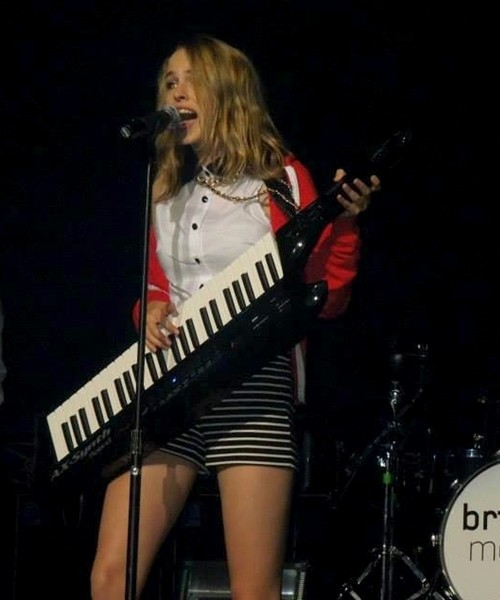
Bridgit Mendler during Summer Tour in 2013

A keytar (a portmanteau of keyboard and guitar) is a keyboard instrument similar to a synthesizer or MIDI controller that is supported by a strap around the neck and shoulders, similar to the way a guitar is held.

== Overview ==
Though the term "keytar" has been used since the introduction of the instrument, it was not used by a major manufacturer until 2012, when the Alesis company referred to the "Vortex", the company's first product of this type, as a "USB/MIDI Keytar Controller”.

Keytars allow players a greater range of movement onstage, compared to conventional keyboards, which are placed on stationary stands or which are part of heavy, floor-mounted structures. The instrument has a musical keyboard for triggering musical notes and sounds. Various controls are placed on the instrument's "neck", including those for pitch bends, vibrato, portamento, and sustain.

Keytars may either contain their own synthesizer engines, or function as MIDI controllers. In either case, a keytar needs to be connected to a keyboard amplifier or PA system to produce a sound that the performer and audience can hear. MIDI controller keytars trigger notes and other MIDI data on an external MIDI-capable synthesizer, sound module or computer with synthesizer software. While a keytar is usually used to create musical sounds, like any other MIDI controller it could also be used to trigger such devices as MIDI-enabled lighting controllers, effects devices and audio consoles.

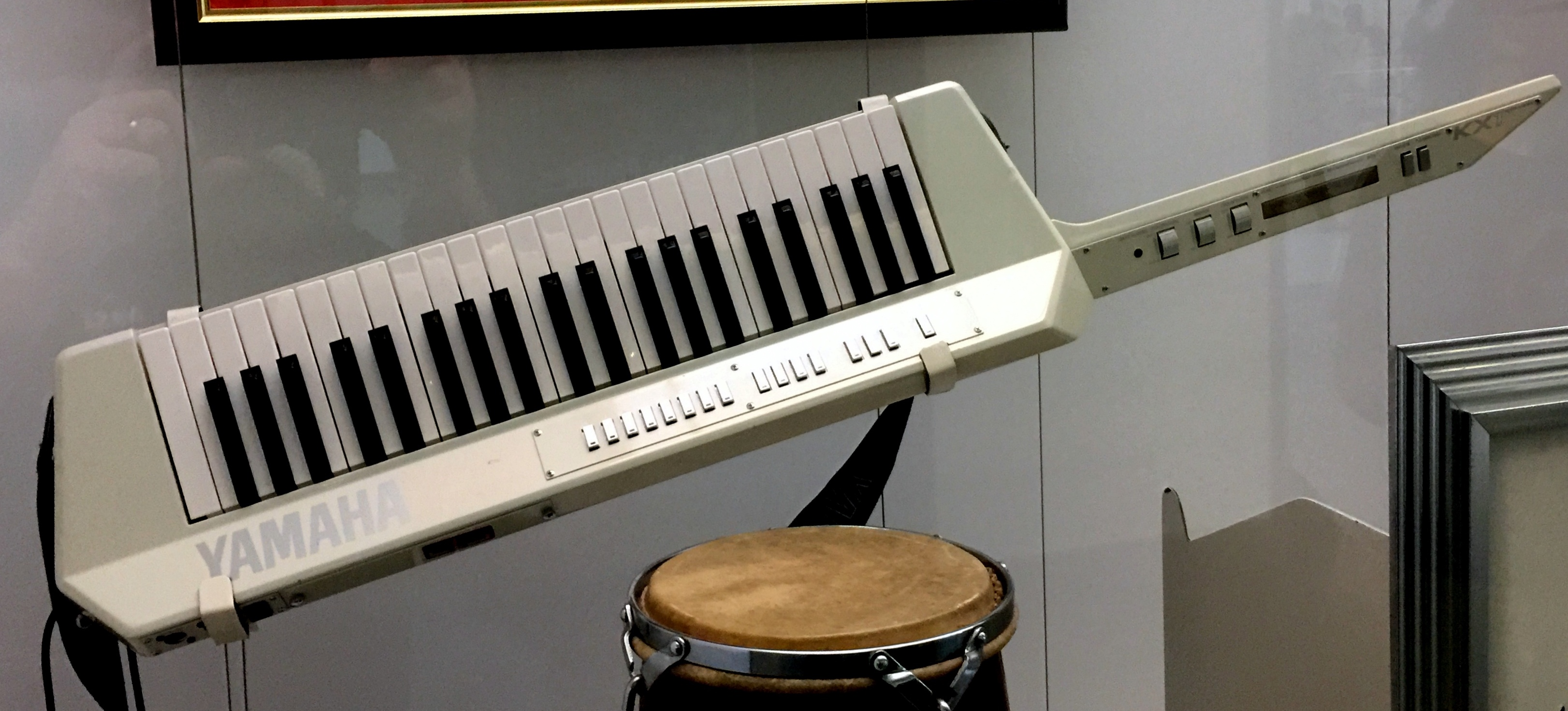
Herbie Hancock's Yamaha KX1 MIDI controller on display at the Smithsonian National Museum of American History

== History ==
=== Early history (18th century–1970s) ===
The oldest forerunner of the keytar is likely the orphica, a small portable piano invented in Vienna in 1795, which was played in a similar position as the modern keytar. The piano accordion first appeared in 1852, it was essentially a Miniature version of the Reed Organ that's worn on straps and is pumped with the player's left hand. In 1963, the East German manufacturer Weltmeister introduced the Basset, as a Keytar shaped Electric Bass Piano. In 1966, Swedish organ manufacturer Joh Mustad AB introduced the Tubon, a tubular electric organ. This instrument was worn with a strap around the shoulder and could be played standing or sitting. The Tubon had a half-keyboard on one end accessible to the right hand, controls to be used at the "neck" on the opposite end for the left hand, and a speaker at the end of the tube. It was sold in the UK as the Livingstone. It saw use by Kraftwerk and Paul McCartney in the 1960s and early 1970s.

In the early 1970s, Edgar Winter often performed with keyboards slung around his neck, but they were not technically keytars because they had no "neck"; he actually used an ARP 2600 keyboard and a lightweight Univox electronic piano with shoulder straps added.

=== Keytar as synthesizer/controller (1970s–) ===
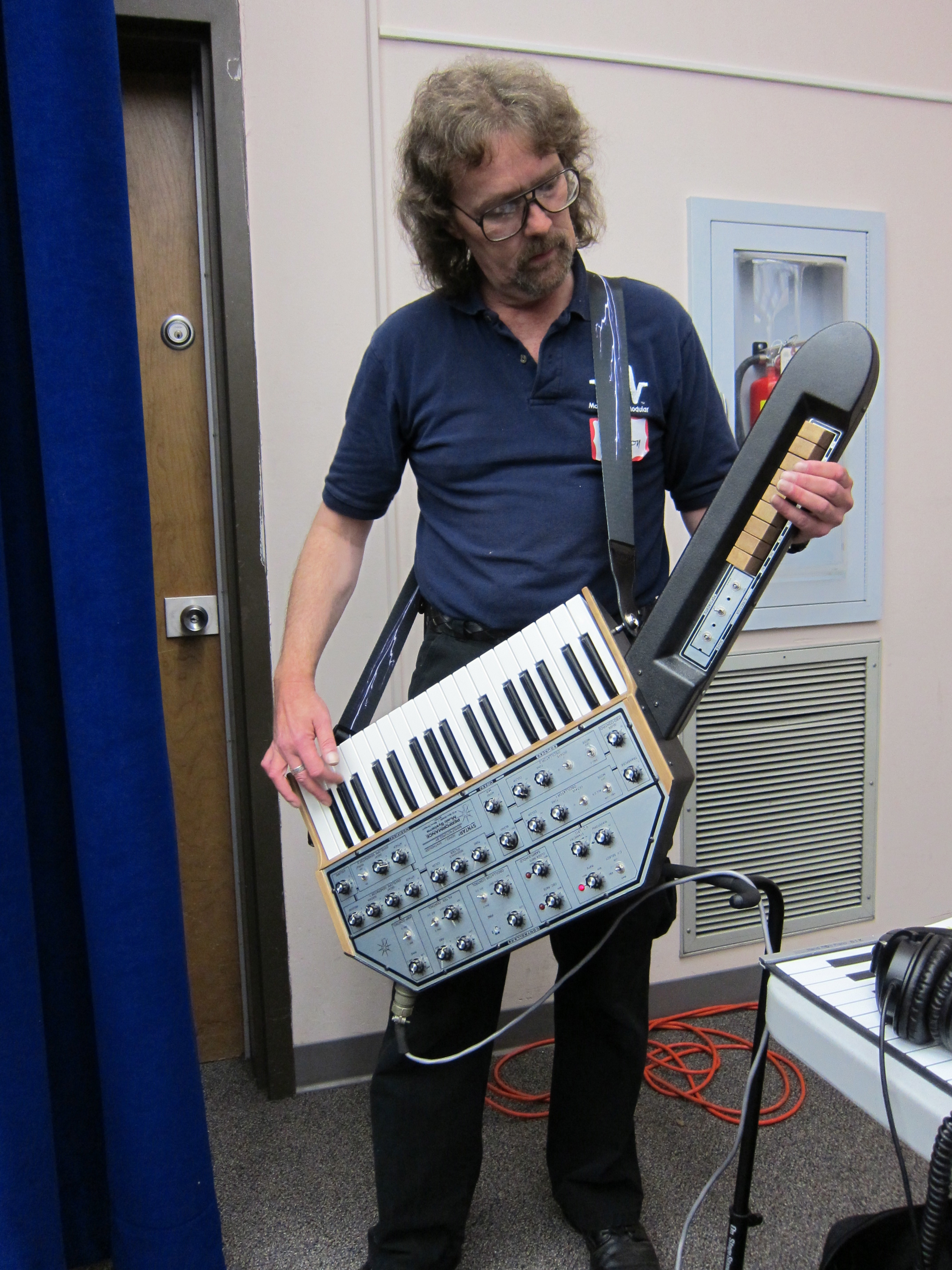
Performance Music Systems Syntar and its inventor, George Mattson. The Syntar was the earliest keytar synthesizer product exhibited at the 1979 Atlanta NAMM Expo.

The earlier keytars commercially released in late 1970s–early 1980s includes:

- Hillwood RockeyBoard RB-1 (synth piano with VCF) released in 1977 with influence from Edgar Winter,
- PMS Syntar, an early keytar synthesizer released by George Mattson (Performance Music Systems) and exhibited at the 1979 NAMM International Music & Sound Expo in Atlanta
- Davis Clavitar (controller) used by George Duke and Herbie Hancock in early 1980
- Powell Probe (controller) designed by Roger Powell, and
- Royalex Probe (controller) helped to develop and used by Jan Hammer in early 1980s

etc. (for details, see List of keytars)

In late 1970s and early 1980s, Jan Hammer, the composer best known for his composition and sound design successes for Miami Vice, frequently used several keytars including Royalex PROBE which he helped develop. Hammer is seen for instance using his PROBE in the music video for the "Miami Vice Theme". Also in the 1980s, Wayne Famous of the band the Producers strapped on a regular Oberheim OB-X synthesizer, which caused him to develop back problems.

Among them, the most widely known earlier keytar may be the "Moog Liberation" released in 1980. Early users included Spyro Gyra keyboardist Tom Schuman. Though Devo is associated with keytars, they never used them except in music videos and promotional ads for the Liberation. The earliest printed use of the word "keytar" was in 1980, when it appeared in an interview with Jeffrey Abbott (Keytarjeff) by Tom Lounges of Illianabeat magazine (now Midwest BEAT Magazine) who now hosts a weekly interview show featuring legends of the music industry on N.W. Indiana's PBR radio station.

Although Steve Masakowski has been incorrectly credited for many years as the inventor of the keytar, in an interview with Peter Hartlaub of the San Francisco Chronicle on December 11, 2009, he only claimed to have invented an instrument called the Key-tar which was a string-based instrument.

The keytar was made popular in the 1980s by glam metal bands, as well as synthpop, new wave and electro musicians. Changing trends in music diminished the keytar's popularity during the 1990s, continuing on until the late 2000s when a major revival was sparked by artists and groups such as The Black Eyed Peas, Damas Gratis, Flight of The Conchords, Motion City Soundtrack, No Doubt, and Steely Dan. Another instance is in early 2008 with Snoop Dogg's music video for his single "Sensual Seduction", in which he uses a keytar as a throwback to old school bands.

=== Current state (2010s–) ===
Notable manufacturers of keytar models have included Moog, Roland, Yamaha, Korg and Casio. As of 2013, the Roland AX-Synth, the Roland Lucina, the Alesis Vortex and Rock Band 3 Wireless Pro Keyboard, are the mass-manufactured keytars on the market.

Starr Labs manufacturers a variation on the keytar (called a Ztar) that plays to the strengths of guitarists, featuring a neck of piano-styled keys arranged on the fretboard instead of strings.

A woman performing with a keytar in South Korea, 2013

== Examples ==
=== 1980s–1990s ===
The Moog Liberation was released in 1980 by Moog Music, and was considered the first mass-produced strap synthesizer. It included two monophonic VCOs and a polyphonic section that could play organ sounds. The neck had spring-loaded wheels for filter cutoff, modulation, and volume as well as a ribbon-controlled pitch bend. The Liberation had a single VCF and two ADS envelope generators.

The Roland SH-101 is a small, 32-key, monophonic analog synthesizer from the early 1980s. It has one oscillator with two waveforms, an 'octave-divided' sub-oscillator, and a low-pass filter/VCF capable of self oscillation. When a shoulder strap is connected to it, and the small handgrip with a pitch bend wheel and a pitch modulation trigger is used, the SH-101 becomes a keytar.

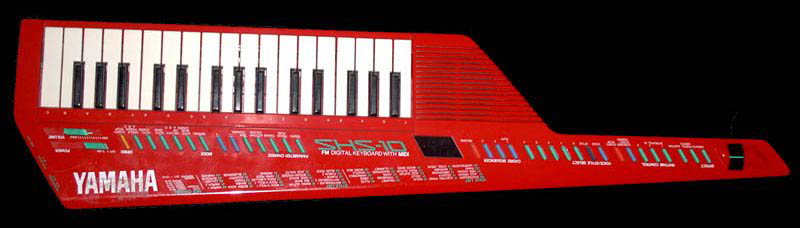
Yamaha SHS-10

The Yamaha SHS-10, released in 1987, has a small keyboard with 32 minikeys and a pitch-bend wheel, an internal Frequency modulation (usually referred to as FM) synthesizer offering 25 different voices with 6-note polyphony. Onboard voices include a range of keyboard instruments (pipe organ, piano, electric piano, etc.); strings (violin, guitar, double bass, etc.); and wind and brass (clarinet, flute, trumpet, etc.). A larger model, the Yamaha SHS-200, was released the following year, and came with 49 keys and dual stereo speakers.

The musician Prince held the patent for a specific ornamental design of the keytar, which was granted on July 26th 1994. He named it the ‘PurpleAxxe’ and it was played extensively on stage by Tommy Barbarella, a member of his New Power Generation band.

=== 2000s–present ===
Herbie Hancock performing with a Roland AX-7 at the XM Sonic Stage at The Bonnaroo Music & Arts Festival

The Roland AX-7, which was manufactured from 2001 to 2007, contains many more advanced features than early keytars. It has 45 velocity sensitive keys (without aftertouch), and a 3-character LED display. Several features aimed towards stage performance are present, such as a pitch bend ribbon, touchpad-like expression bar, sustain switch, and volume control knob, all on the upper neck of the instrument. There is also a proprietary "D-Beam" interface, made up of infrared sensors that detect nearby motion. This interface can be used to trigger and control effects.

In August 2009, Roland released the Roland AX-Synth, a model of keytar that contains its own synthesizer sounds in addition to being a MIDI/USB controller. In 2010, Roland released the Roland Lucina AX-09. This model does not have a traditional neck, but is still considered a keytar because of it is a strap-on model and is in the AX line, with many identical features to its AX predecessors. It is unique in that it includes an additional, front panel USB port to accommodate a USB flash drive, which may contain MP3, WAV or AIFF files for playback. The Lucina has 150 internal sounds and may also be used as a MIDI/USB controller.

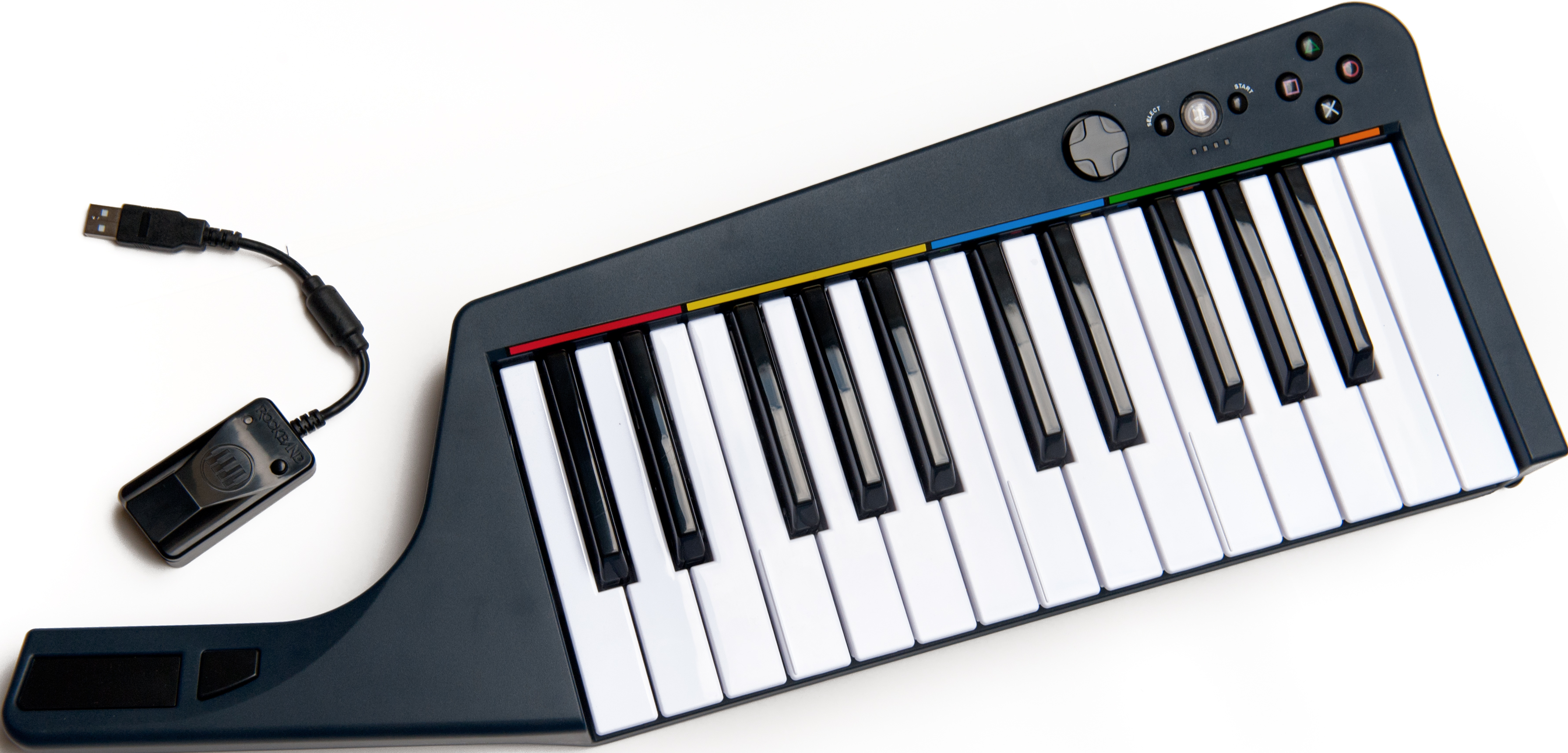
Rock Band 3 Wireless Pro Keyboard

Also in 2010, Mad Catz released the Wireless Pro Keyboard for Rock Band 3, a 25-key velocity-sensitive MIDI-compatible keytar controller. Despite its sub-$100 price, it is designed for serious use outside of the game. Synthpop band Freezepop have used it on stage.

In 2012, Alesis released its first keytar and is the first major manufacturer to actually use the term "keytar" in the model name and description. The Alesis Vortex USB/MIDI Keytar Controller is unique in that it includes eight velocity-sensitive drum pads/sample triggers, which enable the performer to create beats or trigger clips, built right into the body of the keytar. It also features an accelerometer, which allows the performer to control MIDI parameters by tilting the neck. Although Alesis claims to have manufactured "the first USB keytar controller", the Roland AX-Synth and the Roland Lucina feature USB connections with the same function and were released three years prior to the Alesis Vortex.

== See also ==
- List of keytarists

Related technologies

- MIDI
- Chapman Stick
- Guitar synthesizer

Individual models

- Moog Liberation
- Drumitar
- Zendrum
