= Ribbon controller =

Tactile sensor used to control synthesizers

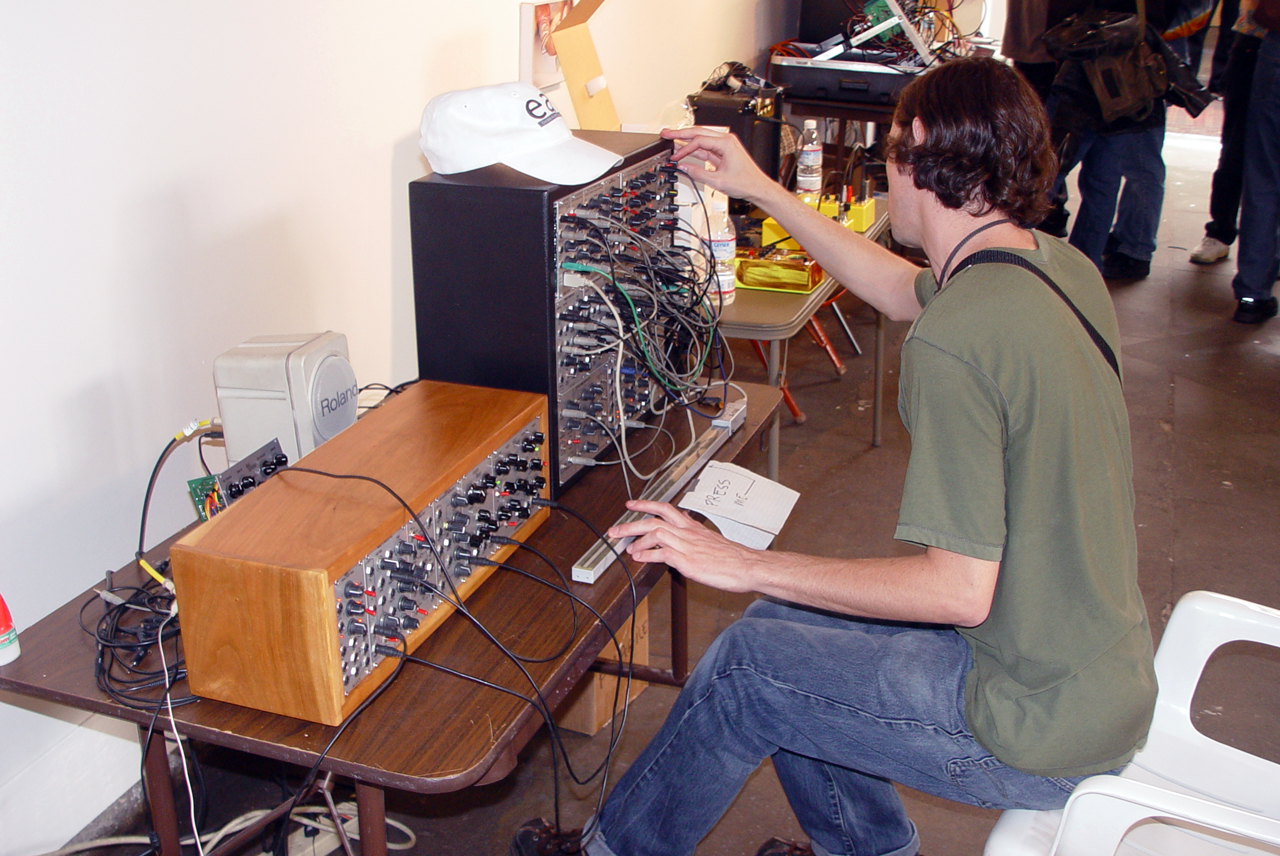
A musician using a ribbon controller to control an analog modular synthesizer

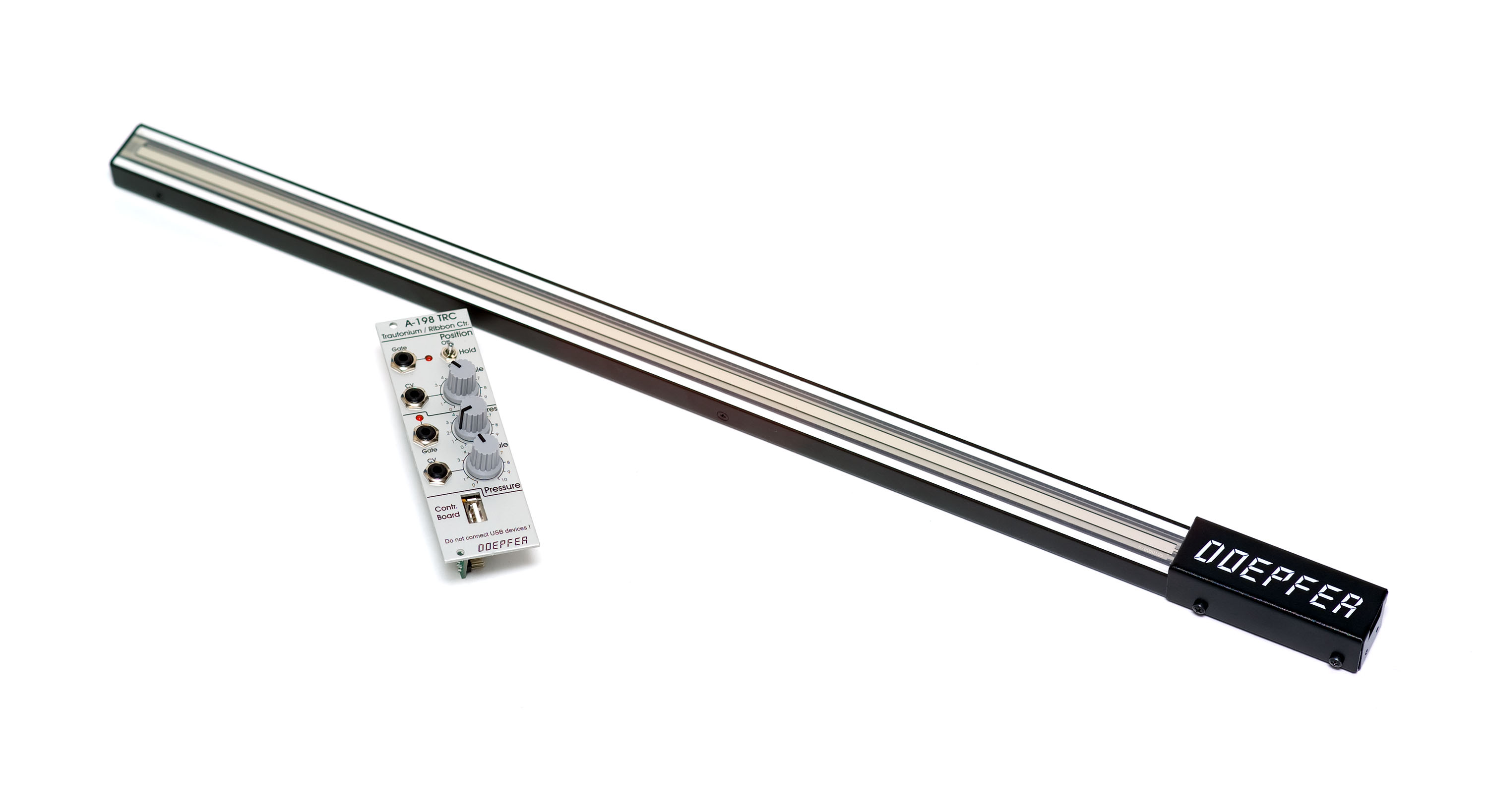
A Doepfer A-198 ribbon controller, with its associated eurorack control module

A ribbon controller is a tactile sensor used to control synthesizers. It generally consists of a resistive strip that acts as a potentiometer. Because of its continuous control, ribbon controllers are often used to produce glissando effects.

== Development ==
Early examples of the use of ribbon controllers in a musical instrument are in the Ondes Martenot and Trautonium. In some early instruments, the slider of the potentiometer was worn as a ring by the player. In later ribbon controllers, the ring was replaced by a conductive layer that covered the resistive element.

Ribbon controllers are found in early Moog synthesizers, but were omitted from most later synthesizers. The Yamaha CS-80 synthesizer is well-known for its inclusion of a ribbon controller, used by Vangelis to create many of the characteristic sounds in the Blade Runner soundtrack.

Although ribbon controllers are less common in analog later synthesizers, they were used in the Moog Liberation and Micromoog.

== Later uses ==
There was a resurgence of ribbon controllers on synthesizers in the mid-1990s, beginning with Korg's physical and analog modeling performance synthesizer Prophecy (1995), incorporating a unique pressure/position ribbon mounted on a modulation wheel ("log"), and their Trinity (1995) workstation (which could accommodate a Prophecy counterpart SOLO-TRI option board), as well as Kurzweil's K2500-series workstations (keyboard versions, 1996), which incorporated both a 4-inch pressure/position ribbon and a separate 600mm-long position ribbon programmable into multiple zones. Roland incorporated a ribbon controller in their JP-8000 (1996) synthesizer.

Most Otamatone models incorporate a ribbon controller in the 'note stem' portion of the instrument.

As of 2020, ribbon controllers are available as control voltage and MIDI peripherals. An example of a modern synthesizer that uses a ribbon controller is the Swarmatron.

Later in 2010/2011, Korg released a series of minisynths called Monotron using the ribbon controller, it became so popular that it still in production in 2023.
