= Yamaha SHS-10 =

Musical keyboard that can be held like a guitar

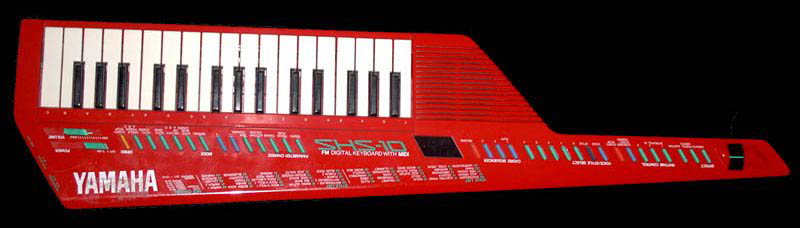
- Yamaha SHS-10
- Manufacturer: Yamaha
- Dates: 1987

Technical specifications
- Polyphony: 6 voices
- Timbrality: 4
- Oscillator: 2 operators
- LFO: none
- Synthesis type: Digital Frequency modulation
- Filter: none
- Attenuator: 1
- Aftertouch expression: none
- Velocity expression: none
- Storage memory: 25 patches

Input/output
- Keyboard: 32 mini-keys
- External control: MIDI 1-16 (out only)

The Yamaha SHS-10, known in Yamaha's native country, Japan, as the Yamaha Sholky, Sholky being derived from "Shoulder Keyboard", is a keytar (a musical keyboard that can be held like a guitar) manufactured by Yamaha and released in 1987.

It has a small-sized keyboard with 32 minikeys and a pitch-bend wheel, vibrato and sustain buttons, an internal Frequency modulation (usually referred to as FM) synthesizer offering 25 different voices with 6-note polyphony, two operators, and a very basic chord sequencer. It also has a loudspeaker.

It supports MIDI, having a MIDI Out connector which allows the keyboard to control external MIDI equipment. It does not have a MIDI In connector. Although originally made for the consumer market, this keytar's MIDI out features are very powerful. Its drum rhythms and accompaniment are transmitted on separate MIDI channels, so that an external drum machine, sampler, or other MIDI equipment can be programmed to play the backing parts. Drums are transmitted on channel 16; Bass on 15; and three chord harmonies on channels 12-14. MIDI start/stop and tempo sync are also transmitted so an external sequencer may be utilized as well.

It was manufactured in three colors: grey, red, and black.

Its demo is an arrangement of Wham!'s hit "Last Christmas."

The Voices are the following:

00	Synthesizer	20	Violin	40	Flute
01	Jazz Organ	21	Cello	41	Oboe
02	Pipe Organ	22	Jazz Guitar	42	Harmonica
03	Piano	23	Rock Guitar	43	Whistle
04	Harpsichord	24	Wood Bass	44	Music Box
10	Electric Piano	30	Trumpet		
11	Celesta	31	Trombone		
12	Vibraphone	32	Horn		
13	Marimba	33	Saxophone		
14	Steel Drum	34	Clarinet		

The numbering scheme reflects the fact that the selection is done with buttons numbered 0-4.

A larger model, the Yamaha SHS-200, was released the following year, and came with 49 keys and dual stereo speakers.
