= Moog Liberation =

Keytar synthesizer

Liberation
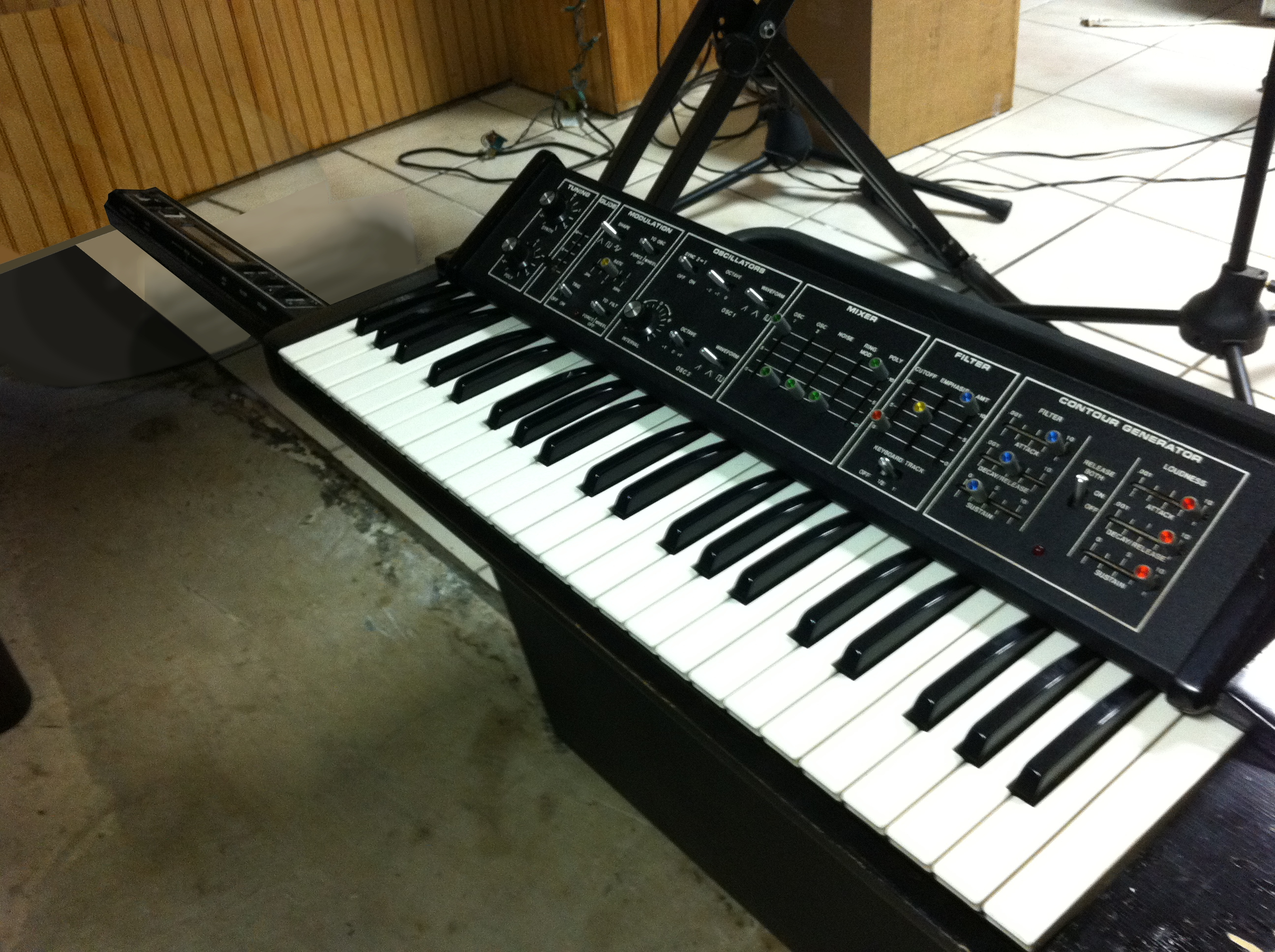
- Original factory brochure
- Manufacturer: Moog Music
- Dates: 1980

Technical specifications
- Polyphony: Monophonic (Osc1&2); Paraphonic (Poly)
- Oscillator: 2
- LFO: 1
- Synthesis type: Analog subtractive
- Filter: 1 low-pass
- Attenuator: ASD
- Storage memory: none
- Effects: Ring modulation

Input/output
- Keyboard: 44 keys
- Left-hand control: Ribbon controller
- External control: CV/Gate

The Moog Liberation was one of the first commercially produced "keytar" synthesizers, released in 1980 by Moog Music. The instrument is comparable to the Realistic Concertmate MG-1 and the Moog Rogue, but it is most closely related to the Moog Prodigy; however, as a keytar, the Liberation was designed to be played in the same posture as one would play a guitar.

The Liberation features two monophonic voltage-controlled oscillators and a polyphonic section that can play organ sounds. Both oscillators can be set to triangle, sawtooth, or square waveforms and switched over a 3-octave range. The keyboard is aftertouch-sensitive and the neck features spring-loaded wheels for filter cutoff, modulation, and volume, as well as a ribbon-controlled pitch bend. The Liberation has a single voltage-controlled filter and 2 ADSR envelope generators. A 40-foot cable connects the Liberation to its rackmounted half which houses the power supply and CV/Gate output sockets.

== Notable users ==
Jean-Michel Jarre plays a Liberation on the DVD release of Oxygène Live in Your Living Room. It also appears in the bonus section with Jarre describing the instruments.

The Human League used a Liberation in the songs "Empire State Human", "Being Boiled", and "Circus of Death" at the Wickerman Festival in July 2009.

Other artists who have used the instrument include James Brown, Didier Marouani of Space, Tom Coster of Santana, Tommy Cyborg of Chrome, Herbie Hancock, Joy Electric, Danny Peyronel of UFO, Michael Busse of Spider Murphy Gang, Six Finger Satellite, Page McConnell of Phish, and Saga. Though Devo is commonly associated with the Moog Liberation, the band never used it on stage or in the studio, only in music videos and for a promotional ad for the synthesizer.

A Moog Liberation was also used as a prop in the How I Met Your Mother episode "Glitter."

== Images ==
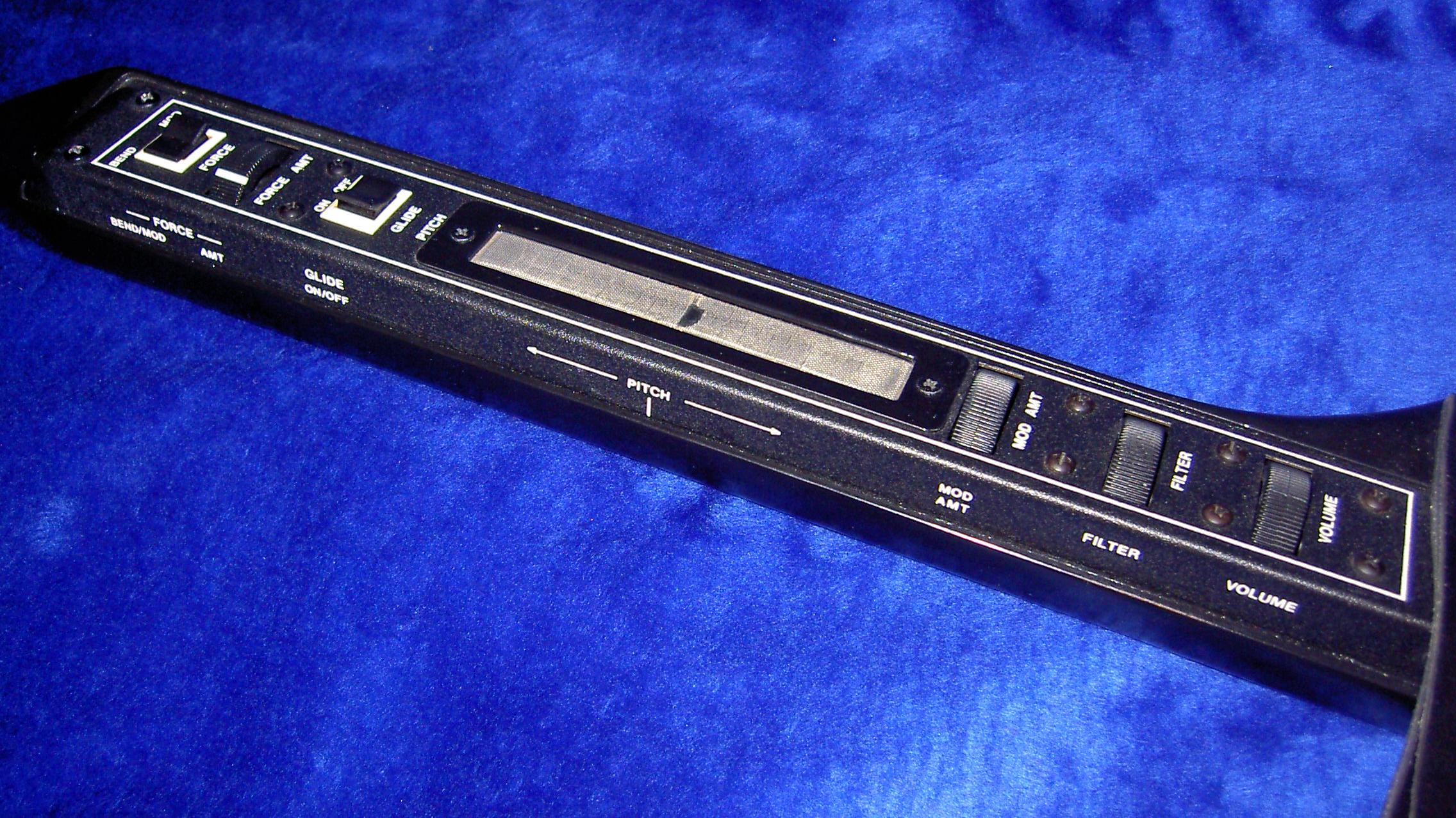
Neck
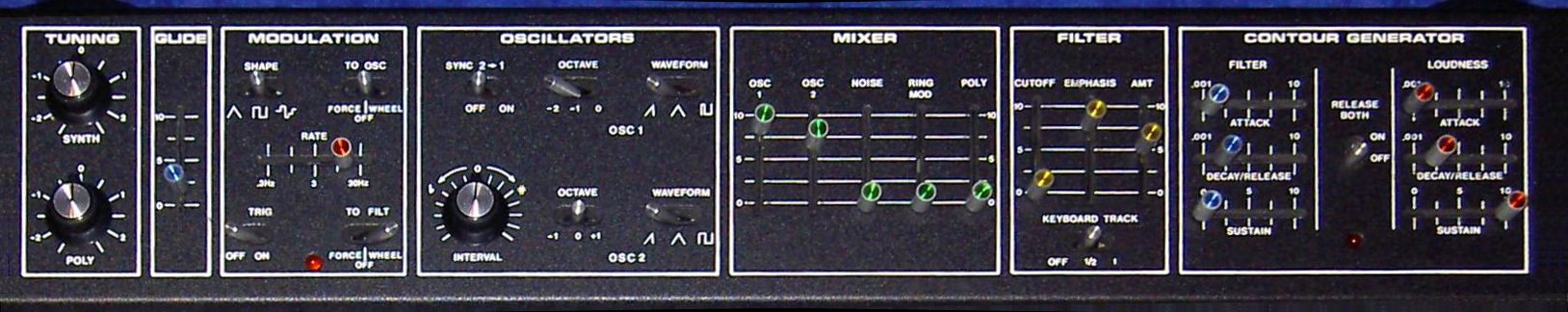
Control panel
