= 390° of Simulated Stereo =

Live album by Pere Ubu
- Released: March 1981
- Venue: Cleveland, London, Brussels
- Genre: Post-punk
- Label: Rough Trade (original release); Fire (2021 reissue)

Pere Ubu chronology
The Art of Walking (1980)	390° of Simulated Stereo (1981)	Song of the Bailing Man (1982)

Professional ratings
Review scores
Source	Rating
AllMusic	2/5 stars
Chicago Tribune	3.5/4 stars
Robert Christgau	B+

390° of Simulated Stereo is a live album featuring recordings from Pere Ubu's first few years of existence. In general, the recordings featured are lo-fi in nature. The album was out of print for decades, but was reissued for Record Store Day 2021.

== Track listing ==
1. "Non-alignment Pact" – 3:45
2. "Street Waves" – 4:08
3. "Real World" – 4:05
4. "My Dark Ages" – 5:32
5. "Modern Dance" – 3:33
6. "Humor Me" – 2:44
7. "Heart of Darkness" – 4:07
8. "Laughing" – 5:15
9. "Can't Believe It" – 2:16
10. "Over My Head" – 4:46
11. "Sentimental Journey" – 4:53
12. "30 Seconds Over Tokyo" – 5:42

All songs were either taken from The Modern Dance, the group's first LP, or were among Pere Ubu's earliest singles later collected on Terminal Tower. The only exception is the song "Can't Believe It", which is exclusive to this release. The track listing on the CD version's rear tray card and disc label are incorrect; all the correct songs are listed but in scrambled order.

- 1, 8 – December 5, 1978 at College of Printing, London
- 2 – May 5, 1978 at Theater 140, Brussels
- 3, 4 – February 18, 1978 at Disasto 2, WHK Auditorium, Cleveland
- 5 – March 2, 1979 at International Garage Exhibition, Cleveland State University
- 6 – October 14, 1977 at Pere Ubu rehearsal loft, Cleveland
- 7 – December 6, 1978 at Brunel University, Uxbridge
- 9-11 – May 1976 at The Mistake, Cleveland
- 12 – August 4, 1977 at Pirate's Cove in The Flats, Cleveland

Note: The 2021 Record Store Day reissue omits Track 6 "Humor Me" and Track 12 "30 Seconds Over Tokyo" to increase the fidelity of the vinyl reissue. However, those two songs are present on a download code that comes with the vinyl. This reissue has "V.21C" added to the title, and the cover is Yellow instead of White.

== Personnel ==
Pere Ubu

- David Thomas – vocals, horn, percussion, cover design
- Tom Herman – guitar, bass, backing vocals
- Allen Ravenstine – EML synthesizers, saxophone (1–8, 12)
- Tony Maimone – bass, backing vocals (1–8, 12)
- Scott Krauss – drums
- Peter Laughner – guitar, bass, backing vocals (9–11)
- Dave Taylor – synthesizer, organ (9–11)
- Tim Wright – bass, guitar (9–11)

Technical

- Pat Ryan, Paul Hamann – sound recordings
