= Terminal Tower (album) =

Compilation album by Pere Ubu
- Released: 1985
- Genres: Art punk, post-punk
- Label: Rough Trade
- Producers: Paul Hamann, Pere Ubu

Pere Ubu chronology
Song of the Bailing Man (1982)	Terminal Tower (1985)	The Tenement Year (1988)

Professional ratings
Review scores
Source	Rating
AllMusic	5/5 stars
Chicago Sun-Times	4/4 stars
Encyclopedia of Popular Music	4/5 stars
Hi-Fi News & Record Review	A/B:1
MusicHound Rock	5/5
Q	4/5 stars
The Rolling Stone Album Guide	4/5 stars
Spin Alternative Record Guide	9/10
The Village Voice	A−

Terminal Tower: An Archival Collection is a compilation album by the American rock band Pere Ubu. Released in 1985, the album compiles several of the band's early singles and B-sides, including the Hearthan Records singles recorded with founding member Peter Laughner that were initially compiled on the EP Datapanik in the Year Zero and continuing through later sides recorded with Mayo Thompson.

The original American Twin Tone LP and CD releases of the album both played at a slightly slower speed than the original recordings throughout, had the left and right channels reversed, and suffered from generally poor sound quality. Most of the compilation was properly remastered for the Datapanik in the Year Zero box set, and all subsequent reissues of the compilation have used that corrected master.

== Track listing ==
No.	Title	Writer(s)	Length
1.	"Heart of Darkness"	Tom Herman, Peter Laughner, David Thomas, Tim Wright	4:44
2.	"30 Seconds Over Tokyo"	Thomas, Laughner, Gene O'Connor	6:19
3.	"Final Solution"	Craig Bell, Herman, Scott Krauss, Laughner, Dave Taylor, Thomas, Wright	3:28
4.	"Cloud 149"	Herman, Krauss, Laughner, Taylor, Thomas, Wright	3:05
5.	"Untitled" (early/alternate version of "The Modern Dance")	Herman, Krauss, Allen Ravenstine, Thomas, Wright	4:08
6.	"My Dark Ages"	Herman, Krauss, Tony Maimone, Ravenstine, Thomas	4:57
7.	"Heaven"	Herman, Krauss, Maimone, Ravenstine, Thomas	2:37
8.	"Humor Me" (live at London College of Printing, London, December 5, 1978)	Herman, Krauss, Maimone, Ravenstine, Thomas	4:00
9.	"The Book Is on the Table"	Herman, Krauss, Maimone, Ravenstine, Thomas	3:01
10.	"Not Happy"	Herman, Krauss, Maimone, Ravenstine, Thomas, Mayo Thompson	3:26
11.	"Lonesome Cowboy Dave"	Herman, Krauss, Maimone, Ravenstine, Thomas, Thompson	1:53

== Personnel ==
- Tom Herman – guitar, bass guitar
- Peter Laughner – guitar, bass guitar
- Tim Wright – bass guitar, guitar
- Mayo Thompson – guitar
- Scott Krauss – drums
- Tony Maimone – bass guitar
- Allen Ravenstine – EML synthesizers, saxophone, vocals
- David Thomas – vocals, trombone
- Chris Cutler – drums, percussion, sounds
- Dave Taylor – EML synthesizers, Ace Tone organ on "Final Solution" and "Cloud 149"
- Alan Greenblatt – rhythm guitar on "Untitled"
