= The Shape of Things (album) =

Live album by Pere Ubu
- Released: October 2000
- Recorded: April 7, 1976
- Venues: The Mistake, Cleveland, Ohio
- Genres: Post-punk, experimental rock
- Label: Hearpen Records
- Producer: Jim Jones

Pere Ubu chronology
| Apocalypse Now (1998) | The Shape of Things (2000) | St. Arkansas (2002) |

Professional ratings
Review scores
| Source | Rating |
|---|---|
| Allmusic | 2.5/5 stars |
| Pitchfork Media | (6.8/10) |

The Shape of Things is Pere Ubu's fourth live album. It documents a performance within the band's first few months of existence, from the brief period in which Peter Laughner was a member. Initially produced only as a tour merchandise item, it has since been released to retail.

== Track listing ==
All tracks composed by Pere Ubu (Dave Taylor, David Thomas, Peter Laughner, Scott Krauss, Tim Wright, Tom Herman); except where indicated

1. "Heart of Darkness" (Thomas, Laughner, Krauss, Wright, Herman) – 7:48
2. "Cloud 149" – 3:20
3. "Gone Gone Gone" – 5:38
4. "30 Seconds Over Tokyo" (Thomas, Gene O'Connor, Laughner) – 8:59
5. "Life Stinks" – 2:30
6. "Final Solution" (Thomas, Craig Bell, Laughner, Krauss, Wright, Herman) – 6:41
7. "Pushin' Too Hard" (Sky Saxon) – 5:52
8. "The Way She Looks" – 5:15
9. "Doris Day Sings Sentimental Journey" – 5:16
10. "Can't Believe It" – 2:39
11. "I Wanna Be Your Dog" (David Alexander, Iggy Pop, Ron Asheton, Scott Asheton) – 4:51
12. "Heroin/Outro" (Lou Reed) – 8:56

== Personnel ==
Pere Ubu

- David Thomas – vocals, harp
- Peter Laughner – guitar, vocals, bass
- Tom Herman – guitar, bass
- Tim Wright – bass, guitar
- Dave Taylor – EML synthesizer, Ace Tone organ
- Scott Krauss – drums
