= Datapanik in the Year Zero =

Box set by Pere Ubu
- Released: 1996
- Recorded: 1975–1982
- Genre: Post-punk, experimental rock, avant-garde music
- Label: DGC (original release); Cooking Vinyl (reissue)

Pere Ubu chronology
Ray Gun Suitcase (1995)	Datapanik in the Year Zero (1996)	Pennsylvania (1998)

Professional ratings
Review scores
Source	Rating
Allmusic	4.5/5 stars
Rolling Stone	4/5 stars

Datapanik in the Year Zero is a 1996 box set by Pere Ubu, which catalogues their initial phase of existence up to their 1982 break-up (which later turned out to be merely a hiatus). The title was first used by the band for a 1978 EP which compiled their first singles; the name was "recycled" for this release. The name references the Cold War film Panic in Year Zero! (1962).

This box set compiles the original EP of the same name, their first five albums (which were out of print at the time this set was released), along with a disc of live material, and another of related rarities. It omits "Use of a Dog" from Song of the Bailing Man, "Humor Me", "Not Happy" and "Lonesome Cowboy Dave" from Terminal Tower and the vocal version of "Arabia" from The Art of Walking. Since, according to David Thomas, Pere Ubu do not produce outtakes or alternate versions (aside from a few anomalies related to an early version of The Art of Walking), the rarities disc is unique in that it features groups that were sometimes only tangentially related to Ubu, in an effort to present an overview of the mercurial Cleveland scene out of which they grew.

In 2009, Cooking Vinyl released a remastered version of the box set. It restores "Use of a Dog" but omits the fourth disc of live recordings.

== Track listing ==
All tracks by Pere Ubu

Disc 1: 1975-1977

1. "30 Seconds Over Tokyo" – 6:21
2. "Heart of Darkness" – 4:44
3. "Final Solution" – 4:58
4. "Cloud 149" – 2:37
5. "Untitled" – 3:32
6. "My Dark Ages" – 4:00
7. "Heaven" – 3:04
8. "Nonalignment Pact" – 3:18
9. "The Modern Dance" – 3:28 (album mix)
10. "Laughing" – 4:35
11. "Street Waves" – 3:04
12. "Chinese Radiation" – 3:27
13. "Life Stinks" – 1:52
14. "Real World" – 4:00
15. "Over My Head" – 3:49
16. "Sentimental Journey" – 6:06
17. "Humor Me" – 2:43
18. "The Book Is on the Table" – 4:02

Disc 2: 1978-1979

1. "Navvy" – 2:40
2. "On the Surface" – 2:35
3. "Dub Housing" – 3:40
4. "Caligari's Mirror" – 3:49
5. "Thriller!" – 4:36
6. "I, Will Wait" – 1:46
7. "Drinking Wine Spodyody" – 2:44
8. "Ubu Dance Party" – 4:46
9. "Blow Daddy O" – 3:38
10. "Codex" – 4:54
11. "The Fabulous Sequel (Have Shoes, Will Walk)" – 3:07
12. "49 Guitars & One Girl" – 2:51
13. "A Small Dark Cloud" – 5:49
14. "Small Was Fast" – 3:30
15. "All the Dogs Are Barking" – 3:02
16. "One Less Worry" – 3:46
17. "Make Hay" – 4:02
18. "Goodbye" – 5:17
19. "Voice of the Sand" – 1:27
20. "Jehovah's Kingdom Comes" – 3:15

Disc 3: 1980-1982

1. "Go" – 3:35
2. "Rhapsody in Pink" – 3:34
3. "Arabia" – 4:59
4. "Young Miles in the Basement" – 4:20
5. "Misery Goats" – 2:38
6. "Loop" – 3:15
7. "Rounder" – 3:24
8. "Birdies" – 2:27
9. "Lost in Art" – 5:12
10. "Horses" – 2:35
11. "Crush This Horn" – 3:00
12. "The Long Walk Home" – 2:35
13. "Petrified" – 2:16
14. "Stormy Weather" – 3:18
15. "West Side Story" – 2:46
16. "Thoughts That Go by Steam" – 3:47
17. "Big Ed's Used Farms" – 2:24
18. "A Day Such as This" – 7:16
19. "The Vulgar Boatman Bird" – 2:49
20. "My Hat" – 1:19
21. "Horns Are a Dilemma" – 4:21

Disc 4: 390 Degrees of Simulated Stereo, Volume 2

1. "Vocal Liner Notes" 0:56
2. "Theatre 140, 5/5/78" 0:07
3. "Real World" – 4:32
4. "Laughing" – 5:19
5. "Street Waves" – 4:30
6. "Humor Me" – 3:08
7. "Over My Head" – 5:00
8. "Sentimental Journey" – 8:49
9. "Life Stinks" – 3:13
10. "My Dark Ages" – 5:30
11. "C. Teatro Medica, 3/3/81" 0:11
12. "The Modern Dance" – 3:40
13. "Codex" – 3:24
14. "Ubu Dance Party" – 3:57
15. "Big Ed's Used Farms" – 3:27
16. "Real World" – 2:46
17. "Birdies" – 2:15

Disc 5: Terminal Drive (Ubu-related rarities)

1. Foreign Bodies: "The Incredible Truth" – 2:35
2. 15-60-75: "It's in Imagination" – 4:43
3. Syd's Dance Band: "Never Again" – 2:20
4. Carney & Thomas: "Sunset in the Antipodes" – 2:26
5. Home & Garden: "(please) FIX MY HORN (my brakes don't work)" – 3:24
6. Neptune's Car: "Baking Bread" – 2:13
7. David Thomas: "Atom Mind" – 2:29
8. Tripod Jimmie: "Autumn Leaves" – 4:17
9. Friction: "Dear Richard" – 5:56
10. Pressler-Morgan: "You're Gonna Watch Me" – 1:40
11. Rocket from the Tombs: "Amphetamine" – 5:32
12. Mirrors: "She Smiled Wild" – 3:57
13. Electric Eels: "Jaguar Ride" – 1:46
14. Tom Hermann: "Steve Canyon Blues" – 4:17
15. Allen Ravenstine: "Home Life" – 6:47
16. Rocket from the Tombs: "30 Seconds Over Tokyo" – 7:00
17. Proto Ubu: "Heart of Darkness" – 8:47
18. Pere Ubu: "Pushin' Too Hard" – 3:54

== Personnel ==
Musicians

- David Thomas – Vocals, Organ, Harmonica, Saxophone, Producer, Performer, Digital Transfers, Compilation Producer
- Michael Aylward – Guitar
- John Freskos – Guitar
- Alan Greenblatt – Guitar
- Bob Kidney – Guitar, Vocals
- Jamie Klimek – Guitar, Vocals
- Peter Laughner – Guitar, Vocals
- Brian McMahon – Guitar
- Douglas Morgan – Guitar, Harp, Vocals, Producer
- Pat Morgan – Guitar
- John Morton – Guitar
- Susan Schmidt – Guitar
- Michael Stacey – Guitar
- Mayo Thompson – Guitar
- Cindy Black – Moog Synthesizer
- Ralph Carney – Keyboards, Saxophone
- Eric Drew Feldman – Keyboards
- Scott Krauss – Organ, Drums, Tape
- Tony Maimone – Synthesizer, Bass, Keyboards, Vocals
- Allen Ravenstine – Synthesizer, Tape, Performer
- Robert Wheeler – Synthesizer, Theremin
- Lenny Bove – Bass
- Brian Cox – Bass
- Jim Crook – Bass
- Albert Dennis – Bowed Bass
- Paul Hamann – Bass, Producer, Digital Transfers
- Tom Herman – Bass, Rhythm Guitar, Vocals
- Bart Johnson – Bass
- Jim Jones – Bass, Producer, Compilation Producer
- Mark Price – Bass
- Michele Temple – Bass
- Tim Wright – Bass, Guitar
- Scott Benedict – Drums
- Anton Fier – Drums
- Chris Cutler – Drums
- Dave Robinson – Drums
- Michael J. Weldon – Drums
- Terry Hynde – Alto Saxophone
- Jack Kidney – Tenor Saxophone
- The Electric Eels – Performer
- Friction – Performer
- Morgan – Performer
- Rocket from the Tombs – Performer
- Tripod Jimmie – Performer

Production

- Kenneth Hamann – Producer
- Home and Garden – Producer
- Adam Kidron – Producer
- Paul Marotta – Producer
- Pere Ubu – Producer
- Pat Ryan – Producer
- John Hume – Photography
- Tom Simon – Photography
- John Thompson – Design, Photography
