= Worlds in Collision (album) =

Studio album by Pere Ubu
- Released: May 7, 1991
- Genres: Post-punk, experimental rock
- Label: Fontana
- Producer: Gil Norton

Pere Ubu chronology
One Man Drives While the Other Man Screams (1989)	Worlds in Collision (1991)	Story of My Life (1993)

Singles from Worlds in Collision
- 1. "I Hear They Smoke the Barbecue" Released: 1990; 2. "Oh Catherine" Released: 1991

Professional ratings
Review scores
Source	Rating
AllMusic	4.5/5 stars
Chicago Tribune	4/4 stars
Christgau's Consumer Guide	(3-star Honorable Mention)
Entertainment Weekly	B+
Orlando Sentinel	4/5 stars
The Philadelphia Inquirer	4/4 stars
Rolling Stone	3/5 stars
The Rolling Stone Album Guide	3.5/5 stars
Spin Alternative Record Guide	5/10

Worlds in Collision is the eighth album by American rock group Pere Ubu. The album continues in the shift away from their more experimental early work to emphasize the relatively conventional pop found on their previous studio album, Cloudland. For this album, Eric Drew Feldman (Captain Beefheart, Snakefinger, the Residents, the Pixies) takes over from departing original member Allen Ravenstine on synthesizer, though Ravenstine makes some guest appearances.

== Track listing ==
All tracks composed by Pere Ubu (Eric Drew Feldman, Jim Jones, Scott Krauss, Tony Maimone and David Thomas); except where indicated

1. "Oh Catherine" – 2:54
2. "I Hear They Smoke the BBQ" – 4:08
3. "Turpentine!" – 2:40
4. "Goodnite Irene" – 4:10
5. "Mirror Man" – 3:32
6. "Cry Cry Cry" (Chris Cutler, Feldman, Jones, Krauss, Maimone, Thomas) – 2:45
7. "Worlds in Collision" – 3:43
8. "Life of Riley" – 2:34
9. "Over the Moon" – 3:08
10. "Don't Look Back" (Cutler, Feldman, Jones, Krauss, Maimone, Thomas) – 4:05
11. "Playback" – 3:30
12. "Nobody Knows" – 2:37
13. "Winter in the Firelands" (Cutler, Feldman, Jones, Krauss, Maimone, Thomas) – 3:09

== Personnel ==
Pere Ubu

- David Thomas - vocals
- Jim Jones - guitar, backing vocals
- Eric Drew Feldman - keyboards, computers, synthesizer
- Tony Maimone - bass
- Scott Krauss - drums

with guests:

- Allen Ravenstine - EML synthesizer on "Turpentine!", "Life of Riley", "Playback" and "Winter in the Firelands"
- Andy Redhead - drums
- John Kirkpatrick - melodeon on "Cry Cry Cry", "Worlds in Collision" and "Over the Moon"
- Susie Honeyman - violin on "Over The Moon"
- Al Clay - backing vocals on "Don't Look Back", "Goodnite Irene", "Nobody Knows", "Over the Moon" and "Worlds in Collision"
- Gil Norton - backing vocals
