= Apocalypse Now (album) =

Live album by Pere Ubu
- Released: August 24, 1999
- Recorded: December 7, 1991
- Venues: Schubas Tavern, Chicago
- Genres: Post-punk, experimental rock
- Label: Thirsty Ear

Pere Ubu chronology
Pennsylvania (1998)	Apocalypse Now (1999)	The Shape of Things (2000)

Professional ratings
Review scores
Source	Rating
Allmusic	4/5 stars
Pitchfork Media	(7.5/10)

Apocalypse Now is Pere Ubu's third live album, and their first to document a single performance. The show in question, recorded on December 7, 1991, at Schubas Tavern in Chicago, was performed semi-acoustically, with synth-man Eric Drew Feldman instead handling an upright piano, and Jim Jones playing an amplified (and occasionally heavily distorted) acoustic guitar.

== Track listing ==
1. "My Theory of Spontaneous Simultude" (Allen Ravenstine, Daved Hild, David Thomas, Garo Yellin, Tony Maimone) – 6:47
2. "Life of Riley" (Thomas, Eric Drew Feldman, Jim Jones, Scott Krauss, Maimone) – 3:08
3. "Wine Dark Sparks" (Chris Cutler, Thomas, Feldman, Jones, Krauss, Maimone) – 3:16
4. "Heaven" (Ravenstine, Thomas, Krauss, Tom Herman, Maimone) – 3:28
5. "Worlds in Collision" (Thomas, Feldman, Jones, Krauss, Maimone) – 2:49
6. "Cry Cry Cry" (Cutler, Thomas, Feldman, Jones, Krauss, Maimone) – 3:10
7. "Non-Alignment Pact/I Wanna Be Your Dog" (Ravenstine, Thomas, Krauss, Herman, Maimone/David Alexander, Iggy Pop, Ron Asheton, Scott Asheton) – 3:41
8. "Caligari's Mirror" (Ravenstine, Thomas, Krauss, Herman, Maimone) – 3:33
9. "Invisible Man" (Cutler, Thomas, Feldman, Jones, Krauss, Maimone) – 3:38
10. "We Have the Technology" (Ravenstine, Cutler, Thomas, Jones, Krauss, Maimone) – 3:10
11. "Humor Me" (Ravenstine, Thomas, Krauss, Herman, Maimone) – 4:18
12. "Busman's Honeymoon" (Ravenstine, Cutler, Thomas, Jones, Krauss, Maimone) – 3:20
13. "Oh Catherine" (Thomas, Feldman, Jones, Krauss, Maimone) – 4:24
14. "Misery Goats/Master of the Universe" (Ravenstine, Thomas, Mayo Thompson, Krauss, Maimone/Dave Brock, Nik Turner) – 3:49

== Personnel ==
Pere Ubu

- David Thomas - vocals, radio, swirl horn
- Jim Jones - acoustic guitar, rat pedal
- Eric Drew Feldman - honky-tonk upright piano
- Tony Maimone - acoustic guitar, electric bass
- Scott Krauss - drums, percussion

Technical

- Todd Petersen - engineer
- John Thompson - artwork, photography
