= Cloudland (album) =

Studio album by Pere Ubu
- Released: May 1989
- Recorded: June – September 1988
- Genre: Alternative rock, post-punk
- Label: Fontana
- Producer: Paul Hamann, Stephen Hague, Daniel Miller

Pere Ubu chronology
The Tenement Year (1988)	Cloudland (1989)	One Man Drives While the Other Man Screams (1989)

Cloudland is the seventh studio album by American rock band Pere Ubu. Released in May 1989, the album was produced by Stephen Hague. The single "Waiting for Mary", the video for which achieved some MTV exposure, netted Pere Ubu their only Billboard chart success to date, reaching number 6 on the Modern Rock Tracks chart. Cloudland is a village in north-western Georgia between Summerville and Chattanooga on a spur of Lookout Mountain. In the early 20th century, it was a summer getaway for Floridians.

After being out-of-print for several years, Cloudland was re-released on CD with bonus tracks in 2007.

== Critical reception ==
Professional ratings
Review scores
Source	Rating
AllMusic	4/5 stars
Chicago Sun-Times	4/4 stars
Chicago Tribune	3/4 stars
NME	7/10
The Philadelphia Inquirer	4/4 stars
Q	4/5 stars
Rolling Stone	4/5 stars
The Rolling Stone Album Guide	3.5/5 stars
Spin Alternative Record Guide	8/10
The Village Voice	A−

American magazine Stereo Review in its August 1989 issue called Cloudland "smart music for a mass audience" and placed the album in its "Best Recordings of the Month" section. Pete Clark of Hi-Fi News & Record Review left a lot of warm words on the album. He wrote: "Gems on this record will open the ears of anyone but a Flowerpot Man. Working within a fairly straightforward rock format, the Ubus bring more wit and panache to the business of making music than a dozen pop lamebrains." Martin Aston, reviewer of British music newspaper Music Week, was also satisfied. As per him: "Because avant-garage icons Pere Ubu have never considered writing an undeniable 'pop' type of album, Cloudland sounds as fresh, vital and impulsive as a debut and quite their best since 1978's Dub Housing."

== Track listing ==
All tracks composed by Pere Ubu (Chris Cutler, Jim Jones, Scott Krauss, Tony Maimone, Allen Ravenstine and David Thomas); except where indicated

1. "Breath" – 3:58
2. "Race the Sun" – 3:25
3. "Cry" – 2:33
4. "Why Go It Alone?" – 2:49
5. "Waiting for Mary" – 3:29
6. "Ice Cream Truck" – 2:48
7. "Bus Called Happiness" – 3:13
8. "Monday Night" – 2:15
9. "Love Love Love" (Tom Herman, Scott Krauss, Peter Laughner, Dave Taylor, David Thomas, Tim Wright) – 3:28
10. "Lost Nation Road" – 2:16
11. "Fire" – 3:45
12. "Nevada!" – 3:20
13. "The Wire" – 3:20
14. "Flat" – 2:23
15. "The Waltz" – 3:30
16. "Pushin'" – 2:27

== Personnel ==
Pere Ubu

- David Thomas – vocals
- Jim Jones – guitar, backing vocals
- Allen Ravenstine – EML synthesizers, backing vocals
- Tony Maimone – bass, backing vocals
- Chris Cutler – drums
- Scott Krauss – drums

Additional personnel

- Stephen Hague – keyboards
