= One Man Drives While the Other Man Screams =

Live album by Pere Ubu
- Released: 1989
- Genre: Rock
- Label: Rough Trade

Pere Ubu chronology
Cloudland (1989)	One Man Drives While the Other Man Screams (1989)	Worlds in Collision (1991)

Professional ratings
Review scores
Source	Rating
Allmusic	2/5 stars

One Man Drives While the Other Man Screams is Pere Ubu's second live album, covering the years 1978–1981 (dovetailing with their previous live release, 390° of Simulated Stereo, which covered 1976–1978, but containing no recordings from 1979).

The album contains live renditions of one non-album track; one from the first Pere Ubu album, The Modern Dance (incidentally a version of this track, ‘Street Waves’, also appears on 390° of Simulated Stereo); six songs from Dub Housing; one from New Picnic Time and four from The Art of Walking. The first six songs were recorded at London's Electric Ballroom in November 1978 and feature Tom Herman on guitar. Herman left the group in 1979 (he would return in 1995). Tracks 7–11 were recorded at The Mistake in Cleveland in July 1980, and feature Mayo Thompson on guitar in place of Herman, as do the last two tracks, recorded in Heidelberg, Germany in March 1981. One Man Drives... allows the listener to compare versions of the songs 'Small was Fast', 'Ubu Dance Party' (listed on the Dub Housing album as '(Pa) Ubu Dance Party') and 'Codex' with Thompson on guitar instead of Herman. Brett Milano of the Amherst Valley Advocate wrote in 1980 that Thompson 'has an intuitive sense of when to take off on spontaneous improvisation and when to hold everything together with some well-placed riffing.'

== Critical reception ==
Critics were mixed as to the quality and value of One Man Drives While Another Man Screams. Robert Lloyd wrote in the LA Weekly:

The record is, as it would have to be, first-rate, being a document of a first-rate band in the pink of performance, and offers the usual blips and beeps, burbs and chirps, splatches and screeches and indecipherable mutterings, but more of them, and of demeanour more unruly. Kicks butt, even as it messes with your head.

Greg Kot in the Chicago Tribune suggested of this album and its predecessor 390° of Simulated Stereo that they were 'perhaps the best place for a fledgling Ubu fan to start, for though the sound is crude, they both emphasize the rock aspect of the band’s “art-rock” sound.' However Grant Alden in the Seattle Rocket wrote that 'the sound is surprisingly impenetrable… I could live with the mud if the performances were as inspired as, say, John Cale’s Sabotage/Live, from the same period. They’re not. Ubu just doesn’t seem quite on during the shows excerpted here. The best songs are all represented but this collection does not do them justice.'

After remaining out of print for many years, the album was reissued in 2004. It is the first Pere Ubu album to be released only in CD format.

== Track listing ==
1. "Navvy" – 2:53
2. "Street Waves" – 4:16
3. "Heaven" – 3:09
4. "On the Surface" – 2:37
5. "Dub Housing" – 5:10
6. "Caligari's Mirror" – 3:58
7. "Small Was Fast" – 3:19
8. "Misery Goats" – 2:49
9. "Go" – 3:57
10. "Ubu Dance Party" – 4:32
11. "Birdies" – 3:06
12. "Rhapsody in Pink" – 5:21
13. "Codex" – 2:29

== Personnel ==
Pere Ubu

- David Thomas - vocals
- Mayo Thompson - guitar
- Tom Herman - guitar
- Allen Ravenstine - EML synthesizers
- Tony Maimone - bass guitar
- Scott Krauss - drums
