= Ray Gun Suitcase =

Studio album by Pere Ubu
- Released: August 19, 1995
- Genre: Experimental rock
- Label: Tim/Kerr
- Producer: David Thomas

Pere Ubu chronology
Story of My Life (1993)	Ray Gun Suitcase (1995)	Datapanik in Year Zero (1996)

David Thomas chronology
Blame the Messenger (1987)	Ray Gun Suitcase (1995)	Erewhon (1996)

Professional ratings
Review scores
Source	Rating
AllMusic	3/5 stars
Christgau's Consumer Guide	(3-star Honorable Mention)
Rolling Stone	4/5 stars

Ray Gun Suitcase is the tenth album by the American rock group Pere Ubu.

After a string of slickly produced, pop-oriented albums for major labels, Ray Gun Suitcase saw Pere Ubu back on an indie label and returning to the darker, more complex sonic landscape associated with their earlier work. Michele Temple (from drummer Scott Krauss' project Home & Garden) replaced Tony Maimone on bass guitar. Several songs were recorded by the line-up featuring David Thomas, Jim Jones, Temple and Krauss plus violist Garo Yellin of The Ordinaires. After Yellin couldn't commit to Pere Ubu full time, he was replaced by synth/theremin player Robert Wheeler (also previously in Home & Garden). Krauss then quit, citing his unhappiness with the band's direction; as the band was still hoping for him to come back, the album was recorded to a click track. Scott Benedict from The Vivians then recorded the drum parts over a final studio weekend "in an astonishing demonstration of musicianship", before quitting music altogether. For the subsequent tour in support of the album Steve Mehlman, Benedict's replacement in The Vivians, was asked to join Pere Ubu.

== Director's Cut ==
In 2005, to celebrate Pere Ubu's thirtieth anniversary, a "Director's Cut" was released with new mastering, alternative mixes, and two bonus tracks. David Thomas explains: "The point of doing a Director's Cut is to benefit from that older and wiser thing. I reviewed all alternate mixes from the session, sometimes discovering that an earlier mix turned out to be superior to the chosen mix. As well, 10 years later, we have access to improved mastering technology. Consequently, there is a greater clarity and cohesion to the Director's Cut. We are not going to make both versions available. The Director's Cut is the way it's supposed to be. Period."

1. "Folly of Youth" – 4:52
2. "Electricity" – 4:30
3. "Beach Boys" – 3:57
4. "Turquoise Fins" – 3:10
5. "Vacuum in My Head" – 4:21
6. "Memphis" – 4:04
7. "Three Things" – 4:49
8. "Horse" – 5:02
9. "Don't Worry" – 3:09
10. "Ray Gun Suitcase" – 3:47
11. "Surfer Girl" (Brian Wilson) – 2:13
12. "Red Sky" – 5:26
13. "Montana" – 5:58
14. "My Friend Is a Stooge for the Media Priests" – 3:07
15. "Down by the River II" – 3:52
16. "Memphis" (demo)* – 4:16
17. "Down by the River II" (demo)* – 3:49

* - Director's Cut only

== Personnel ==
Pere Ubu

- David Thomas - vocals, melodeon, musette, auto-cans, ray gun
- Jim Jones - guitar, keyboard bass, backing vocals, keyboards, spike, sleigh bells
- Robert Wheeler - EML synthesizers, Ensoniq EPS, theremin
- Michele Temple - bass guitar, slide bass, guitar, lute
- Scott Benedict - drums

with:

- Scott Krauss - drums on "Memphis", "Beach Boys", "Down By The River" & "Montana"
- Garo Yellin - electric cello on "Memphis", "Beach Boys", "Down By The River" & "Montana"
- Paul Hamann - bass guitar on "My Friend Is A Stooge"; swirl bells on "Vacuum In My Head"
