= The Tenement Year =

Studio album by Pere Ubu
- Released: March 28, 1988
- Recorded: November 9–30, 1987
- Studio: Suma Studios, Cleveland
- Genre: Alternative rock
- Length: 44:29
- Label: Fontana (UK); Enigma (US)
- Producer: Paul Hamann, Pere Ubu

Pere Ubu chronology
| Terminal Tower (1985) | The Tenement Year (1988) | Cloudland (1989) |

Professional ratings
Review scores
| Source | Rating |
|---|---|
| AllMusic | 4/5 stars |
| Chicago Sun-Times | 3.5/4 stars |
| NME | 10/10 |
| The Philadelphia Inquirer | 4/4 stars |
| Q | 4/5 stars |
| Record Mirror | 3 1/2/5 |
| Rolling Stone | 4/5 stars |
| The Rolling Stone Album Guide | 3.5/5 stars |
| Spin Alternative Record Guide | 7/10 |
| The Village Voice | A |

The Tenement Year is the sixth studio album by American rock band Pere Ubu, and their first album after reuniting following their 1982 break-up. 'Classic lineup' members Tony Maimone and Allen Ravenstine, along with fellow Cleveland scenester Jim Jones and Henry Cow percussionist Chris Cutler found themselves playing with David Thomas for his 1987 album Blame the Messenger, and, discovering they sounded much like Pere Ubu, began incorporating a few Ubu numbers while touring for that album. Eventually, an official reunion was pursued, original drummer Scott Krauss was contacted, and thus the new lineup was completed and the old mantle assumed. The Tenement Year found the group veering in a loose, freewheeling, and decidedly more pop-oriented direction than in the past, although the pop leanings would become even more pronounced on subsequent albums. The album is a farewell to their hometown of Cleveland.

After being out of print for many years, a reissue was announced in early 2007.

== Track listing ==
All tracks composed by Pere Ubu (Chris Cutler, Jim Jones, Scott Krauss, Tony Maimone, Allen Ravenstine and David Thomas)

1. "Something's Gotta Give" – 5:13
2. "George Had a Hat" – 4:02
3. "Talk to Me" – 3:28
4. "Busman's Honeymoon" – 4:35
5. "Say Goodbye" – 4:58
6. "Universal Vibration" – 2:43
7. "Miss You" – 4:21
8. "Dream the Moon" – 3:25
9. "Rhythm King" – 4:26
10. "The Hollow Earth" – 4:15
11. "We Have the Technology" – 3:03

== Personnel ==
Pere Ubu

- David Thomas – lead vocals, trombone, spike
- Jim Jones – electric guitar
- Allen Ravenstine – EML synthesizer, saxophone, backing vocals
- Tony Maimone – bass
- Chris Cutler – drums, percussion, "noises off"
- Scott Krauss – drum kit

Additional personnel

- John Kirkpatrick – melodeon on "Miss You" and "Busman's Honeymoon"
