= Lady from Shanghai (album) =

Studio album by Pere Ubu
- Released: January 7, 2013
- Studio: Suma (Painesville, Ohio); Nuke India Now (Hove); Urban Iguana (New York City)
- Genre: Art rock
- Length: 51:00
- Label: Fire
- Producer: David Thomas

Pere Ubu chronology
Long Live Père Ubu! (2009)	Lady from Shanghai (2013)	Carnival of Souls (2014)

Professional ratings
Aggregate scores
Source	Rating
Metacritic	76/100
Review scores
Source	Rating
AllMusic	3.5/5 stars
The Guardian	3/5 stars
PopMatters	7/10

Lady from Shanghai is the fourteenth studio album by American band Pere Ubu. It was produced by Pere Ubu's front-man David Thomas and it was released on January 7, 2013, on Fire Records label.

== Track listing ==
All tracks are written by Pere Ubu.

No.	Title	Length
1.	"Thanks"	2:14
2.	"Free White"	2:29
3.	"Feuksley Ma'am, the Hearing"	5:11
4.	"Mandy"	7:14
5.	"And Then Nothing Happened"	4:14
6.	"Musicians Are Scum"	3:33
7.	"Another One"	2:47
8.	"The Road Trip of Bipasha Ahmed"	4:13
9.	"Lampshade Man"	6:20
10.	"414 Seconds"	6:48
11.	"The Carpenter Sun"	5:57

== Personnel ==
Pere Ubu

- David Thomas − vocals, piano, organ, Xiosynth, Korg iMS-20, Monotron, Roland 303 synthesizers
- Keith Moliné − guitar, bass
- Robert Wheeler − EML, Grendel Drone Commander, Korg iMS-20, SNM Cacophoner II synthesizers
- Gagarin (Graham Dowdall) − piano, organ, digital electronica
- Michele Temple − bass, guitar, bells
- Steve Mehlman − drums, organ, vocals

with:

- Darryl Boon − clarinet

Technical

- Paul Hamann – engineer
- Alexandre Horne, John Thompson – front cover
