= Story of My Life (album) =

Studio album by Pere Ubu
- Released: April 1993
- Genre: Post-punk, experimental rock
- Label: Fontana, Imago
- Producer: Al Clay

Pere Ubu chronology
Worlds in Collision (1991)	Story of My Life (1993)	Ray Gun Suitcase (1995)

Professional ratings
Review scores
Source	Rating
AllMusic	4/5 stars
Chicago Tribune	3.5/4 stars
Christgau's Consumer Guide	(1-star Honorable Mention)
Entertainment Weekly	A−
Rolling Stone	4/5 stars

Story of My Life is Pere Ubu's ninth studio album. Eric Drew Feldman left the band prior to recording, reducing Ubu to a quartet. Prior to touring on this album longtime bassist Tony Maimone left as well. This is the final release to feature both Maimone and founding drummer Scott Krauss. According to a conversation between David Thomas and Frank Black included on the b-side of the "Kathleen" single, the album's working title was Johnny Rivers Live At The Whiskey A Go Go.

Though out of print for many years, a reissue was announced in early 2007.

"Come Home" features prominently in a bar fight scene in Kalifornia (1993), starring Brad Pitt as a psychopathic serial killer.

"Wasted" appears in Sleep with Me (1994), starring Meg Tilly, Eric Stoltz and Craig Sheffer.

== Track listing ==
1. "Wasted" – 2:37
2. "Come Home" – 4:49
3. "Louisiana Train Wreck" – 3:20
4. "Fedora Satellite II" – 3:26
5. "Heartbreak Garage" – 3:52
6. "Postcard" – 2:49
7. "Kathleen" – 4:24
8. "Honey Moon" – 2:54
9. "Sleep Walk" – 4:23
10. "The Story of My Life" – 4:06
11. "Last Will & Testament" – 3:48

== Personnel ==
Pere Ubu

- David Thomas - vocals, melodeon, guitar on "Postcard"
- Jim Jones - guitar, Hammond B3, backing vox, keyboard
- Tony Maimone - bass, EML synthesizer
- Scott Krauss - drums, percussion, keyboard, shortwave

with:

- Al Clay - vox calliope, digital keyboard, backing vocals, guitar on "Postcard"
