= Pennsylvania (album) =

Studio album by Pere Ubu
- Released: March 2, 1998
- Recorded: 1998
- Studio: Suma (Painesville, Ohio)
- Genre: Post-punk, experimental rock
- Label: Tim/Kerr; Cooking Vinyl
- Producer: David Thomas

Pere Ubu chronology
Datapanik in the Year Zero (1996)	Pennsylvania (1998)	Apocalypse Now (1999)

Professional ratings
Review scores
Source	Rating
AllMusic	4/5 stars
Robert Christgau	(dud)
Record Collector	4/5 stars

Pennsylvania is the eleventh album by the American band Pere Ubu, released in 1998.

== Background ==
Pennsylvania was the first album since 1979's New Picnic Time to feature guitarist Tom Herman, who came back to replace Jim Jones after the latter retired from touring due to health reasons (although Jones still remained involved as a studio contributor). It was also the first to feature drummer Steve Mehlman.

The album has been described as a loose concept album about geography, travel, and road trips. According to David Thomas, "Pennsylvania is the space between where you are and where you're going and the roads are no good and the speed limit is stupidly low".

The band considered various options to obfuscate the album track listing on CD (and prevent listeners to program their own sequence), such as indexing the album as two long tracks ("Side A" and "Side B") or splitting it evenly into tracks 3:22 long regardless of actual song lengths. The finalized version was indexed normally but included several hidden tracks following the last song "Wheelhouse" after a period of silence.

== Critical reception ==
The Hartford Courant thought that "in many ways, the band is more focused than ever on its new Pennsylvania, churning up compelling guitar tracks while Thomas sings or often speaks over the top of tracks: weary, wary, compelling in his observations." The Chicago Tribune determined that "though a little less hook-oriented than its predecessor, Pennsylvania finds the band cloaking David Thomas' delirious visions of America in a claustrophobic yet compelling cubist blues-rock that could have emanated from no other band in the world."

Stereo Review opined that "the acoustic/slide-guitar mix in 'SAD.TXT' is downright Zeppelinesque, and in 'Woolie Bullie' ... Ubu locks into a monolithic, pounding riff that may be the dumbest thing these folks have ever played, and it sounds great."

Reviewing a 2021 remix of the album, Record Collector wrote that Herman's "presence is dynamic from the chugging chords of opener 'Woolie Bullie' (most definitely not the old rock’n’roll song) through 'Muddy Waters' (certainly not blues) creating high-energy fragments of nearly-pop."

== Reissues ==
In 2005, to celebrate Pere Ubu's 30th Anniversary, a "Director's Cut" of Pennsylvania was released through Cooking Vinyl. It was remastered and featured alternate mixes and/or edits of "Monday Morning", "Woolie Bullie", "Urban Lifestyle", "Muddy Waters", and "Drive". Previously hidden tracks "Fly's Eye" (remix) and "My Name Is..." were unhidden ("My Name Is..." was also shortened by several minutes) and added as bonus tracks alongside the outtake "Dr. Sax" and a live version of "SAD.TXT".

In 2021 the album was completely remixed and remastered for the first ever vinyl release on Fire Records. Some songs were shortened or edited to allow for the album to fit on one vinyl disk. This version of Pennsylvania was also released on CD and is the one widely available on digital streaming services.

== Track listing ==
All tracks composed by Pere Ubu

=== Original release ===
1. "Woolie Bullie" – 3:41
2. "Highwaterville" – 1:36
3. "SAD.TXT" – 3:26
4. "Urban Lifestyle" – 2:55
5. "Silent Spring" – 4:15
6. "Mr Wheeler" – 4:14
7. "Muddy Waters" – 3:49
8. "Slow" – 1:07
9. "Drive" – 4:42
10. "Indiangiver" – 0:58
11. "Monday Morning" – 3:32
12. "Perfume" – 4:31
13. "Fly's Eye" – 2:39
14. "The Duke's Saharan Ambitions" – 4:56
15. "Wheelhouse" – 23:25
  - song's actual length is 5:03; contains three hidden tracks: an untitled, nearly inaudible voice loop (6:04–7:04), "Fly's Eye" (remix) (starts at 8:02) and "My Name Is..." (starts at 10:48)

=== 2005 version ("Director's Cut") ===
1. "Woolie Bullie" * – 3:41
2. "Highwaterville" – 1:36
3. "SAD.TXT" – 3:26
4. "Urban Lifestyle" * – 2:55
5. "Silent Spring" – 4:15
6. "Mr Wheeler" * – 3:35
7. "Muddy Waters" * – 3:26
8. "Slow" – 1:07
9. "Drive" * – 4:17
10. "Indiangiver" – 0:58
11. "Monday Morning" * – 3:32
12. "Perfume" – 4:31
13. "Fly's Eye" – 2:39
14. "The Duke's Saharan Ambitions" – 4:56
15. "Wheelhouse" – 5:03
16. "Fly's Eye" (remix) – 2:44
17. "SAD.TXT" (live) – 3:48
18. "My Name Is..." (live) – 7:30
19. "Dr Sax" (out-take) – 5:12

(*) alternate mix

=== 2021 version ===
1. "Woolie Bullie" – 2:51
2. "Highwaterville" – 1:29
3. "SAD.TXT" – 3:18
4. "Urban Lifestyle" – 2:45
5. "Silent Spring" – 2:33
6. "Mr Wheeler" – 3:30
7. "Muddy Waters" – 3:20
8. "Drive" – 4:36
9. "Indiangiver" – 0:49
10. "Monday Morning" – 2:55
11. "Perfume" – 4:17
12. "Fly's Eye" – 2:37
13. "Wheelhouse" – 5:00

== Personnel ==
Pere Ubu

- David Thomas – vocals, organ ("Woolie Bullie"), virtual voices ("My Name Is...")
- Tom Herman – guitar, bass, tack piano, snare percussion
- Jim Jones – guitar, bass, organ
- Robert Wheeler – EML & digital synthesizers, theremin, organ
- Michele Temple – bass, guitar, organ, piano
- Steve Mehlman – drums, percussion

Technical

- David Thomas – production, remastering (2005 version), remixing (2021 version)
- Paul Hamann – engineer, remastering (2005 version)
- John Thompson – design
- Brian Pyle – remastering (2021 version)
