= Long Live Père Ubu! =

Studio album by Pere Ubu with Sarah Jane Morris
- Released: September 15, 2009
- Genre: Punk rock
- Label: Hearpen Records

Pere Ubu with Sarah Jane Morris chronology
Why I Hate Women (2006)	Long Live Père Ubu! (2009)	Lady from Shanghai (2013)

Long Live Père Ubu! is an album by the American band Pere Ubu, released on September 15, 2009. It is a soundtrack to a musical adaptation of the play from which the band took its name. The band performed its adaptation at (Le) Poisson Rouge. David Thomas referred to Long Live Père Ubu! as the first "true" punk album to be released in 30 years.

Sarah Jane Morris played the part of Ubu's wife.

== Critical reception ==
Professional ratings
Review scores
Source	Rating
Clash	8/10
Record Collector	4/5 stars
Spin	6/10 stars
PopMatters	7/10

The Independent wrote: "Reflecting the original play's deliberately repugnant manner, the accompaniment is full of martial, rat-a-tat drum fusillades and pompous marches, synth whines, washes of white noise and colossal bouts of belching, perfectly embodying the childish antagonism of Jarry's irrepressible urge to 'epater la bourgeoisie.'"

Record Collector called the album "a hall-of-mirrors audio play with a linear narrative, scronking, squalling rhythms and melodic snippets undulating round a pulsating soundscape."

== Track listing ==
1. "Ubu Overture" - 2:42
2. "Song of the Grocery Police" - 1:46
3. "Banquet of the Butchers" - 2:55
4. "March of Greed" - 3:34
5. "Less Said the Better" - 2:31
6. "Big Sombrero (Love Theme)" - 4:06
7. "Bring Me the Head" - 3:39
8. "Road to Reason" - 3:55
9. "Slowly I Turn" - 4:25
10. "Watching the Pigeons" - 3:21
11. "The Story So Far" - 7:57
12. "Snowy Livonia" - 1:20
13. "Elsinore & Beyond" - 1:35

== Personnel ==
Pere Ubu

- David Thomas - vocals
- Sarah Jane Morris - vocals
- Keith Moliné - guitar, vocals
- Michele Temple - bass, lead vocals
- Steve Mehlman - drums, percussion, vocals
