= Hugo-Ugo =

Soviet/Russian post-punk band

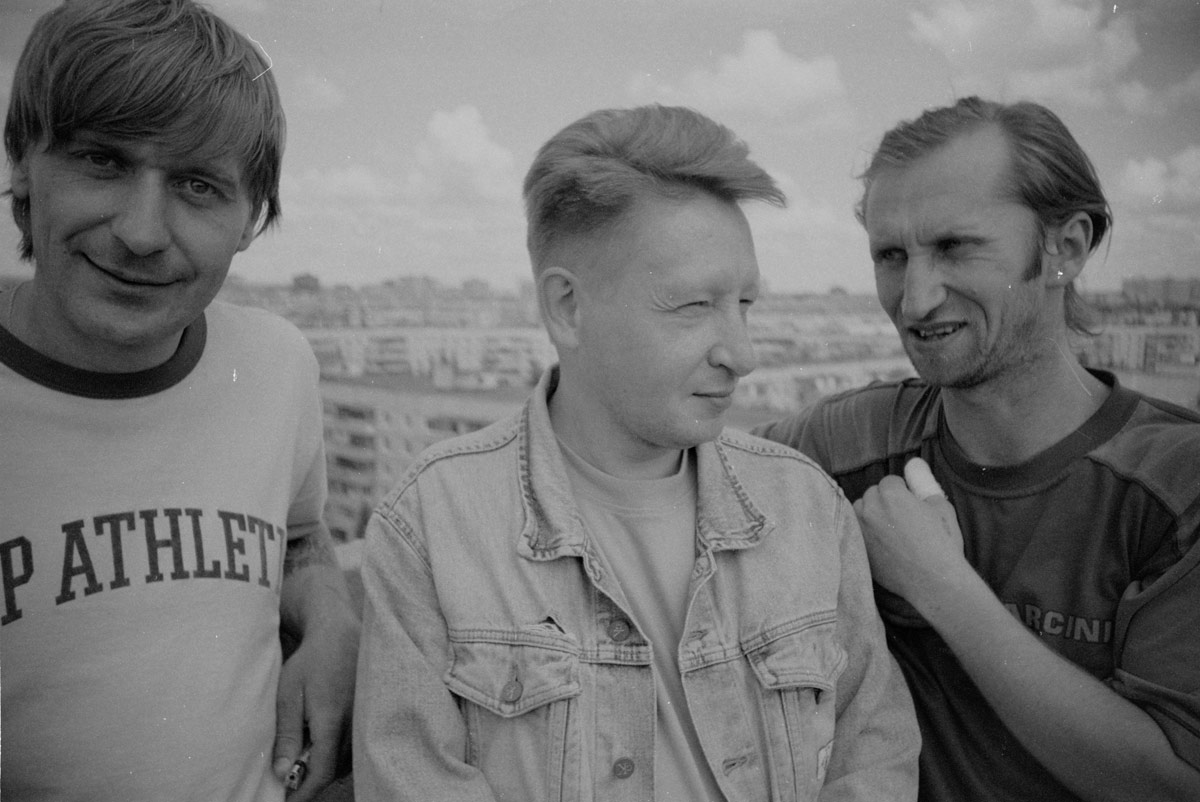

Background information
- Origin: Tolyatti, USSR
- Genres: Post-punk
- Years active: 1990–2007

Hugo-Ugo (Russian: Хуго-Уго) is a Soviet/Russian post-punk band from Tolyatti that was active from 1990 to 2007.

== History ==
The band was founded in May 1990 by artists Vladimir Krasnoshchyokov and Alexei Kondratiev. At first, the musical group did not have its own name. In July of the same year, guitarist Maksim Kotomtsev joined the band.

The name Hugo-Ugo was invented by the artist Alexei Alyapkin. According to him, it was a tribute to the American band Pere Ubu.

== The first line-up ==
- Vladimir Krasnoshchyokov – vocals, guitar
- Alexei Kondratiev – vocals, percussion, children's harmonica
- Yuri Paliy – percussion
- Alla Sorokina – flute

== Official albums ==
Year	Original title	Translated title
1990	Ритм-н-блюз	Rhythm and blues
1990	Два солнца, две луны	Two suns, two moons
1991	Дельтаплан	Hang glider
1991	Мотороллер	Scooter
1991	Непростительно для королевы	Unforgivable for a queen
1992	Концерт в Жигулёвском	Concert in Zhigulyovsk
1992	Мне так страшно	I'm so scared
1992	Я не понял ничего	I didn't understand anything
2008	67 мм	67 mm
