= St. Arkansas =

Studio album by Pere Ubu
- Released: 2002
- Studio: Suma (Painesville, Ohio)
- Genre: Post-punk, experimental rock
- Label: Glitterhouse; SpinART
- Producer: David Thomas

Pere Ubu chronology
| The Shape of Things (2000) | St. Arkansas (2002) | Why I Hate Women (2006) |

David Thomas chronology
| Surf's Up! (2001) | St. Arkansas (2002) | 18 Monkeys on a Dead Man's Chest (2002) |

Professional ratings
Review scores
| Source | Rating |
|---|---|
| AllMusic | 4/5 stars |
| Robert Christgau | (2-star Honorable Mention) |
| The Encyclopedia of Popular Music | 3/5 stars |
| The Guardian | 4/5 stars |
| Pitchfork | 8.5/10 |

St. Arkansas is the 12th studio album by Pere Ubu, released in 2002.

== Critical reception ==
The A.V. Club wrote that the album "is one of Pere Ubu's best works, displaying the kind of intelligence and imagination that gives the avant-garde a good name." AllMusic wrote that the band's "lyrical and musical creativity is undiminished by time." Pitchfork called the album "more subdued and less rock-oriented, relying more on beat-style spoken-word storytelling and found sound." The East Bay Express called it "consistently fine" and "full of spidery electric guitar, wry, deadpan singing, and loping, haunted, and haunting rhythms." CMJ New Music Monthly wrote that the band "remains a challenging but rewarding listen, uncannily able to move forward while preserving its unmistakable vibe."

== Track listing ==
1. "The Fevered Dream of Hernando DeSoto" – 2:45
2. "Slow Walking Daddy" – 4:52
3. "Michele" – 3:11
4. "333" – 3:59
5. "Hell" – 5:12
6. "Lisbon" – 3:30
7. "Steve" – 2:48
8. "Phone Home Jonah" – 2:39
9. "Where's the Truth" – 3:25
10. "Dark" – 9:16

== Personnel ==
Pere Ubu

- David Thomas - vocals
- Tom Herman - guitar, organ, backing vocals
- Robert Wheeler - EML synthesizer, theremin, piano
- Michele Temple - bass, piano, organ
- Steve Mehlman - drums, organ

with:

- Jim Jones - organ, guitar

Technical

- Paul Hamann - engineer
- John Thompson - design
