= 20 Years in a Montana Missile Silo =

Studio album by Pere Ubu
- Released: September 29, 2017
- Studio: Suma Recording (Painesville, Ohio)
- Length: 33:47
- Label: Cherry Red
- Producer: David Thomas

Pere Ubu chronology
Carnival of Souls (2014)	20 Years in a Montana Missile Silo (2017)	The Long Goodbye (2019)

Professional ratings
Aggregate scores
Source	Rating
Metacritic	78/100
Review scores
Source	Rating
AllMusic	4/5 stars
PopMatters	7/10
Record Collector	3/5 stars
Under the Radar	7/10

20 Years in a Montana Missile Solo is the sixteenth studio album by American band Pere Ubu. It was released on September 29, 2017, through Cherry Red Records. The album was dedicated to Paul Hamann, the owner and engineer of Suma Recording, who died on September 14, 2017.

== Track listing ==
All tracks composed by Pere Ubu:

No.	Title	Length
1.	"Monkey Bizness"	2:18
2.	"Funk 49"	1:58
3.	"Prison of the Senses"	2:11
4.	"Toe to Toe"	1:34
5.	"The Healer"	3:18
6.	"Swampland"	1:52
7.	"Plan from Frag 9"	3:19
8.	"Howl"	3:00
9.	"Red Eye Blues"	1:52
10.	"Walking Again"	4:35
11.	"I Can Still See"	4:10
12.	"Cold Sweat"	3:40

== Personnel ==
Pere Ubu

- David Thomas - vocals
- Gary Siperko, Keith Moliné - guitar
- Kristof Hahn - steel guitar
- Michele Temple - bass
- Robert Wheeler - analog synthesizers, Theremin
- Steve Mehlman - drums
- Darryl Boon - clarinet
- Roshi Nasehi - additional vocals
