= The Modern Dance =

Studio album by Pere Ubu
- Released: February 1978
- Recorded: October 1976 – November 1977
- Studios: CRC; Suma (Painesville, Ohio)
- Genres: Art punk; experimental rock; avant-garage
- Length: 36:20
- Label: Blank
- Producers: Pere Ubu; Ken Hamann

Pere Ubu chronology
The Modern Dance (1978)	Dub Housing (1978)

Singles from The Modern Dance
- 1. "Street Waves" / "My Dark Ages" Released: October 12, 1976; 2. "The Modern Dance" / "Heaven" Released: August 25, 1977

The Modern Dance is the debut album by the American rock band Pere Ubu. It was released in February 1978 through Blank Records. Although commercially unsuccessful, it drew critical acclaim upon release and was later regarded as influential in the development of post-punk.

The album was ranked number 11 by NME on their list of "Best Albums of 1978", number 14 on Spin magazine's list of the "50 Most Essential Punk Records", number 31 by Fact in "The 100 Best Albums of the 1970s", number 34 in Mojo's "Top 50 Punk Albums" and number 63 on Uncut's "The 100 Greatest Debut Albums". It appears in the 2005 book 1001 Albums You Must Hear Before You Die.

In 2005, a 5.1-surround-sound version was released as the DVD-Audio side of a DualDisc.

== Background ==
On October 12, 1976, Pere Ubu released "Street Waves" as a single backed with "My Dark Ages". When Cliff Burnstein, the A&R man for Mercury Records in Chicago came across the single, he told the band that Mercury was not the right fit for them. But when Chrysalis Records in the UK reached out to Pere Ubu, Burnstein quickly recontacted the band; he proposed they sign with a new Mercury imprint he was forming: Blank Records. By early 1977, Pere Ubu performed their first gigs outside Cleveland: New York's CBGB and Max's Kansas City, where they played what would appear on their debut album.

The Modern Dance was released in February 1978 through Blank Records. The release was a month later than planned, because the record label had to change its name from Dip Records, which was in use by an evangelist.

To promote the album, an American tour with labelmates the Suicide Commandos was scheduled to begin on February 18, 1978, with a show in Cleveland promoted by Johnny Dromette. Drummer Scott Krauss temporarily left the group for the first of the three times he would do so over the decades, and was briefly replaced by Anton Fier of the Feelies, though Krauss rejoined two weeks later. Fier would rejoin the band years later on Song of the Bailing Man.

== Music ==
The music drew influences from the avant-garde, garage rock, musique concrète, performance art, and the Rust Belt of the American Midwest. The album's cover art, and the track "Chinese Radiation", were inspired by Maoism and Chinese nuclear weapons testing. David Thomas said:

It was said that Cleveland had the highest population of Maoists outside of China, an urban myth probably but that was the talk...When China tested its A-bombs, the fallout traveled in the high atmosphere to finally descend...on Cleveland.

"Life Stinks" was written by former guitarist Peter Laughner and previously performed live by Rocket from the Tombs, while "Humor Me" was written in response to his death, as a play on his last name, "Laugh-". "Street Waves" was inspired by a stack of used tires on Detroit Avenue. The track "The Modern Dance" featured field recordings made by synthesist Allen Ravenstine in Downtown Cleveland; an earlier version of the song was later released as "untitled" on the 1978 EP Datapanik in the Year Zero. Ravenstine said "Sentimental Journey" was a take on the 1945 Doris Day song of the same name, with the impromptu sounds of breaking glass bottles acting as a harsh and angry juxtaposition to the suburban lifestyle evoked by the original song.

== Recording and production ==
Pere Ubu recorded most of their debut album in November 1977 at Suma Recording with engineer Ken Hamann, who would become a longtime collaborator of the band. Burnstein financed the sessions.

During the recording sessions, executives mistook Ravenstine's EML synthesizer for a technical error or accidental noise bleed. They were going to discard the recordings until the band assured them that it was exactly how they wanted the album to sound. Hamann detailed the recording process of the album in a 1999 interview with Tape Op:

[...] mostly close mic'd, with a pair of overheads. Snare usually was either from the top or the bottom; the bottom was good. The bass drum, the front was usually open and the mic was in the drum. And the toms frequently we mic'd from underneath. That's the floor tom. The other toms we might have done micing from the top. Generally speaking, the bottoms of the drums were all removed. It removed unwanted resonances, gave them a tighter sound. He most often used Neumann KM-56s on the toms and snare and as overheads, with a Beyer dynamic microphone on the kick drum. Neumann U-47s were common on bass and guitar amps. Allen Ravenstine's EML synthesizer went direct. I was quite taken by how he was able to provide exactly the right sound that was needed.

Some songs were recorded in October 1976 and January, August, and November 1977, while the band was touring. "Street Waves" and "The Modern Dance" were released as singles ahead of the album. Ravenstine and Thomas described the songs as being already written and easy to record. Hamann detailed the recording of the album's penultimate track, "Sentimental Journey" which featured sounds of breaking glass:

We have a huge, stone fireplace at one end of the studio-it's about 15 feet wide. They asked if we could do it. We said, 'Sure, why not, as long as you don't hurt yourself.' That was done as an overdub. At that time, we had 24 tracks, so we had the tracks to spare.

The original single mix of the track "The Modern Dance" featured a repetitive doll squeak on the rhythm track, which was mixed out and replaced with a railroad spike. This was later rectified on the Pere Ubu compilation album Elistism For The People 1975-1978 released in 2015.

David Thomas described the album as being a collection of standalone songs recorded over a period of time rather than a set of conceptual and interconnected tracks like later Pere Ubu albums, stating "If you’re one of these people who thinks The Modern Dance is the be-all and end-all of Pere Ubu, then you could say [imitating the voice of an annoying person] ‘Oh, well, it’s because it’s before David made everything a concept".

== Critical reception and legacy ==
1978 professional reviews
Review scores
Source	Rating
Christgau's Record Guide	B+
Record Mirror	5/5 stars

=== Contemporary reviews ===
In 1978, Robert Christgau reviewed the album for The Village Voice, writing: "even though there's too much Radio Ethiopia and not enough 'Redondo Beach,'" he would be "listening through the failed stuff—the highs are worth it." In Christgau's Record Guide: Rock Albums of the Seventies (1981), he reaffirmed that "the highs are worth it, and the failed stuff ain't bad" in his revised review. Ken Tucker, writing in Rolling Stone, called it vivid and exhilarating, even if "harsh and willfully ugly".

On March 11, 1978, Paul Rambali reviewed the album for NME, writing: "although Ubu aren't going to bust charts, break hearts and save rock 'n' roll, their mutant jack-hammer sound isn't as impenetrable as such descriptions suggest. Sometimes, even, it's almost friendly". Writer Ian Birch of Melody Maker on March 18, 1978, stated, "It's a devastating debut...this album has struck me with a vengeance. Because it delivers such a powerful, complex and open-ended punch, it's almost impossible at such an early stage to explain why or how in full detail."

On November 2, 1978, Jon Savage reviewed the album for Sounds magazine, writing: "Uh-oh, this is getting frustrating, trying to tell you how good this is - black and white is an inadequate substitute for the impact heard ... This is a brilliant debut. Granted it lacks the superficial accessibility of lesser works, but this time around the aroma lingers. This is built to last! Ubu's world is rarely comfortable, full of the space beyond the electric light and what it does to people, but always direct and unwavering. And courageous."

=== Retrospective assessment ===
Retrospective professional reviews
Review scores
Source	Rating
Christgau's Record Guide	A−
AllMusic	4.5/5 stars
Encyclopedia of Popular Music	5/5 stars
The Independent	5/5 stars
Mojo	4/5 stars
New Musical Express	10/10
Q	4/5 stars
The Rolling Stone Album Guide	4/5 stars
Spin Alternative Record Guide	10/10
Uncut	5/5 stars

The Modern Dance has been described as "a classic slice of art-punk" and the "signature sound of the avant-garage: art rock, punk rock, and garage rock mixing together joyously and fearlessly" by John Dougan of AllMusic. The album was also described as experimental rock by The Quietus' Brian Coney. He argued that it might have been the "genesis point" of the post-punk genre. While David Thomas was lauded for his "yelping vocals" by Record Collector.

David Stubbs of Uncut reviewed the album in August 2006, stating: "This is a far more cerebral, imperishable proposition than a mere local cry of urban discontent. The Eraserhead-style sad-clown persona of singer David Thomas, Tom Herman's nerve-shredding slide guitars and Ravenstine's abstract electronics combine to form a rock music as visceral and essential as the Stooges, yet which reaches parts of the brain untouched by their peers, predecessors or successors... An album that's only gotten more awesome with age."

The album was ranked number 11 by NME on their list of "Best Albums of 1978", number 14 on Spin magazine's list of the "50 Most Essential Punk Records", number 31 by Fact in "The 100 Best Albums of the 1970s", number 34 in Mojo's "Top 50 Punk Albums", and number 63 on Uncut's "The 100 Greatest Debut Albums".

Additionally, The Guardian stated, "[...] had this son of a literary professor stopped at The Modern Dance, he would have already sealed his legacy as one of rock’s great outsider innovator-pioneers."

== Track listing ==
All tracks are written by Pere Ubu (David Thomas, Tom Herman, Allen Ravenstine, Tony Maimone and Scott Krauss), except where noted.

No.	Title	Writer(s)	Length
1.	"Non-Alignment Pact"		3:18
2.	"The Modern Dance"		3:28
3.	"Laughing"		4:35
4.	"Street Waves"		3:04
5.	"Chinese Radiation"		3:27
6.	"Life Stinks"	Peter Laughner	1:52
7.	"Real World"		3:59
8.	"Over My Head"		3:48
9.	"Sentimental Journey"		6:05
10.	"Humor Me"		2:44
Total length:			36:37

== Legacy ==
Although commercially unsuccessful, The Modern Dance drew critical acclaim upon release and was later regarded as influential in the development of post-punk. British magazine Record Collector argued though Pere Ubu "preceded punk", their albums The Modern Dance and Dub Housing showcased "why they were bound up with the post-punk scene, having an apparent commonality with groups like Talking Heads and Joy Division, whose sound they preceded on early singles such as 1976's My Dark Ages."

In 2005, the album appeared in the book 1001 Albums You Must Hear Before You Die."

In 2023, Orchestral Manoeuvres in the Dark referenced The Modern Dance in the title track of their album Bauhaus Staircase.

== Personnel ==
Pere Ubu

- David Thomas – vocals, musette, percussion, production
- Tom Herman – guitar, backing vocals, production
- Allen Ravenstine – EML 101 and 200 analog synthesizers, saxophone, tapes, production
- Tony Maimone – bass, piano, backing vocals, production
- Scott Krauss – drums, production

Technical

- Steven Wallis Taylor – sleeve artwork
- Ken Hamann – engineering, production
- Mike Bishop – engineering assistance
- Paul Hamann – engineering assistance
- Mik Mellen – sleeve photography

== Release history ==
Year of release	Place of Release	Format	Label
1978	United States	Vinyl LP	Blank
1981	United Kingdom	Vinyl LP	Rough Trade
1988	United Kingdom	Vinyl LP	Fontana
1988	Germany	CD	Fontana
1998	United Kingdom	CD	Cooking Vinyl
1998	United States	CD	DGC
1999	Italy	Vinyl LP	Get Back
2005	Europe	DualDisc	Silverline
2007	United States	Vinyl LP	Blank
2008	United Kingdom	CD	Cooking Vinyl
2015	United Kingdom & United States	CD and Vinyl LP	Fire Records (UK)
