= Why I Hate Women =

Studio album by Pere Ubu
- Released: September 19, 2006
- Studio: Suma (Painesville, Ohio)
- Genre: Experimental rock
- Label: Smog Veil; Glitterhouse
- Producer: David Thomas

Pere Ubu chronology
| St. Arkansas (2002) | Why I Hate Women (2006) | Long Live Père Ubu! (2009) |

Professional ratings
Review scores
| Source | Rating |
|---|---|
| AllMusic | 3/5 stars |
| The Austin Chronicle | 3/5 stars |
| Robert Christgau | (dud) |
| PopMatters | 7/10 |

Why I Hate Women is the 13th studio album by Pere Ubu, released in 2006. Keith Moliné stepped in for departed longtime guitarist Tom Herman, making this the first Pere Ubu studio album not to feature any of the group's founders (except for David Thomas) either as members or as guests. Explaining the title, Thomas claimed that Why I Hate Women is a tribute to an imaginary book that Jim Thompson could have written.

== Production ==
The album's lyrics were inspired by Thomas's love of noir detective fiction.

Why I Remix Women, a remix of the album, was made available via mail order and at the band's concerts.

David Thomas remixed the album in 2021, retitled it Why I Luv Women (with the word "Luv" covering the word "Hate" in the style of a red, off-kilter sticker) and first reissued this version as part of the box set Nuke The Whales 2006-2014 in April 2022 through Fire Records.

== Critical reception ==
AllMusic wrote that the album "opens with a powerful dose of staccato psychodrama, 'Two Girls (One Bar),' and closes with arguably the closest thing to a boogie the band has ever recorded, the playfully loping 'Texas Overture' which offers a joyous aural travelog (largely culinary) through 'the land of the free.'" Exclaim! wrote that with Thomas's voice "contorting over tense, treble-loaded guitars, drums and squealing electronic devices, there's a lot of chaos here; however, it's controlled chaos, where melodies and harmonies do in fact exist." The Dallas Observer wrote that it "fits comfortably alongside the band's '90s releases, proving that even post-punkers can age gracefully and persevere, while still making music of a rare humor, depth and significance." The Cleveland Scene wrote that the album "spews 11 tunes of arcane lyrics and dense music."

== Track listing ==
All tracks composed by Pere Ubu

1. "Two Girls (One Bar)" – 2:28
2. "Babylonian Warehouses" – 4:27
3. "Blue Velvet" – 5:51
4. "Caroleen" – 4:21
5. "Flames Over Nebraska" – 2:07
6. "Love Song" – 6:08
7. "Mona" – 2:47
8. "My Boyfriend's Back" – 0:57
9. "Stolen Cadillac" – 6:12
10. "Synth Farm" – 3:02
11. "Texas Overture" – 6:12

== Personnel ==
Pere Ubu

- David Thomas - vocals
- Keith Moliné - guitar, backing vocals, bass
- Robert Wheeler - EML synthesizer, theremin
- Michele Temple - bass, lead vocals
- Steve Mehlman - drums, clave, percussion

with:

- Rodolphe Burger - stylophone on "Texas Overture"
- Robert Kidney - lead guitar on "Love Song"
- Jack Kidney - harp on "Blue Velvet" and tenor saxophone on "Synth Farm"
- Andy Diagram - trumpet on "Mona"

Technical

- Paul Hamann - engineer
- John Thompson, Mimi Thompson - design
