= 30 Seconds Over Tokyo (song) =

Single by Pere Ubu
- B-side: "Heart of Darkness"
- Released: December 1975
- Recorded: September 28 – October 1, 1975
- Studio: Audio Recording, Cleveland, Ohio
- Genre: Art rock; proto-punk; experimental rock
- Length: 6:21
- Label: Hearthan
- Songwriters: David Thomas; Peter Laughner; Gene O'Connor
- Producers: Pere Ubu; Bill Cavanaugh

Pere Ubu singles chronology
| "30 Seconds Over Tokyo" (1975) | "Final Solution" (1976) |

"30 Seconds Over Tokyo" is the debut single by the American rock band Pere Ubu, released in December 1975 on David Thomas' independent label Hearthan Records. The song was written by band members David Thomas, Peter Laughner, and Gene O'Connor during their stint with Rocket from the Tombs.

The single was featured on the 1978 EP Datapanik in the Year Zero, and later the 2015 compilation album Elitism for the People 1975-78. In 2016, it was re-released in the United Kingdom on Record Store Day by Fire Records, in a limited edition of 1,000 copies.

== Background ==
After the breakup of Rocket from the Tombs in mid-1975, which bassist Craig Bell attributed to youthful frustration and lack of a "peacemaker" in the band, frontman David Thomas sought to record their unreleased material for posterity. This led to him proposing the founding of Pere Ubu to Laughner in September 1975, with the intention of being a studio-only band for the sole purpose of recording one single before disbanding. Thomas later stated:

Rocket From the Tombs ended very badly in the summer of ’75. I wasn’t going to mess with a band anymore – I just wanted to leave something behind. My ambition was to have a record in one of those Salvation Army record bins which somebody could come across in ten years’ time and say: ‘Wow, there was this band in 1975 in Cleveland…

Laughner liked the idea and added synthesizer player Allen Ravenstine, guitarist Tom Herman, and drummer Scott Krauss to the band—musicians he had lived with at the Plaza, an apartment building owned by Ravenstine where they performed experimental music on synthesizers and tape recorders.

"30 Seconds Over Tokyo" was released in December 1975 on Hearthan Records, an independent record label owned by Thomas which later changed its name to Hearpen Records after the holding company which Thomas operated. The single performed better than anticipated, especially in Minneapolis and abroad in London and Paris. Thomas discussed the future of Pere Ubu with his bandmates at the Plaza, and they decided to keep the group active for the foreseeable future.

== Music ==
The song's lyrics are based on the 1942 Doolittle Raid, as told from the perspective of a pilot on a suicide mission. Its title was borrowed from the 1943 book Thirty Seconds Over Tokyo by Doolittle Raid pilot Captain Ted W. Lawson, which was adapted into a film of the same name in 1944. According to Rocket from the Tombs bassist Craig Bell, the genesis of the song was a riff written by guitarists Gene "Cheetah" O'Connor and Peter Laughner, with frontman David Thomas penning the lyrics. Thomas, who referred to it as a pop song, said that "30 Seconds" was "probably the last time I ever wrote in a straight narrative form".

Additionally, an early version of "30 Seconds Over Tokyo" was recorded as Rocket from the Tombs at the band's home studio in February 1975. The band's last concert was supporting Television at the Piccadilly Inn in Cleveland, which was organized by Peter Laughner; this marked Television's first performance outside of New York City. Recordings from this set were released as an archival album called The Day the Earth Met Rocket from the Tombs in 2002.

== Recording and production ==
While rehearsal of the song took three days, "30 Seconds Over Tokyo", which clocks in at over six minutes, was recorded and mixed in a single night in October 1975 at Audio Recording in Cleveland. Another Rocket from the Tombs song, "Final Solution", was supposed to be the single's B-side; however, the song "Heart of Darkness" emerged from a jam session during the rehearsal for "30 Seconds", and the band members preferred the new composition. "Final Solution" would become their second single the following year.

Ravenstine played his part on an EML ElectroComp 200 synthesizer. Herman found Ravenstine's synthesizer playing underappreciated, calling his style different from other bands of the era that used synths in that it "pushed the energy level higher" rather than adding ambience to the mix. Ravenstine used the synthesizer to emulate the sound of radial engines used in planes during World War II, as well as the static-laden radio transmission at the end. He later became an airline pilot after leaving Pere Ubu in the 1980s.

Herman played rhythm guitar filtered through a Morley wah-wah pedal throughout. Fender and Peavey amplifiers were used by Wright and Laughner, who alternated between second electric guitar and a Danelectro six-string bass guitar.

All members perform during the free improvisation sections, which Herman described as "every man for himself". A guitar amplifier borrowed from the studio was malfunctioning during the sessions, which resulted in an unusual "neat squishy break-up". The song ends abruptly with a flurry of Ravenstine's emulated radio static, with Thomas' voice passed through a high-pass filter to mimic a malfunctioning aircraft radio.

According to Krauss, engineer Bill Cavanaugh clashed with the band, especially Ravenstine, over their creative decisions, and tried putting Krauss's cymbals through a harmonizer, which he vetoed. The pressing plant to which the final mix was delivered worriedly called up the band by telephone, informing them that the pressed singles were compromised with excess noise; Cavanaugh compared one of these pressings to the master tape and found that it sounded identical.

The original 1975 single release bore the note: "For more information write: Francis Ubu, c/o 3206 Prospect, #35, Cleveland, Ohio, 44115. Also available a limited edition of 200 pataphysical diagrams; send 75 cents for each".

== Critical reception ==
In 1978, Tim Lott of Record Mirror praised the single, labelling its atmosphere of gloom "more realistic" than the "death-and-destruction heavy metal crap pumped out by the likes of Judas Priest", the "A-bomb overtones" "thoughtfully conceived", and the final section "fatal", characterizing it as experimental rock and "discordant gothic rock".

"30 Seconds Over Tokyo" has since been recognized as a landmark proto-punk release, with Uncut writer Tom Pinnock defining it as "post-punk before its time". Writing in the book Rip It Up and Start Again, critic Simon Reynolds called it "almost prog in its structural strangeness", with its intro "like some loping, rhythmically sprained hybrid of Black Sabbath and reggae".

Later Steve Huey of AllMusic wrote that the song's "lurching guitar riffs and cacophonous noise are a perfect match for singer David Thomas' apocalyptic visions". Mojo called both "30 Seconds" and its follow-up "Final Solution" "stunning". Music writer Steve Taylor called the 1975 Rocket from the Tombs live recording of "30 Seconds" "addictive", comparing it to Pink Floyd's "Interstellar Overdrive". When Rocket from the Tombs reformed in 2003, they re-recorded the song in a heavier style.

== Legacy ==
The single was featured on the 1978 EP Datapanik in the Year Zero, and later the 2015 compilation album Elitism for the People 1975-78. In 2016, it was re-released in the United Kingdom on Record Store Day by Fire Records, in a limited edition of 1,000 copies.

== Personnel ==
Pere Ubu

- Crocus Behemoth (David Thomas) – lead vocals, radio, "Cpt. of Palcontents"
- Thom Herman – electric guitar
- Peter Laughner – "spinal guitar", bass guitar, whisper
- Tim Wright – "phynancial guitar", bass guitar, whisper
- Scott Krauss – drums
- Allen Ravenstine – synthesizer (EML 200), modulation

Technical staff

- Bill Cavanaugh – engineering, tape operation, mastering, mixer
- Jon Luoma – cover art
- Tim Ernst – "necessary assistance"
- Peter Laugher – liner notes
- Crocus Behemoth – package design
- Marianne Livchak – financial management
