= Carnival of Souls (Pere Ubu album) =

Studio album by Pere Ubu
- Released: September 9, 2014
- Genre: Alternative rock
- Label: Fire Records
- Producer: David Thomas

Pere Ubu chronology
Lady from Shanghai (2012)	Carnival of Souls (2014)	20 Years in a Montana Missile Silo (2017)

Carnival of Souls is the fifteenth studio album by the American band Pere Ubu, released on September 9, 2014. The title is taken from the 1962 film, for which the band had created an underscore. "Irene" was released as a single.

== Production ==
The album was written while Pere Ubu toured Europe in support of Lady from Shanghai. Darryl Boon joined the band on clarinet. In addition to the film, Pere Ubu was inspired by Van der Graaf Generator's Pawn Hearts.

== Critical reception ==
Professional ratings
Review scores
Source	Rating
AllMusic	4/5 stars
Drowned in Sound	8/10
Record Collector	3/5 stars
PopMatters	9/10

Record Collector wrote that the album "scrapes up enough sporadic excellence to justify David Thomas’ perseverance in the 21st-century scheme of things." Greil Marcus, in The Believer, thought that the lead track "Golden Surf II" "shoots out like a flood, and then you can ride the wave of transmorgrification that sweeps over the whole album." The Milwaukee Journal Sentinel determined that the band "still challenges itself and its listeners on its unsettling, menacing circus of a latest disc."

AllMusic noted that "'Dr. Faustus', one of the album's most score-like pieces, combines metallic percussion, spare guitars and David Thomas' muttered vocals into something rustic and rickety, yet threatening at a moment's notice."

== Track listing ==
All songs written and composed by Pere Ubu.

CD version

No.	Title	Length
1.	"Golden Surf II"	4:10
2.	"Drag the River"	4:01
3.	"Visions of the Moon"	3:33
4.	"Dr Faustus"	4:22
5.	"Bus Station"	4:28
6.	"Road to Utah"	4:20
7.	"Carnival"	5:01
8.	"Irene"	4:13
9.	"Brother Ray"	12:02

LP version

Side A

1. Golden Surf II - 4:10
2. Strychnine 1 - 1:05
3. Drag The River - 4:01
4. Strychnine 2 - 1:00
5. Visions Of The Moon - 3:33
6. Strychnine 3 - 1:01
7. Dr. Faustus - 4:22

Side B

1. Strychnine 4 - 1:01
2. Bus Station - 4:28
3. Road To Utah - 4:20
4. Carnival - 5:01
5. Strychnine 5 - 1:00
6. Irene - 4:13
