= Song of the Bailing Man =

Studio album by Pere Ubu
- Released: September 1982
- Recorded: August 1981 – January 1982
- Studio: Suma (Painesville, Ohio)
- Genre: Post-punk
- Length: 36:10
- Label: Rough Trade
- Producer: Adam Kidron

Pere Ubu chronology
390° of Simulated Stereo (1981)	Song of the Bailing Man (1982)	Terminal Tower (1985)

David Thomas chronology
Vocal Performances (1981)	Song of the Bailing Man (1982)	Variations on a Theme (1983)

Song of the Bailing Man is the fifth album by the American rock band Pere Ubu, released in September 1982 by Rough Trade Records. Drummer Scott Kraus was replaced by Anton Fier of the Feelies for the recording. It was the band's final release until 1988's The Tenement Year.

== Background ==
The recording sessions for Song of the Bailing Man were reportedly stressful and contentious. After the success of their previous album The Art of Walking, the band wanted to pursue a more focused project. Geoff Travis, head of Rough Trade Records, suggested British producer Adam Kidron, who took over production from Paul Hamann for the album.

Following the departure of Scott Krauss, Feelies drummer Anton Fier joined the group. He had previously performed with the band as a stand-in for Krauss in 1978. Fier's work ethic brought a greater sense of structure to the sessions, but his perfectionist approach which involved re-doing takes over and over, clashed with guitarist Mayo Thompson who preferred more free-form guitar playing. Besides David Thomas, the band were not satisfied with the album, which Thompson labelled "Song of the Boring Man", he later stated:

I was like the guitar player on those records. The unhappy guitar player on Song of the Bailing Man. By that time the really miserable guitar player. I kept thinking to myself, when Anton Fier was saying to me, here's this little thing [sings baroque line]. As I understand it, all I need to do is get one of them right and you could fly it on to the whole session. Why don't you play it? It was that kind of a session. And we need some more tunes. Why doesn't someone just write some more tunes? I was ready to go home; I was pissed off. They hated me and I hated them by that time — it was just a miserable mess. Ravenstine doesn't talk to me still.

Subsequently, tensions mounted during a U.S. tour in late 1982, exacerbating the fractures. Upon returning, the members avoided communication and after several months, the group acknowledged that Pere Ubu had effectively disbanded.

== Recording and production ==
Thompson and other members of the band were not satisfied with the album's final mix, and the overdubbing process, he stated:

The recording of [Song of] the Bailing Man was slightly different because it was really done in pieces. Adam [Kidron] would have somebody over from the office and they would sit there for a couple of hours and do something. It was not a band tracking in the usual sort of way.

Though in retrospect, frontman David Thomas highly regarded the album, stating: "‘Song of the Bailing Man’ is a massively under-recognized achievement. It was meant as a bookend to ‘Art Of Walking’ which I had conceived of as watching water drain from a bathtub. The draining water shapes itself like a funnel. The focus is the center of the funnel which is empty. The song is defined by the thing that’s not there. ‘Song of the Bailing Man’ was meant to be the opposite."

== Critical reception ==
Professional ratings
Review scores
Source	Rating
AllMusic	3/5 stars
Chicago Tribune	3/4 stars
Robert Christgau	B+
The Encyclopedia of Popular Music	2/5 stars
PopMatters	7/10 stars
The Rolling Stone Album Guide	3/5 stars
Spin Alternative Record Guide	6/10

In his review for Melody Maker, David Fricke wrote that Song of the Bailing Man "is an inspired, invigorating, confounding, disturbing... yeah, one hell of a swinging way to go. Still the futility Ubu must have felt making far sighted music in a chronically near-sighted world is pressed hard into these grooves."

Record Collector described the album as walking "a tightrope between garage rock and art, generally veering towards the latter". While Time Out described the album as "a brilliant band breaking every rule of aesthetics... and sounding all the more exciting for it."

Writing in Alternative Press in April 2000, the album was said to "continue the downbeat trend, with even its more rocking tracks... suffused with melancholy confusion.... This disc is an essential purchase, but they're definitely not dancefloor or party fodder."

The Wire noted that the record was "swathed in layers of reverb-as-sugarcoating and [drummer Anton] Fier's backbeats ensure that every song here moves several bpm faster than anything else in [their] catalogue.... easily Ubu's most accessible material."

Trouser Press wrote that "Fier’s lighter, jazzier playing sets the tone for an album that, for all its Euro-prog iconoclasm, never quite ignites." The Spin Alternative Record Guide called Song of the Bailing Man "more of a bouncy pop record, though Thomas is as gone as ever."

The Quietus wrote that "Song Of The Bailing Man is a far more consistent and enjoyable affair that invites multiple listens and doesn’t have an under par track on it. You could almost call it Pere Ubu’s ‘jazz album’. On ‘The Vulgar Boatman Bird’, Ravenstine’s synth emulates the sound of chirping cicadas, Tony Maimone’s repetitive bass figure recalls Can’s Holger Czukay on a track such as ‘Mother Sky’, whilst Thomas does his best ‘Ethel Merman on gas’ routine. Thompson’s guitar part and Anton Fier’s rolling drums slot together in a seemingly effortless manner. On the strength of this material, it’s a shame that this was the only album this line up recorded. Clearly the presence of Fier (the first Feelies album, Golden Palominos etc) added something essential and rather special to the mix but apparently his perfectionism and Mayo Thompson’s freewheeling attitude did not sit well together on tour, and the band broke up shortly afterwards".

In its review of the Architecture of Language 1979–1982 boxset, The Quietus wrote that "Tony Maimone's basslines play a bigger part on this record, making this LP more overtly poppy sounding than its predecessors."

== Track listing ==
All tracks are written by Pere Ubu (David Thomas Tony Maimone, Anton Fier, Mayo Thompson and Allen Ravenstine), except where noted.

No.	Title	Writer(s)	Length
1.	"The Long Walk Home"		2:34
2.	"Use of a Dog"		3:17
3.	"Petrified"		2:16
4.	"Stormy Weather"		3:20
5.	"West Side Story"		2:46
6.	"Thoughts That Go by Steam"		3:47
7.	"Big Ed's Used Farms"		2:24
8.	"A Day Such as This"		7:17
9.	"The Vulgar Boatman Bird"		2:49
10.	"My Hat"		1:19
11.	"Horns Are a Dilemma"	Pere Ubu, John Thompson	4:21
Total length:			36:10

== Release history ==
Year of release	Place of release	Format	Label
1981	United Kingdom	Vinyl LP	Rough Trade
1982	United Kingdom, Italy, Netherlands, United States	Vinyl LP	Rough Trade
1989	United Kingdom & United States	CD	Rough Trade
1999	United Kingdom, United States, Japan	CD	Cooking Vinyl, Thirsty Ear, Bomba Records
2002	Italy	Vinyl LP	Get Back
2004	Russia	CD	Cum'On Everybody Records
2016	United Kingdom & Europe	Vinyl LP	Fire Records
2017	Europe	CD	Fire Records

== Personnel ==
Pere Ubu

- David Thomas – vocals, cover artwork
- Mayo Thompson – guitar
- Allen Ravenstine – EML synthesizers
- Tony Maimone – bass
- Anton Fier – drums, piano, marimba, percussion

with:

- Eddie "Tan Tan" Thornton – trumpet

Technical

- Paul Hamann – engineer
- John Thompson – design
