= Pere Ubu =

American rock band

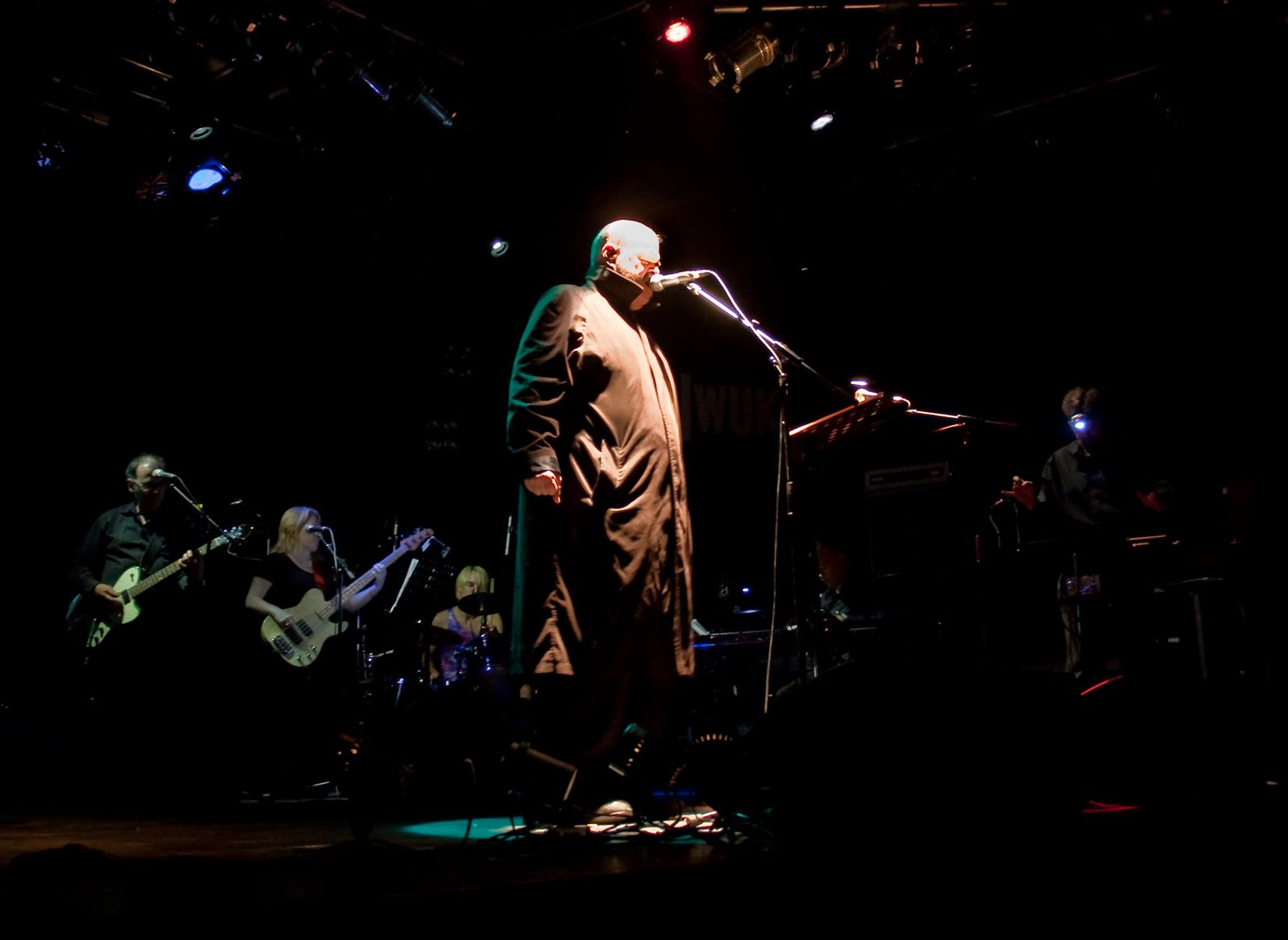
- Pere Ubu performing in 2009

Background information
- Origin: Cleveland, Ohio, United States
- Genres: Art punk; post-punk; art rock; experimental rock; new wave; proto-punk
- Years active: 1975–1982; 1987–2025
- Labels: Hearpen; Blank; Mercury; Radar; Chrysalis; Rough Trade; Fontana; Imago; Tim/Kerr; Cooking Vinyl; DGC; Thirsty Ear; Smog Veil; Fire; Cherry Red
- Spinoff of: Rocket From the Tombs
- Past members: David Thomas; Keith Moliné; Michele Temple; Alex Ward; Steve Mehlman; Andy Diagram; Jack Jones; Scott Krauss; Allen Ravenstine; Tom Herman; Tim Wright; Peter Laughner; Dave Taylor; Alan Greenblatt; Tony Maimone; Anton Fier; Mayo Thompson; Jim Jones; Chris Cutler; Eric Drew Feldman; Garo Yellin; Paul Hamann; Scott Benedict; Wayne Kramer; Darryl Boon; David Cintron; Gary Siperko; Kristoph Hahn; Robert Wheeler; P.O. Jørgens; Gagarin
- Website: ubuprojex.com

Pere Ubu was an American rock band formed in Cleveland, Ohio, in 1975. The band had a variety of lineup changes, with frontman and leader David Thomas the sole constant member. In December 1975, they released their debut single "30 Seconds Over Tokyo"; their debut album The Modern Dance followed in 1978. They disbanded in 1982, but reformed in 1987 and remained active until Thomas' death on April 23, 2025.

Their work drew inspiration from avant-garde music, garage rock, musique concrète, performance art, and the environment of the Midwestern Rust Belt. Despite their association with art punk and post-punk, Thomas rejected the punk rock label, describing the band as "avant-garage" and "just a rock band".

Their single "Waiting for Mary" peaked at number 6 on the Modern Rock Tracks chart on June 17, 1989. The music video was played on MTV. Pere Ubu have been cited as an influence by artists such as Joy Division, Pixies, Hüsker Dü, the Breeders, Henry Rollins, Guided by Voices, R.E.M., Sisters of Mercy, Thomas Dolby, Julian Cope, Six Finger Satellite, Mission of Burma and Peter Murphy.

== History ==
=== 1970s ===
After the short-lived Cleveland-based band Rocket from the Tombs disbanded in mid-1975, its members pursued separate projects. Guitarist Cheetah Chrome joined the Dead Boys, while other members joined the Saucers. Lead singer David Thomas and guitarist Peter Laughner formed a new band in September 1975 for the purpose of recording one Rocket from the Tombs song to release as a single, recruiting guitarist Tom Herman, bass guitarist Tim Wright, drummer Scott Krauss, and synthesist Allen Ravenstine. They named the band after Père Ubu, the main character in French writer Alfred Jarry's 1896 avant-garde play Ubu Roi.

The band lived at the Plaza Apartments, located at 3206 Prospect Avenue in Downtown Cleveland; then owned by Ravenstine, the Plaza was also home to many other local artists.

Pere Ubu drew influences from proto-punk and mid-1960s rock artists like the Velvet Underground, the Stooges and MC5; 1960s progressive pop such as the Beach Boys and Van Dyke Parks; early electronic artists Silver Apples and Beaver & Krause; krautrock bands Can and Neu!; English progressive rock band Van der Graaf Generator; and Captain Beefheart.

In December 1975, the band released the single "30 Seconds Over Tokyo", inspired by the Doolittle Raid and named after the film of the same name. The B-side was "Heart of Darkness", inspired by Joseph Conrad's 1899 novella of the same name. The single was initially supposed to be the band's only release. David Thomas said:

Rocket From the Tombs ended very badly in the summer of '75. I wasn’t going to mess with a band anymore – I just wanted to leave something behind. My ambition was to have a record in one of those Salvation Army record bins which somebody could come across in ten years’ time and say: ‘Wow, there was this band in 1975 in Cleveland…

The band first performed live on December 31, 1975. On March 18, 1976, they released the single "Final Solution"/"Cloud 149." Guitarist Peter Laughner, who had been suffering from alcoholism and abusing other substances, left the group shortly after the release of the single. He would die of acute pancreatitis on June 22, 1977, aged 24.

"Street Waves" backed with "My Dark Ages (I Don't Get Around)" was released as a single on October 12, 1976. Mercury Records A&R representative Cliff Burnstein came across the single in a record store and persuaded the band to sign to Blank Records, a short-lived imprint of Mercury he was developing. Bassist Tim Wright left the band to join the New York-based no wave band DNA, and Tony Maimone was recruited as a replacement. On November 26, 1977, music journalist Jon Savage coined the term "post-punk" in Sounds magazine, to describe Ohio bands such as Devo and Pere Ubu alongside a variety of British groups.

Pere Ubu's debut album The Modern Dance was released in February 1978. The record featured a song by Peter Laughner and was recorded over several months between the band's early Hearpen singles. Most of the songs were written before work on the album began. The album sold poorly upon release, but was critically acclaimed and became influential on early alternative rock.

By late 1978, the band began recording their second album, Dub Housing, the title being inspired by a block of identical rowhouses in Baltimore as likened to the heavy use of delay in dub music. The album was recorded with the intention of creating a set of interconnected tracks that worked together as a cohesive whole. Dub Housing was released on November 17, 1978, through Chrysalis Records; it was ranked the thirteenth best album of 1978 by Sounds and later eighth by NME.

On September 19, 1979, Pere Ubu released New Picnic Time. Guitarist Tom Herman subsequently quit and the group briefly disbanded. It soon reformed with Mayo Thompson of Red Krayola, who had previously toured with the band in England in 1978.

=== 1980s ===
The Art of Walking (1980) featured Thompson on guitar and vocals and reportedly sold better than any other Pere Ubu release up to that point. According to Thomas, the record was conceived to be "defined by the thing that's not there". The title came about after someone had criticized the band for writing too many songs about driving. A performance of the song "Birdies" was featured in the 1982 film Urgh! A Music War. For their followup, Song of the Bailing Man (1982), Krauss was replaced by Anton Fier. The album's production was reportedly chaotic and led to the group disbanding again soon afterwards. Krauss and Maimone formed Home and Garden, while Thomas worked on a solo career, notably with Richard Thompson and former members of Henry Cow.

By the late 1980s, one of Thomas' solo projects eventually featured much of Pere Ubu, which led to the band reforming again in 1987 with guitarist Jim Jones and former Henry Cow drummer Chris Cutler joining. The Tenement Year (1988), the first album by the reformed band, was more pop-oriented than their previous work. The following year, the video for the single "Waiting for Mary" appeared on MTV briefly. After the recording of Cloudland, which continued the band's move in a more accessible direction, Cutler and Ravenstine departed; Ravenstine subsequently became an airline pilot. Eric Drew Feldman joined the band in time for the Cloudland tour and the recording of Worlds in Collision (1991), but left afterwards to work with former Pixies frontman Black Francis.

=== 1990s ===
In 1993, Story of My Life was released. Maimone left again to join They Might Be Giants, and Michele Temple and Garo Yellin joined the band for the Story of My Life tour and the 1995 album Ray Gun Suitcase. In 1994, Robert Wheeler joined, filling Ravenstine's previous role. Krauss left the band during the Ray Gun Suitcase sessions. For the Ray Gun Suitcase tour, guitarist Jim Jones departed as a touring member (although he continued to contribute to recordings), founding guitarist Tom Herman replaced him for the tour.

Concurrent with the 1996 release of the Datapanik in Year Zero box set, Jim Jones retired due to health problems. Tom Herman returned to the band after a twenty-year absence to tour with the band in 1995, and went on to record Pennsylvania (1998), which also featured guitar contributions from Jones. Guitarist Wayne Kramer of MC5 joined the band for their 1998 summer tour.

=== 2000–2010 ===
While much of 2000 was given over to live performances by Thomas's side projects – David Thomas and Two Pale Boys (Andy Diagram and Keith Moliné) and The Pale Orchestra – Pere Ubu played a gig bannered '55 Years of Pain' in June at the Cleveland Rock and Roll Hall of Fame alongside 15-60-75. The band then teamed up in September 2000 with Kramer for another performance of '55 Years of Pain' at the Royal Festival Hall at Southbank Centre, London.

Although Pere Ubu took a break from touring in 2001, they worked on material for a new album. Thomas also devoted himself for much of the year to live performance. This included his theatrical project 'Mirror Man (A Geography of Sound in Two Acts)' as well as an extensive David Thomas and Two Pale Boys European and US tour. In February, The trio were also asked to support English gothic rock band the Sisters of Mercy at five concerts in England. Founding member Andrew Eldritch had long cited Pere Ubu and David Thomas as a key musical influence.Speaking in 2016, Eldritch said: "I remember seeing the best gig I ever saw in my life which was Pere Ubu supported by the Human League on the tiny stage of the F Club in Leeds [December 7, 1978]."

2002 saw the first official release of pre-Ubu group Rocket From the Tombs' recordings from 1974. While bootlegs of varying quality had long circulated The Day The Earth Met The Rocket From the Tombs' drew on original rehearsal and concert masters, and was released by Smog Veil Records in February. The Pere Ubu album St. Arkansas followed in May on Glitterhouse Records with David Thomas, Tom Herman, Robert Wheeler, Michele Temple and Steve Mehlman comprising the band, plus Jim Jones again contributing guitar parts. In September 2002, the band undertook the 11-date “Mighty Road Tour” in the U.S. and Canada, after which Tom Herman left again and was replaced by Keith Moliné of Two Pale Boys. In October, Thomas and Moliné were joined by Robert Wheeler, Michele Temple and Cutler to score a live soundtrack for a 3-D screening of It Came from Outer Space at London's Royal Festival Hall. This performance direction reflected a formative influence on Pere Ubu and Thomas's long-held affection for B-Movies.

Pere Ubu's 'Mighty Road' tour resumed in February 2003 with 10 dates in the US. 2003 was also notable for performances in the summer and winter across the US and Canada by a revived Rocket From the Tombs. The band comprised David Thomas, Cheetah Chrome, Craig Bell, Richard Lloyd of Television, and Steve Mehlman. Of the 33 dates, one at the Beachland Ballroom in Cleveland was a benefit for an increasingly ill Jim Jones. Richard Lloyd recorded and engineered live in the studio performances of the original Rockets' songs. Originally, 'Rocket Redux' was sold as gig-only merchandise until it was commercially released the following year by Smog Veil Records.

Live film accompaniment came to the fore again for Pere Ubu in 2004. Firstly, the group premiered its underscore to Roger Corman's X, the Man With X-Ray Eyes at the 'Celebrate Brooklyn' festival on 22 July. The winter of that year also saw a UK tour that revived the band's live underscoring of 'It Came from Outer Space'. American music producer Hal Willner also invited David Thomas to join two shows. The first took place on April 1 in Los Angeles, 'Let's Eat – Feasting on The Firesign Theatre', a celebration of the anarchic comedy outfit of that name. The cast included George Wendt, John Goodman, Todd Rundgren, Chloe Webb and Loudon Wainwright among others.

Just over three weeks later Thomas, partnered by the Paleboys, joined Hal Willner's tribute to director Federico Fellini and composer Nino Rota. 'Perfect Partners' took place at London's Barbican Theatre and the production also featured Carla Bley, Roy Nathanson, Roger Eno, Kate St John, Beth Orton and Geri Allen. 2004 also saw Pere Ubu support Spiritualized at London's Royal Festival Hall on 1 August, Rocket From The Tombs played Kassel in Germany on 25 September and David Thomas and Two Pale Boys performed extensively in Europe and America with the release in April of 18 Monkeys On A Dead Man's Chest (Smog Veil Records and Glitterhouse Records).

During 2005, Pere Ubu toured a show dubbed 'Live Free or Diet', as well as other concerts across America and Europe. Additionally, the band performed their live underscore to screenings of Roger Corman's 'X, the Man With X-Ray Eyes: April 9 at the Byrd Theatre, Richmond Virginia; August 12 at the Museum of Contemporary Art in North Adams, Massachusetts and November 5 at the Regent Square Theater in Pittsburgh.

2005 also saw David Thomas join Wayne Kramer and the newly monikered DKT-MC5 as well as the Sun Ra Arkestra on 25 February at the Royal Festival Hall London. When Patti Smith organised the 'Meltdown Festival' in June at the Royal Festival Hall, London she invited Thomas to take part. He sang, with accompaniment from the London Sinfonietta, Bertolt Brecht and Kurt Weill's 'Alabama Song'. And, as was now becoming customary when the band was not on the road, Pere Ubu guitarist Keith Moliné joined David Thomas with trumpeter Andy Diagram for a series of improvisational gigs across Europe.

From May until the end of 2006 Pere Ubu gigged in Europe and America. On October 29 at the Royce Hall, Los Angeles, the group delivered a double bill consisting of that year's concert set and their live underscore to a screening of Roger Corman's 'X, the Man With X-Ray Eyes. There was also a nine date r in the summer and Fall.

On 19 September 2006 Pere Ubu released Why I Hate Women on Smog Veil Records. The band was Thomas, Moliné, Wheeler, Temple and Mehlan with contributions from Robert and Jack Kidney, Rodolphe Burger and Andy Diagram. Thomas had teamed up with Burger earlier in the summer for four dates in France. In October, Smog Veil Records and Glitterhouse Records issued Why I Remix Women a set of band reworkings of the original tracks by Thomas, Moliné and Temple. Gagarin, an electronica instrumentalist and drummer for Nico during the 1980s, had worked for several years as live sound man for Pere Ubu as well as providing occasional on-stage contributions . His remix of 'Blue Velvet' was included on the album.

In the spring of 2007, Pere Ubu hit the road once more, with six dates in America, 20 in Europe and followed in the Fall with four shows in the US and Canada. Work also started in 2007 on adapting, for performance, Alfred Jarry's 'Ubu Roi', the play that had inspired the band's name.

In December 2007, the download site Hearpen.com was launched providing live recordings and hard-to-source material by Pere Ubu and related acts.

During February and March 2008 Pere Ubu toured Europe and America. This included two live underscorings of Roger Corman's 'X, the Man With X-Ray Eyes: March 24 at the Neighborhood Theater, Charlotte, North Carolina and March 25 at the Plaza Theater, Atlanta, Georgia.

On February 18, 2008, Jim Jones, former guitarist, associate of the band from its earliest days and US manager for many years of the group's online store, died at his Cleveland residence.

On April 24, 2008, the Ether festival at Southbank Centre hosted the world premiere of Bring Me The Head of Ubu Roi. This adaptation by David Thomas of Ubu Roi was accompanied by animations by the Brothers Quay. The production featured David Thomas as Pere Ubu and Sarah Jane Morris as Mere Ubu with the rest of the band playing various roles.

Back in 2006 musical producer Hal Willner had gathered together a host of musicians and actors for a double CD Rogue's Gallery: Pirate Ballads, Sea Songs, and Chanteys. In the summer of 2008, Willner brought a three date live show of the work to the UK and Ireland. David Thomas who had contributed versions of 'Dan Dan' and 'The Drunken Sailor' to the album joined the cast along with Pere Ubu guitarist Keith Moliné for all performances.

In 2009, Bring Me The Head of Ubu Roi was staged once again; this time at the Animator Festival, Poznań, Poland on July 11. The band's new album, Long Live Père Ubu!, released September 14 on Cooking Vinyl Records with the American release issued on Hearpen Records. The disc reprised the Ubu Roi story. Sarah Jane Morris guested on the disc as did Ubu's sound man Gagarin. The rest of the band comprised: Thomas, Moliné, Wheeler, Temple and Mehlman. During the Fall and winter the group toured extensively in Europe including material from the new album.

From February 2010, the band continued to tour the new album in the United Kingdom under the banner 'Long Live Père Ubu! – The Spectacle'. The concert show also had its American première on 28 March in New York. The band also performed debut album The Modern Dance in its entirety, firstly, at the Cleveland Beachland Ballroom, March 5 then on March 24 at Chicago's Lincoln Hall.

David Thomas once more joined the cast of Hal Willner's live show Rogue's Gallery: Pirate Ballads, Sea Songs, and Chanteys. Thomas followed that show at the Sydney Opera House, Australia on January 28 with a concert of Pere Ubu songs, again in Sydney, on January 31 where he was backed by local band The Holy Soul. Thomas also revived his spoken word set 'the Ghost Line Diaries', originally aired at the 14th Genoa International Poetry Festival, Genoa, Italy, on June 19, 2008. Three gigs took place: Copenhagen, Denmark on October 9; Boston, USA on October 23 and in Geneva, Switzerland on December 5.

=== 2011–2020 ===
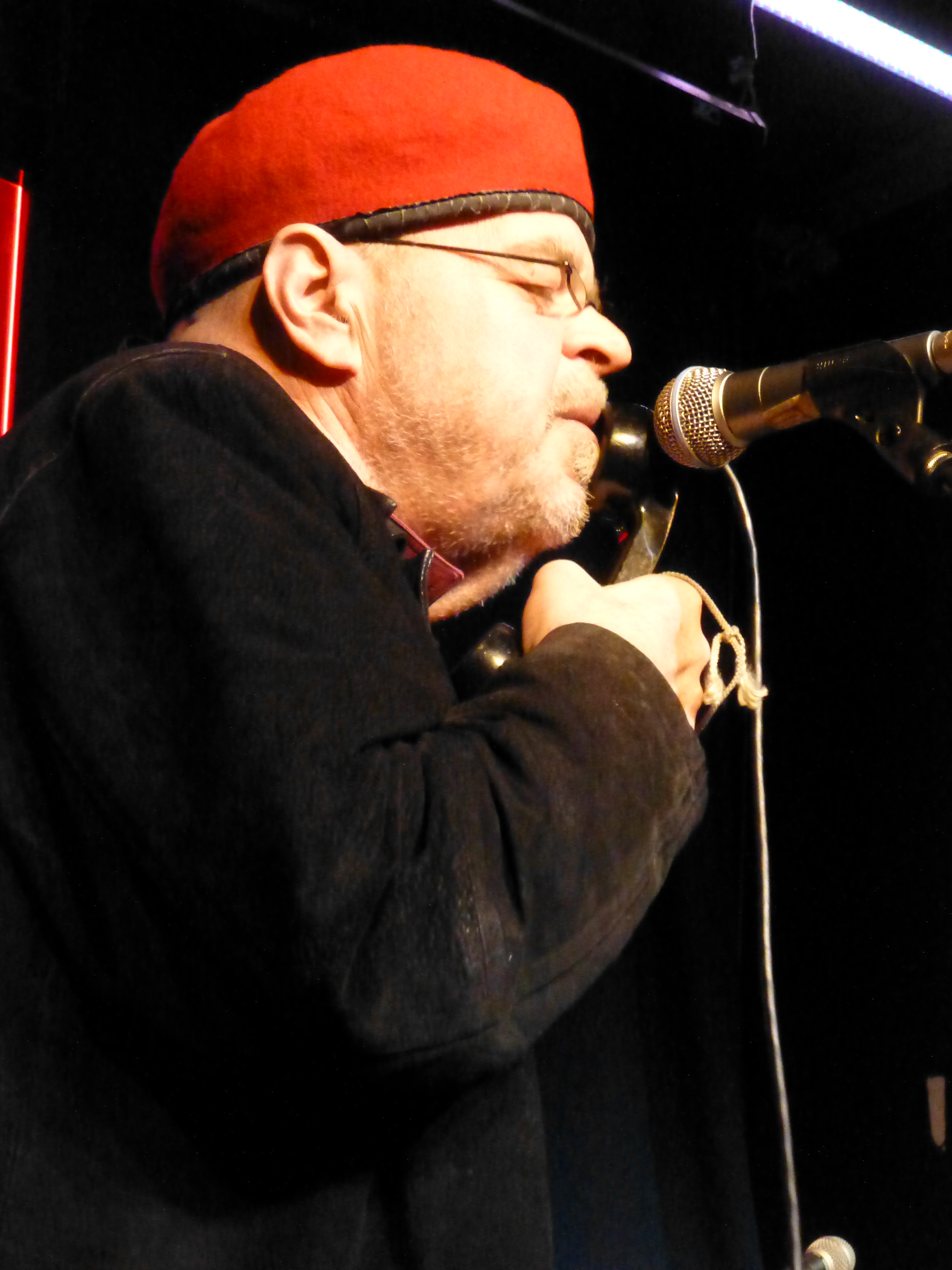
David Thomas of Pere Ubu on stage at Band on the Wall, Manchester, April 18, 2013

In February 2011, David Thomas and The Two Pale Boys were invited by the Sisters of Mercy to play at the Goth band's 30th anniversary gig in their hometown of Leeds.

On March 19, 2011, Tom Herman, guitarist from the first band's lineup, joined Pere Ubu at The Beachland Ballroom in Cleveland to perform a show that included a full performance of The Modern Dance. Through August, the group played a further 18 shows in Europe, incorporating The Modern Dance in a number of them.

In April, David Thomas joined fellow Rocket From the Tombs musician Cheetah Chrome for the two-date "Cleveland Confidential Book Tour": Cleveland Rock and Roll Hall of Fame and Museum (April 11) and The Grammy Museum, Los Angeles (April 14). In September, Rocket from the Tombs released a new album, Barfly, by Fire Records and Smog Veil Records. The band—David Thomas, Cheetah Chrome, Craig Bell, Richard Lloyd, and Steve Mehlman—played seven U.S. dates in December.

2011 also saw the first live underscoring to a screening of Carnival of Souls, a 1962 horror film directed by Herk Harvey. David Thomas and Two Pale Boys performed the show at London's Cafe Oto ( February 12); Cinéma L'Univers in Lille, France (June 4); and the Duke of York's Picture House, Brighton, England (December 2).

==== 2012 ====
While work started on a new Pere Ubu album in 2012 – tracks in progress appearing on the band's website 'Ubu Projex' throughout the year – there were no live performances by the band. A scheduled 16-date Rocket From the Tombs tour in May 2012 was disrupted when David Thomas fell ill. The first eight gigs in Europe were cancelled, six took place before Thomas became ill again resulting in the cancellation of the final two dates. However, the band played five gigs in America and Canada in October of that year.

In 2012, Thomas published 'The Book of Hieroglyphs', in which he ruminated on America and the nature of being an American. The book drew on lyrics from Pere Ubu, The Two Pale Boys and other Thomas works, supplemented by a number of essays.

The Pere Ubu long player Lady from Shanghai was released, January 7, 2013, on Fire Records. Its title referenced 'The Lady from Shanghai', a film noir made in 1947 by Orson Welles. The band comprised David Thomas; Keith Moliné; Michele Temple; Robert Wheeler; Steve Mehlman and Gagarin. Clarinettist Darryl Boon guested on the disc. A book, 'Chinese Whispers The Making of Pere Ubu's 'Lady from Shanghai', was published at the same time. This included an account of the creation of the album modelled on the parlour game Chinese Whispers.

On February 17, 2013, Pere Ubu performed the 'Modern Dance' album in full at the 'I'll Be Your Mirror' festival in Melbourne, Australia. A production of Bring Me The Head of Ubu Roi: Chamber Version' aired on March 8 in Lodz, Poland. This small cast version of the play featured Thomas, Gagarin, Malgosia Sady and Kiersty Boon.

An 11-date Pere Ubu tour of England followed in April 2013. A further gig in London on June 16 launched a European tour in June and July. Then on July 13, as part of the East End Film Festival, the band once more performed their live underscore to Carnival of Souls. In September, Pere Ubu played 17 dates in America and Canada. Protracted discussions with the US Customs and Immigration Service had preceded the tour but visas were denied to Keith Moliné and Gagarin. David Cintron guitarist with a number of Cleveland bands including the Terminal Lovers took Moliné's place. However, at a number of the shows Gagarin performed by video link from his studio in London.

Three dates followed in Europe during November before the band played several gigs in the UK and Ireland under the heading of the 'Visions of the Moon tour'. The set that featured some of the material that would appear on the Carnival of Souls album.

Pere Ubu's first performance of 2014 was at the Sons d'hiver festival in Creteil, France on February 15. On September 8 Carnival of Souls was released on Fire Records. The album had its musical roots in the live accompaniment that both Pere Ubu and David Thomas and Two Pale Boys had performed for a number of years to screenings of the Herk Harvey B-movie of that name. The band comprised: David Thomas; Keith Moliné; Michele Temple; Robert Wheeler; Steve Mehlman; Gagarin;and Darryl Boon. As with 'Lady From Shanghai', a book was published to coincide with the new album. 'Cogs The Making of Carnival Of Souls' contained essays by David Thomas, commentary from the musicians and album lyrics.

On September 12, the Pere Ubu Fim Group (on this occasion Thomas, Keith Moliné, Gagarin and Darryl Boon) performed their live underscore to Carnival of Souls at the L'Étrange Festival, Forum des Images in Paris, France.

The band embarked on a 13 date UK tour in November 2013 with support from the Pere Ubu Moon Unit (consisting of Thomas and other members of the main band). The 12th gig was an underscoring to Roger Corman's 'X, The Man With X Ray Eyes' at the Cinecity Brighton Film Festival on November 23. Between November 27 and December 6 the group played nine dates across mainland Europe. In 2015, Fire Records issued a mini-album of the Moon Unit's November 21 performance in Leeds, England.

From late January 2015 until the end of February, the group continued touring in Europe with material from Carnival of Souls with the Pere Ubu Moon Unit often providing support. Five dates in July in the UK were followed by a show at the New Horizons International Film Festival in Wroclaw, Poland on July 26. On August 21 Fire Records issued a four disc remastered vinyl box set, Elitism For the People 1975-1978. This comprised the Hearpen singles, The Modern Dance, Dub Housing and a live recording from 1977, made in New York at Max's Kansas City. A new Rocket from the Tombs disc Black Record appeared on November 21, again on Fire Records. The band was Thomas; Craig Bell; Gary Siperko; Buddy Akita; and Steve Mehlman with contributions from Akita's colleagues from This Moment In Black History: Lamont Thomas; Lawrence Caswell; and Chris Kulcsar.

Rocket From The Tombs played eight American dates in December 2015 followed by a show at the State-X New Forms Festival in Den Haag, Netherlands. After two appearances in England the band returned to Europe performing in Diksmuide, Belgium and at the Festival Les Aventuriers, in Paris on December 16.

On February 6, 2016, the Pere Ubu Film Unit delivered its live underscore once more to Carnival of Souls. This time, a dubbed in Spanish and colorized version of the film was screened at the Universitat Jaume I in Castelló de la Plana, Spain. Fire Records' release on March 18 of the second archival box set – Architecture of Language 1979-1982 (vinyl remasters of New Picnic Time, The Art of Walking, Song of the Bailing Man and Architectural Salvage a disc of live and alternate mixes) prompted a tour drawing on songs from 1975 to 1982. Tom Herman rejoined the touring band and selected the material for the set list.

The Coed Jail! debuted on March 22, 2016, at the Ruby Lounge in Manchester, England. It ran for most of the year – there was a break in the Fall – 43 dates in total in Europe, Canada and America ending on December 10 in the Casbah, San Diego, California. The name reprised the set of gigs that Pere Ubu performed in February 1978 alongside the Suicide Commandos. Johnny Dromette (John Thompson) record store manager, promoter, designer and housemate of Thomas, had coined the phrase for the game show set he had built over night in their living room. Dromette created the first posters for the band and designed the Datapanik in Year Zero EP cover He has often provided poster, tee-shirt and packaging design as well as video production work throughout Pere Ubu's career. His recollections of the time are shared in two interviews on Pere Ubu's own UbuDub podcast series.

Splinter group Pere Ubu (Moon Unit) also made three appearances in 2016, one in London (August 25 with support from David Thomas and Two Pale Boys) and two in France (Nantes, August 27 and Brest, November 19).

The final box sets in Fire Records' series of vinyl remasters appeared in the Spring of 2017. Les Haricots Sont Pas Salés 1987-1991, April 6, contained The Tenement Year, Cloudland, Worlds In Collision and Songs From the Lost Album. Drive, He Said 1994-2002 followed on May 26. It comprised Ray Gun Suitcase, Pennsylvania, St. Arkansas and Back Roads, a disc of outtakes and alternate mixes.

Rocket From the Tombs played the Beachland Tavern, Cleveland on May 11, 2017, and the Ace Of Cups in Columbus, Ohio on May 13. Both Rocket From the Tombs and Pere Ubu performed at the Austin Jukebox, a regular multi band show event, in Austin Texas, on May 19 and 20 respectively.

A repeat of the Coed Jail! set took place in Jarocin, Poland on July 15. The band on this occasion was: David Thomas; Gary Siperko; Robert Wheeler; Michele Temple; and Steve Mehlman. A recording of the concert would provide the bulk of the 2020 release, on Cherry Red Records, By Order of Mayor Pawlicki (Live in Jarocin). Pere Ubu (Moon Unit) played seven European dates in August and October.

At the end of September, Pere Ubu released 20 Years In A Montana Missile Silo on Cherry Red Records. The band was: David Thomas; Keith Molinè; Gary Siperko; Kristof Hahn (of The Swans); Darryl Boon; Robert Wheeler; Gagarin; Michele Temple; and Steve Mehlman. Welsh-Iranian artist Roshi Nasehi provided backing vocal to "I Can Still See".

The 'MonkeyNet Tour' in support of the new album, began in Pittsburgh, Pennsylvania on November 8, 2017. Thirteen more US performances took place before David Thomas became seriously ill resulting in the cancellation of seven concerts on the West Coast of America.

Marking their return to live performance in Spring 2018, Pere Ubu mounted the 'Grand Guignol' show at The Borderline in London. A nine-piece band took to the stage on May 19: David Thomas; Keith Moliné; Gary Siperko; Robert Wheeler; Gagarin; Michele Temple; Steve Mehlman; Darryl Boon; and Kristof Hahn. For the rest of May and start of June a more regular-sized band played 12 dates across Europe. The 'MonkeyNet Tour' then resumed with shows in New York (August 17) and Providence, Rhode Island (Aug 18). Five dates followed in September in Italy and one appearance in Tel Aviv (September 15).

Following the critical illness that had prematurely ended the original 'MonkeyNet' tour, Thomas initiated work, early in 2018, on a new Pere Ubu album. While still a work in progress by the end of the year, the plan was to include versions of three tracks at two Pere Ubu (Moon Unit) shows in December. As recounted in the sleeve notes that accompany The Long Goodbye, keyboardist Gagarin suggested, two days before the first gig, that the outfit perform the album in its entirety. The material aired on December 7 at the Music Hall in Ramsgate, England. The band comprised Thomas, Keith Moliné, Gagarin and Chris Cutler. The group repeated the set the following evening at the Théâtre Municipal Berthelot in Montreuil on the outskirts of Paris, a performance eventually issued as a companion disc to The Long Goodbye CD.

A few days after the Montreuil gig, David Thomas fell seriously ill again, was hospitalized and began a period of extensive recovery in 2019. However, The Long Goodbye was completed and released, July 12, on Cherry Red Records. The band was: David Thomas; Keith Moliné; Gagarin; Robert Wheeler; Michele Temple; Darryl Boon; and P. O. Jørgens. Guitarist Gary Siperko also guested. Once more a book accompanied the new album. Baptized Into the Buzz contained information about the new album and the related 2017 record that Thomas had made with Danish percussionist P. O. Jørgens: Live Free or Die on Ninth World Music. There were lyrics to both releases, commentary from musicians and a short piece of family biography by Thomas.

Pere Ubu toured The Long Goodbye late in 2019. Seven dates, spread over September, October and November, that took in London, Ireland, Norway, the Netherlands, Belgium and Italy. The band began 2020 with a performance at the Centro Conde Duque Arts in Madrid. The day before, January 15, David Thomas ran a workshop, 'How To Be A Singer', in partnership with the band's drummer Chris Cutler. However, further dates scheduled for 2020 were disrupted by the COVID-19 pandemic and ensuing lockdown. In response, in May The Avant Garage Fan Attic (Official) launched on subscription platform Patreon. The exclusive content includes Datapanik TV (DPKTV), a channel of live broadcasts hosted by David Thomas.

=== 2021–present ===
On February 11, 2022, the group played a one-off performance called "Pere Ubu's Canterbury Tales" at The University of Kent's Gulbenkain Theater in Canterbury. The group's line-up for this was show included Thomas, Moliné, Gagarin, Cutler and new member Alex Ward on guitar and clarinet. David Thomas and The Two Pale Boys (Moliné, Gagarin, and Andy Diagram for this performance) played an opening set, as did Rats On Rafts, who performed a live cover of Pere Ubu's Visions Of The Moon. The show was emceed by Bob Holman of the Bowery Poetry Club in New York City.

A new vinyl remasters box set, Nuke The Whales: 2006-2014 was released by Fire on April 1, 2022. The box set, packaged in the same style as the previous box sets, features Why I Hate Women (retitled Why I Luv Women), Lady From Shanghai, Long Live Pere Ubu! and Carnival of Souls. All of the albums except Long Live Pere Ubu! were remixed by David Thomas in 2021, and Why I Luv Women and Long Live Pere Ubu! make their vinyl debuts via this set.

Trouble On Big Beat Street is the 19th Pere Ubu studio album released in 2023. The band was: David Thomas, Keith Moliné, Gagarin, Alex Ward, Andy Diagram, Michele Temple and Jack Jones. David Thomas produced, mixed, and engineered it. The album inspired by ‘Song Cycle’ of Van Dyke Parks. The tracks on the album were played for the first time when the recordings took place. The vinyl release is ten tracks.The cd release includes all 17 tracks recorded during the sessions.

Pere Ubu toured Trouble On Big Beat Street in June and July 2023 with four dates: Pisa (Italy), Los Angeles, New York and London.

On April 23, 2025, David Thomas died of complications from kidney disease. The band's Facebook page said a final album and Thomas' autobiography would be published.

== Legacy ==
Pere Ubu have been cited as an influence by artists such as Joy Division, Pixies, Hüsker Dü, Guided by Voices, R.E.M., Sisters of Mercy, Thomas Dolby, Julian Cope, Six Finger Satellite, Peter Murphy of Bauhaus, Henry Rollins, Mission of Burma, Minutemen, the Dirtbombs, and Pell Mell.

== Personnel ==
Final lineup

- David Thomas – lead vocals, keyboards, melodeon, musette, theremin (1975–82, 1987–2025; his death)
- Keith Moliné – guitar (2002, 2005–16, 2016–2025)
- Michele Temple – bass (1994–2025)
- Steve Mehlman – drums (1995–2018, 2024–2025)
- Alex Ward – guitar, clarinet (2022–2025)
- Andy Diagram – trumpet (1999, 2007, 2022–2025)
- Jack Jones – theremin, backing vocals (2022–2025)

Previous members

- Scott Krauss – drums, keyboards (1975–77, 1978–81, 1987–94)
- Allen Ravenstine – synthesizer, saxophone (1975, 1976–82, 1987–88)
- Tom Herman – guitar, bass (1975–79, 1995–98, 1998–2002, 2016)
- Tim Wright – bass, guitar (1975–76) (died 2013)
- Peter Laughner – guitar, bass (1975–76)
- Dave Taylor – synthesizer, organ (1975–76)
- Alan Greenblatt – guitar (1976)
- Tony Maimone – bass, guitar, keyboards (1976–82, 1987–93, 2003–04)
- Anton Fier – drums, marimba (1977–78, 1981–82; died 2022)
- Mayo Thompson – guitar (1979–82)
- Jim Jones – guitar, keyboards (1987–94, 1994–95; died 2008)
- Eric Drew Feldman – keyboards (1989–92)
- Garo Yellin – electric cello (1993–94)
- Paul Hamann – bass (1994)
- Scott Benedict – drums (1994–95)
- Wayne Kramer – guitar (1998; died 2024)
- Sarah Jane Morris – vocals (2009)
- David Cintron – guitar (2013)
- Darryl Boon – clarinet (2013–16, 2016–2018)
- Gary Siperko – guitar (2016–2018)
- Christoph Hahn – steel guitar (2016–2018)
- Robert Wheeler – synthesizer, theremin (1994–99, 1999–2007, 2009–2020)
- P.O. Jørgens – drums, percussion (2019)
- Chris Cutler – drums, electronics (1987–90, 2004, 2019–2022)
- Gagarin (Graham Dowdall) – synthesizer, electronics (2007–2024, died 2024)

== Discography ==
=== Studio albums ===
- The Modern Dance (1978)
- Dub Housing (1978)
- New Picnic Time (1979)
- The Art of Walking (1980)
- Song of the Bailing Man (1982)
- The Tenement Year (1988)
- Cloudland (1989)
- Worlds in Collision (1991)
- Story of My Life (1993)
- Ray Gun Suitcase (1995)
- Pennsylvania (1998)
- St. Arkansas (2002)
- Why I Hate Women (2006)
- Long Live Père Ubu! (2009, with Sarah Jane Morris)
- Lady from Shanghai (2013)
- Carnival of Souls (2014)
- 20 Years in a Montana Missile Silo (2017)
- The Long Goodbye (2019)
- Trouble On Big Beat Street (2023)

=== Live albums ===
- 390° of Simulated Stereo (1981) – Collection of live tracks recorded between 1976 and 1979
- One Man Drives While the Other Man Screams (1989) – Collection of live tracks recorded between 1978 and 1981
- Apocalypse Now (1999) – Recorded December 7, 1991, at Shuba's (Chicago/USA)
- The Shape of Things (2000) – Recorded April 7, 1976, at The Mistake (Cleveland/USA)
- London Texas (2009) – Recorded March 16, 1989, at The Mean Fiddler (London/GB)
- Live at the Longhorn (2013) – Recorded April 1, 1978, at Jay's Longhorn (Minneapolis/USA)
- The Pere Ubu Moon Unit (2015) – Recorded November 21, 2014, at Brudenell Social Club (Leeds/GB)
- By Order of Mayor Pawlicki (2020) – Recorded mainly July 15, 2017, at Scena Rynek Festival (Jarocin/Poland)
- Bring Me The Head Of Ubu Roi, Live (2022) – Performed and recorded April 25, 2008, at the Queen Elizabeth Hall (London/GB)

=== Digital-only live albums ===
- In the Shadow of the Aeronautical Shot Peening Co. (2021) – Recorded by David Thomas on a cassette at the Pirate's Cove, Old River Road, Cleveland, Ohio, on June 2, 1977.
- Manhattan 1977 (2021) – Recorded at Max's Kansas City, New York City, 1977.
- Theatre 140 (2021) – Recorded in Brussels, Belgium, on May 5, 1978. A different version was available in Datapanik in Year Zero (1996)
- On The Beach (2021) – Recorded during a private party in Bratenahl, Ohio, on July 4, 1978.
- The Avant Garage (2021) – Recorded during the 1st International Garage Exhibition, Cleveland, Ohio, on March 2, 1979.
- Robson Square Theater (2021) – Recorded in Vancouver, Canada, on June 27, 1979.
- Road to URGH! (2021) – Recorded at the Fox Warfield Theater, San Francisco, California, on August 15, 1980.
- Conde Duque, The Long Goodbye (2021) – Recorded in Madrid, Spain, on January 15, 2020.
- Walking in Bremen (2021) – Recorded at Uni-Mensa in Bremen, Germany, on February 21, 1981.
- Taking Shape (2021) – Recorded at The Mistake, Cleveland, Ohio, on April 7, 1976, or May 5, 1976 (there is some uncertainty). A different recording of the show was available in The Shape of Things (2000) live album.
- Fiddler on the Desk (2021) – Recorded at The Mean Fiddler, London, England, on March 16, 1989.
- Sidewalks in Texas (2021) – Recorded at The Mistake, Cleveland, Ohio, early 1980 (date unknown).
- On the Road to the Lost Album (2021) – Recorded at The Paradiso, Amsterdam, Netherlands, on July 14, 1981.
- Oh, Pennsylvania, I Do Remember Thee (2021) – Collection of live recordings (1998 & 2003) originally compiled by David Thomas as an aide-memoire in preparation for a Pere Ubu Tour.
- Band on the Wall (2021) – Recorded at Band on the Vall, Manchester, England, on April 18, 2013.
- MuBuC5 (2021) – Recorded during the Fall Of The Magnetic Empire Festival at The Knitting Factory, New York City, on September 13, 1996. Featuring Wayne Kramer on guitar.
- Wish There Was No Bugs (2022) – Recorded at the Cabaret Metro, Chicago, Illinois on July 16, 1989.
- The Lost Band (2022) – Recorded at the Cabaret Metro, Chicago, Illinois on June 4, 1993.
- On The Air: Petit Ubu (2022) – Recorded during several radio sessions: (WBAI-FM), New York on June 11, 1993, July 17 & September 12, 1991, and (WFMU) July 28, 1993.
- Sunday (2022) – Recording during a DPK-TV show on June 12, 2022.
- Caligari's Yugo (2022) – Recorded at the Festivalna Dvorna, Ljubljana (Yugoslavia) on April 20, 1988.
- Beatitude (2023) – Recording at the BBMIX Festival, Boulogne-Billancourt, France on November 26, 2022.
- Grand Guignol (2023) – Recorded at the Borderline, London, England on May 19, 2018.
- We Do What We Do (2023) – Recorded at the Electric Ballroom, London, England on November 23, 1978.

=== Compilations ===
- Terminal Tower (1985) – Nonlp singles & b-sides 1975-1980
- The Hearpen Singles 1975-1977 (2016)
- Coed Jail! (2016) – A ten songs collection from the five first albums, 2 songs per album. Only sold during the Coed Jail! Tour (2016)

=== Box sets ===
- The Hearpen Singles (1995) – 45rpm box set including replicas of the four Hearpen Records singles
- Datapanik in Year Zero (1996)
- Elitism for the People 1975-1978 (2015) – Remastered vinyl box set including "The Hearpen Singles 1975-1977", "The Modern Dance", "Dub Housing" & "Manhattan", a bonus disc recorded live at Max's Kansas City (New York/USA) in 1977 – Longbox cd edition in 2023
- Architecture of Language 1979-1982 (2016) – Remastered vinyl box set including "New Picnic Time", "The Art Of Walking", "Song of The Bailing Man" & "Architectural Salvage", a bonus disc of nonlp singles & alternative mixes – Longbox cd edition in 2023
- Drive, He Said 1994-2002 (2017) – Remastered vinyl box set including "Raygun Suitcase", "Pennsylvania", "St Arkansas" & "Back Roads", a bonus disc of songs that do not fit in the vinyl format, hidden tracks, alternative mixes & live track
- Les Haricots Sont Pas Salés 1987-1991 (2018) – Remastered vinyl box set including "The Tenement Year", "Cloudland", "Worlds In Collision" & "Songs from the Lost Album", a bonus disc of B-sides & two "Cloudland" songs that do not fit in the vinyl format

=== Singles and EPs ===
- 30 Seconds Over Tokyo (b/w Heart of Darkness) (1975) – First Hearpen Records single
- Final Solution (b/w Cloud 149) (1976) – Second Hearpen Records single
- Street Waves (b/w My Dark Ages (I Don't Get Around)) (1976) – Third Hearpen Records single
- The Modern Dance (b/w Heaven) (1977) – Fourth Hearpen Records single. This single version of "The Modern Dance" is not the same mix as the subsequent album and all reissues of the track (with the railroad spike). This makes this single (with the doll squeak) the only place to find the original mix
- Datapanik in the Year Zero (1978) Maxi-single including some songs from the Hearpen singles and an unreleased track, Untitled
- The Fabulous Sequel (Have Shoes Will Walk) (b/w Humor Me (Live) and The Book Is On The Table) (1979)
- Datapanik in the Year Zero-A (Final Solution b/w My Dark Ages (I Don't Get Around)) (1980)
- Not Happy (b/w Lonesome Cowboy Dave) (1981)
- We Have the Technology (1988) – All singles between 1988 and 1991 were released in différent formats (7", 12", cd-single) with multi-b-sides
- Waiting for Mary (What Are We Doing Here) (1989)
- Love Love Love (1989)
- Breath (1989)
- I Hear They Smoke the Barbecue (1990)
- Oh Catherine (1991)
- Folly of Youth See Dee + (1995) – Enhanced CD EP
- B Each B Oys See Dee + (1996) – Enhanced CD EP
- Slow Walking Daddy (b/w Sad-TXT (live)) (2002)
- Irene (b/w Moonstruck) (2014) – Digital-only single
- Golden Surf II (b/w Throb Array)(2014) – Digital-only single
- The Radio Shall Set You Free (Dark Radio Edit) (2021) – Digital-only single

=== Other releases & collaborations ===
- Soldier-Talk (1979) – Pere Ubu (Thomas-Herman-Krauss-Ravenstine-Maimone) as a backing-band in this Mayo Thompson's Red Crayola album
- Closer to the Wall (1988) – Guest appearance by Pere Ubu (Thomas-Ravenstine-Jones-Krauss-Cutler-Maimone) on this live track of the Miracle Legion album Glad. Recorded 11/7/1987 at The Ritz Ballroom (New York City/USA)
- The Geography of Sound in the Magnetic Age (2003) – A book written in English/Italian with a bonus cd-single with two unreleased live tracks : Humor Me (1978) and Birdies (1981)
- Why I Remix Women (2006) – Songs from Why I Hate Women remixed by members of the band. This is a companion to the studio album

== Charting singles ==
Year	Title	Chart positions		Album
Year	Title	US Modern Rock	UK	Album
1989	"Waiting for Mary"	6	—	Cloudland
1989	"Love Love Love"	—	88	Cloudland
