= Plaza Apartments (Cleveland) =

- U.S. National Register of Historic Places
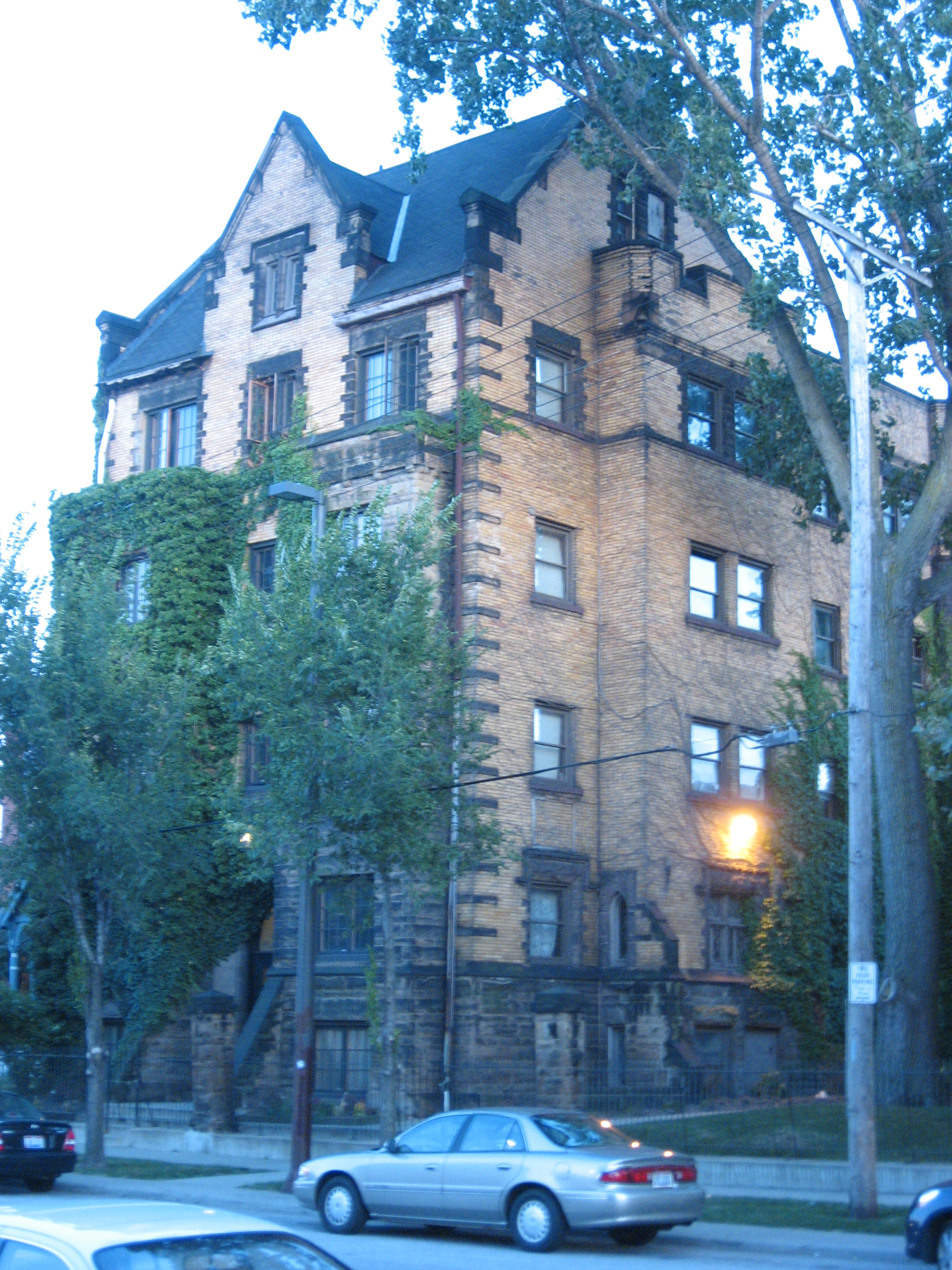

- Location within Cleveland Location within Ohio Location within the United States
- Location: 3206 Prospect Avenue, Cleveland, Ohio, United States
- Coordinates: 41°30′4″N 81°39′53″W
- Built: 1901
- Architect: Steffens, Searles & Hirsh
- MPS: Upper Prospect MRA
- NRHP reference No.: 84000233
- Added to NRHP: November 1, 1984

The Plaza Apartments is a historic five-story apartment building in the Central neighborhood of Cleveland, Ohio, United States. Now known as Plaza Suites, it sits a quarter-mile (400 m) from the Cleveland State University campus.

Built in 1901, it was designed by the architectural firm of Steffens, Searles & Hirsh, which built many middle-class apartment buildings in the area around the turn of the twentieth century. It has a primarily brick facade above a stone foundation; stone also appears in the exterior.

The Plaza was a creative center of Cleveland's arts and music scene during the 1970s and 1980s. The members of Pere Ubu lived in the apartment building, which can be seen on the cover of the band's 1978 album Dub Housing.

On November 1, 1984, it was added to the National Register of Historic Places, primarily for its architectural significance, as part of the multi-building "Upper Prospect Multiple Resource Area" It sits next to the Register-listed Jeremiah Ensworth House.
