= Keith Moliné =

British guitarist and electronic musician

Keith Moliné is a British guitarist and electronic musician, best known for his work in Pere Ubu. He has also performed with David Thomas and Two Pale Boys, Infidel, They Came from the Stars I Saw Them, and Prescott. He uses Roland, Variax and Fernandes Sustainer technology, allowing him to produce numerous overlapping instrument voicings within the context of "live" playing.
