= Tony Maimone =

American musician (born 1952)

- Born: 27 September 1952 (age 73)
- Genres: Rock, post-punk
- Instrument: Bass guitar
- Years active: Mid-1970s–present

Tony Maimone (born September 27, 1952) is an American bass guitarist, producer, and recording engineer, who lives in Brooklyn, New York.

He was a member of Pere Ubu from the mid-1970s to the early 1990s, often playing with the drummer Scott Krauss. They were dubbed by a critic "one of the great unheralded rhythm sections in all of rock". He is known as one of the former members of They Might Be Giants from 1992 until 1995.

Maimone has also worked with Bob Mould, Frank Black, The Mekons and Jon Langford.

Maimone currently resides in Brooklyn, New York, where he owns and operates Studio G Brooklyn, a recording studio with Joel Hamilton. He has produced and/or engineered/played on albums for artists including No Grave Like The Sea, The Book of Knots, Ani DiFranco, The Dixons and The Shondes, Felili, Destronauts, Laura Brennemen, Will James, Bob Kidney, Lord Ward, Peg Simone, Gachupin, Jon Langford, Cock Lorge, Sam Johnson, Steve Northeast, Shark?, Golem, And The Wiremen, Revel Switch, Mike Watt, Megan Reilly, Zigitros, Fai Baba and CC Carana.

Currently, he is playing with Megan Reilly, Home and Garden, Book Of Knots, CC Carana, Sasha Dobson, and No Grave Like The Sea.

== Selected LP discography ==
- Pere Ubu, The Modern Dance (1978)
- Pere Ubu, Dub Housing (1978)
- Pere Ubu, New Picnic Time (1979)
- Pere Ubu, The Art of Walking (1980)
- Pere Ubu, 390 Degrees of Simulated Stereo. Ubu Live: Volume One (1981)
- Pere Ubu, Song of the Bailing Man (1982)
- Home and Garden, History and Geography (1984)
- David Thomas and the Pedestrians, More Places Forever (1985)
- David Thomas and the Wooden Birds, Blame the Messenger (1987)
- Pere Ubu, The Tenement Year (1988)
- Bob Mould, Workbook (1989)
- Pere Ubu, One Man Drives While the Other Man Screams (1989)
- Pere Ubu, Cloudland (1989)
- The World of Skin, Ten Songs for Another World (1990)
- Bob Mould, Black Sheets of Rain (1990)
- Pere Ubu, Worlds in Collision (1990)
- Pere Ubu, Story of My Life (1993)
- The Killer Shrews, ST (1993)
- They Might Be Giants, John Henry (1994)
- Drumhead, ST (1998)
- The Book Of Knots, ST (2004)
- Battle of Mice, A Day of Nights (2006)
- The Book of Knots, Traineater (2007)
- And the Wiremen, And the Wiremen (2010)
- The Book of Knots, Garden of Fainting Stars (2011)
- They Might Be Giants, John Henry Demos (2018) (was recorded in 1993)
- MRT, ST (2019)
