= Tim Wright (bassist) =

American bassist (1952–2013)

Tim Wright

Tim Wright (1952 – August 4, 2013) was an American musician. He was the original bassist with the Cleveland, Ohio band Pere Ubu, appearing on their earliest singles but leaving the band before they recorded a full-length album. Wright moved to New York City, where he joined Arto Lindsay in the no wave band DNA. He stayed with the group until they disbanded in 1982. Wright also contributed to My Life in the Bush of Ghosts (1981) by Brian Eno and David Byrne. Timothy Wright was born in Cleveland, Ohio in 1952. He died of cancer on August 4, 2013, aged 61.
