= Peter Laughner =

American guitarist, songwriter and singer (1952–1977)

- Peter Laughner, right, with David Thomas

Background information
- Born: Peter Ravenscroft Laughner; August 22, 1952; Bay Village, Ohio, United States
- Died: June 22, 1977 (aged 24) Cleveland, Ohio, United States
- Genres: Rock; acoustic; proto-punk; garage rock
- Occupations: Singer-songwriter; guitarist
- Instrument: Guitar
- Years active: 1968–1977
- Formerly of: Rocket from the Tombs; Pere Ubu; Friction; Cinderella Backstreet

Peter Laughner (August 22, 1952 – June 22, 1977) was an American guitarist, songwriter and singer.

A native of Bay Village, Ohio, Laughner was described by Richie Unterberger as "probably the single biggest catalyst in the birth of Cleveland's alternative rock scene in the mid 1970s."

== Music career ==
Laughner led a variety of groups. Among them were Mr. Charlie, Cinderella Backstreet, Peter & The Wolves, The Blue Drivers, and Friction. However, his most enduring contributions were to Rocket From The Tombs and the early work of Pere Ubu. In addition to all this, he wrote for Creem magazine.

Laughner was a voracious rock fan and writer, and was heavily influenced by the writings of Lester Bangs. Like Bangs, Laughner admired Lou Reed, but also drew inspiration from folk and blues figures such as Robert Johnson and Woody Guthrie. Tom Verlaine was also one of Laughner's idols.

Laughner admired the early New York punk scene, routinely hanging around prominent CBGB figures like Patti Smith, Richard Hell and Tom Verlaine during the early 1970s. He had reportedly auditioned to replace Richard Hell in Television and was responsible for organizing the band's first gig outside NYC, which was played in Cleveland, Ohio.

== Death ==
Laughner had severe drug and alcohol abuse problems, which were self-attributed to his emulation of rock heroes like Lou Reed. This behavior contributed to his bandmates in Pere Ubu bringing up concerns regarding his unreliability, which led him to leave the band in 1976. He subsequently joined the writing staff of Creem alongside Lester Bangs. Laughner's drug abuse ultimately led to his death from acute pancreatitis on June 22, 1977 at the age of 24. Lester Bangs wrote a eulogy for him, simply titled "Peter Laughner is Dead".

Rumors to the effect that Laughner was despondent, even suicidal, at the time of his death have been contradicted by Laughner's last known message, written and mailed to Cleveland singer Ruby Port on the evening prior to his death. This letter revealed his intent to move to a retreat in the Ohio countryside, where he could write new music as well as rest and regain his health.

== Recordings ==
Laughner's only known entrance into a recording studio was for the Pere Ubu single sessions, though he left behind countless lo-fi live, rehearsal, and demo recordings. In 1994, Tim/Kerr label released Take the Guitar Player for a Ride, a 15-track LP drawn from these tapes, later re-released as a CD. This compilation sold poorly and has since gone out of print. Fans continue to circulate bootleg recordings and a Cleveland-based label, Handsome Productions, offers a comprehensive collection of his music on CD, officially endorsed by his estate.

In June 2019, the Smog Veil record label released a 5-disc Laughner box set (with tapes procured from Handsome Productions, Pere Ubu's David Thomas, Tim Wright, and others).

In addition to solo recordings, Laughner's live guitar and vocal work is available in the posthumous Rocket from the Tombs album The Day the Earth Met the Rocket from the Tombs. Additionally, on October 3, 1973, Laughner performed as a live musical guest on the weekly Coffee Break Concert series, broadcast over WMMS in Cleveland.

== Influence and legacy ==
In 2023 Stone Church Press (now Church Ghost) published the graphic history AIN'T IT FUN: Peter Laughner & Proto-Punk in the Secret City by Aaron Lange. AIN'T IT FUN weaves Laughner's biography into the history of Cleveland and the birth of punk rock.

The Mountain Goats included the song "Arguing With The Ghost Of Peter Laughner About His Coney Island Baby Review" on the 2021 album Dark in Here.
