= Allen Ravenstine =

- Born: May 9, 1950 (age 75); United States
- Genres: Experimental rock, new wave, art rock
- Occupation(s): Musician, aviator
- Instrument(s): EML synthesizers, saxophone
- Years active: 1975–1991; 2004; 2012–present
- Labels: Rough Trade, Fontana

Allen Ravenstine (born May 9, 1950) is an American keyboard player, most recognized for his work in the experimental rock group Pere Ubu. In 1991, he quit music to become a commercial airline pilot.

== History ==
=== Early years ===
Allen Ravenstine was born on May 9, 1950. He had much exposure to music at a young age: his mother played recordings by Sergei Rachmaninoff and other classical music, while his father played jazz and percussion records. He played the trombone in grade school but quickly lost interest. Ravenstine's first real experience as an artist came in 1971 after abandoning his college pursuits. He met visual artist Bob Bensick, who was experimenting with sending distortion into oscillators and out to a stereo system. Eventually, they discovered a way to attach lights and have them work in conjunction with the sounds being produced and decided to stage art shows. The act was short-lived; Ravenstine moved out of the area and lost contact with Bensick. Soon after, Ravenstine purchased his first synthesizer, an ElectroComp EML 200, and began associating with the garage band Rocket from the Tombs and recording their performances.

Ravenstine owned an apartment building, the Plaza Apartments, in Downtown Cleveland; it served as home and gathering place for the developing art and music scene in Cleveland in the early 1970s.

=== Pere Ubu ===
Ravenstine first worked with Pere Ubu in 1975 after being asked to contribute to the band's recording of "30 Seconds Over Tokyo". However, he was discouraged by the thought of having to perform live shows and discontinued his involvement with the band. After watching Pere Ubu perform at a few venues, Ravenstine changed his mind and returned as a full-time member of the band, replacing keyboardist Dave Taylor. He continued to work with Pere Ubu until the 1989 release of Cloudland, after which he left the group and pursue his own interests.

=== Later life ===
Ravenstine obtained a pilot's license after Ubu's initial breakup, and after leaving the band permanently, worked as a flight instructor and charter pilot. He also completed a novel that was never published. Ravenstine largely avoided musical activity of any kind after leaving Pere Ubu, once making a guest appearance at a Red Krayola show in Los Angeles in 2004. In 2012, an invitation to contribute to I Dream of Wires: The Modular Synthesizer Documentary led to the recording of an impromptu duo performance on the EML-101 and 200 synthesizers, with current Ubu synthesist Robert Wheeler. Culled from this were a pair of albums and singles, entitled City Desk/Farm Report, which were self-released in 2013. On June 29, 2018, he released a solo album entitled Waiting for the Bomb on Recommended Records.

== Influence ==
In reviewing Dub Housing, critic John Dougan writes, "Ravenstine, who may be one of the all-time great synth players, colors the sound with ominous whooshes of distortions, blips, and blurbs that sound like a sped-up Pong game."
