= Jim Jones (guitarist) =

American musician

James E. Jones (March 12, 1950 – February 18, 2008) was an experimental music artist, producer, and guitarist in the rock band Pere Ubu. Jones was a member of many experimental rock bands of the 1970s and 1980s including: Easter Monkeys, Foreign Bodies, Mirrors, The Styrenes, Electric Eels, Home And Garden, and Terminal Lovers. He later recorded and performed with local bands Speaker\Cranker, Noble Rot, and KNG NXN. Jones died of a heart attack on February 18, 2008 at the age of 57.

== Sources ==
- Cleveland.com obituary
- UbuProjex.net bio
