= Variations on a Theme (David Thomas album) =

Studio album by David Thomas & The Pedestrians with Richard Thompson
- Released: June 1983
- Recorded: March 1983
- Studio: Suma (Painesville, Ohio)
- Genre: Art rock
- Length: 38:04
- Label: Rough Trade
- Producer: David Thomas

David Thomas chronology
Winter Comes Home (1982)	Variations on a Theme (1983)	More Places Forever (1985)

Richard Thompson chronology
Shoot Out the Lights (1982)	Variations on a Theme (1983)	Hand of Kindness (1983)

Professional ratings
Review scores
Source	Rating
Allmusic	4/5 stars
Robert Christgau	B

Variations on a Theme is the second studio album by experimental singer-songwriter David Thomas, released in May 1983 by Rough Trade Records. Like its predecessor The Sound of the Sand, Variations on a Theme features prominent guitar work from Richard Thompson. In 1997, the album was remastered by Paul Hamann and David Thomas for its inclusion in the Monster anthology box set. It was the only album in the set to be remixed, and its running order was changed.

== Track listing ==
All lyrics are written by David Thomas.

Side one
No.	Title	Music	Length
1.	"A Day at the Botanical Gardens"	David Thomas	3:21
2.	"Pedestrian Walk"	David Thomas, Eddie Thornton	4:34
3.	"Bird Town"	Richard Thompson	2:43
4.	"The Egg & I"	Anton Fier	2:55
5.	"Who Is It?"	Lindsay Cooper, Chris Cutler	3:39

Side two
No.	Title	Music	Length
1.	"Song of Hoe"	David Thomas	6:03
2.	"Hurry Back"	Jim Jones	4:19
3.	"The Rain"	Chris Cutler, Anton Fier	5:17
4.	"Semaphore"	Lindsay Cooper, Chris Cutler, Jack Monck	5:13

== Personnel ==
Adapted from the Variations on a Theme liner notes.

The Pedestrians

- Anton Fier – drums
- Paul Hamann – bass guitar, engineering
- Jim Jones – guitar
- Jack Monck – guitar
- David Thomas – lead vocals
- Richard Thompson – guitar

Additional musicians

- Lindsay Cooper – bassoon (A5, B3, B4)
- Chris Cutler – drums (A5, B3, B4)

Production and additional personnel

- Ken Hamann – engineering
- Adam Kidron – engineering (A5, B3, B4)
- Mary Thomas – cover art, illustrations
- Robert Vogel – engineering

== Release history ==
Region	Date	Label	Format	Catalog
United Kingdom	1983	Rough Trade	LP	ROUGH 60
United States	1983	Sixth International	LP	Silo2
