= Blame the Messenger =

Studio album by David Thomas & The Wooden Birds
- Released: January 1987
- Recorded: September 23–24, 1986
- Studio: Suma (Painesville, Ohio)
- Genre: Art rock, experimental rock
- Length: 39:18
- Label: Rough Trade/Twin/Tone
- Producer: Chris Cutler

David Thomas chronology
Monster Walks the Winter Lake (1986)	Blame the Messenger (1987)	Erewhon (1996)

Professional ratings
Review scores
Source	Rating
Allmusic	4/5 stars
Robert Christgau	C+

Blame the Messenger is the fifth studio album by experimental singer-songwriter David Thomas, released in January 1987 by Rough Trade and Twin/Tone Records. In 1997, the album was remastered by Paul Hamann and David Thomas for its inclusion in the Monster anthology box set.

== Track listing ==
All lyrics are written by David Thomas; all music is composed by Chris Cutler, Jim Jones, Tony Maimone and Allen Ravenstine, except "My Town" and "Friends of Stone" by David Thomas.

Side one
No.	Title	Length
1.	"My Town"	3:07
2.	"A Fact About Trains"	4:23
3.	"King Knut"	5:30
4.	"When Love Is Uneven"	3:29
5.	"The Storm Breaks"	3:35

Side two
No.	Title	Length
1.	"The Long Rain"	4:13
2.	"Having Time"	4:53
3.	"Friends of Stone"	3:18
4.	"The Velikovsky 2-Step"	6:50

== Personnel ==
Adapted from the Monster Walks the Winter Lake liner notes.

The Wooden Birds

- Chris Cutler – drums, production
- Jim Jones – electric guitar, acoustic guitar, backing vocals
- Tony Maimone – electric bass guitar, acoustic bass guitar, backing vocals
- Allen Ravenstine – EML synthesizer, piano, backing vocals
- David Thomas – lead vocals, accordion

Production and additional personnel

- Michael Bishop – mastering
- Paul Hamann – engineering
- Mik Mellen – cover art
- John Thompson – design

== Release history ==
Region	Date	Label	Format	Catalog
United Kingdom	1987	Rough Trade	LP	ROUGH 120
United States	1987	Twin/Tone	LP	TTR 87105
