= Monster Walks the Winter Lake =

Studio album by David Thomas & The Wooden Birds
- Released: March 1986
- Recorded: November 18–21, 1985
- Studio: Suma (Painesville, Ohio)
- Genre: Art rock, experimental rock
- Length: 35:58
- Label: Twin/Tone
- Producer: Paul Hamann

David Thomas chronology
More Places Forever (1985)	Monster Walks the Winter Lake (1986)	Blame the Messenger (1987)

Professional ratings
Review scores
Source	Rating
AllMusic	3/5 stars
Robert Christgau	B

Monster Walks the Winter Lake is the fourth studio album by experimental singer-songwriter David Thomas, released in March 1986 by Twin/Tone Records. In 1997, the album was remastered by Paul Hamann and David Thomas for its inclusion in the Monster anthology box set.

== Track listing ==
All lyrics are written by David Thomas.

Side one
No.	Title	Music	Length
1.	"My Theory of Spontaneous Simultude"	Daved Hild, Tony Maimone, Allen Ravenstine, Garo Yellin	3:07
2.	"What Happened to Me"	David Thomas	2:48
3.	"Monster Walks the Winter Lake"	Daved Hild	11:15
4.	"Bicycle"	Tony Maimone	4:18
5.	"Coffee Train"	Allen Ravenstine	2:24
6.	"My Town"	David Thomas	3:17
7.	"Monster Magee, King of the Seas"	David Thomas	2:15
8.	"Monster Thinks About the Good Days"	Tony Maimone	3:39
9.	"What Happened to Me"	David Thomas	2:40

== Personnel ==
Adapted from the Monster Walks the Winter Lake liner notes.

The Wooden Birds

- Daved Hild – percussion (1, 2, 9), backing vocals (2, 9), accordion (3)
- Tony Maimone – bass guitar, drums (5, 8), piano (5), horns (5)
- Allen Ravenstine – EML synthesizer
- David Thomas – lead vocals, accordion (2, 3, 5–7, 9)
- Garo Yellin – cello (1–3, 9)

Additional musicians

- Roz Ilett – accordion (4)

Production and additional personnel

- Paul Hamann – production, recording, mixing, editing
- John Thompson – cover art
- Marshall J. Wolf – design

== Release history ==
Region	Date	Label	Format	Catalog
United States	1986	Twin/Tone	CD, LP	TTR 8667
United Kingdom	1986	Rough Trade	LP	ROUGH 90
