= The Art of Walking =

Studio album by Pere Ubu
- Released: June 1980
- Recorded: January 1980
- Studio: Suma (Painesville, Ohio)
- Genres: Post-punk; experimental rock
- Label: Rough Trade
- Producer: Paul Hamann

Pere Ubu chronology
New Picnic Time (1979)	The Art of Walking (1980)	390° of Simulated Stereo (1981)

The Art of Walking is the fourth studio album by the American rock band Pere Ubu, released in June 1980 by Rough Trade Records. After the departure of guitarist Tom Hermann, the band was reformed with Mayo Thompson of the Red Krayola.

== Background ==
After the departure of founding member Tom Hermann following an American tour of the band's previous album, New Picnic Time. Pere Ubu briefly disbanded. A few months later, David Thomas and Allen Ravenstine attended a Talking Heads concert, where Thomas remarked to Ravenstine, "We were better than these guys." Ravenstine replied: "Mayo Thompson."

In late 1979, Pere Ubu invited Mayo Thompson of the Red Krayola as a guitarist, who they had previously toured England and collaborated with in 1978. The addition of Thompson bent the group further towards deconstruction and abstraction, and away from "rock and roll" which Herman's guitar work had facilitated. Thomas stated the concept of the album was stumbled upon in the bathtub:

I remember sitting in the bathtub. As the water drained I saw the funnel shape it took was defined by the empty center. In other words, it was defined by what wasn't there. I wanted to do an album defined by what wasn't stated.

The album's title was chosen after a fan criticized the band for writing too many songs about driving. Pere Ubu would record one more album with Thompson, alongside Feelies drummer Anton Fier, titled Song of the Bailing Man, before disbanding due to creative differences.

== Recording and music ==
The album was recorded in January 1980 at Suma Recording. It was the first Pere Ubu studio album recorded by Paul Hamann; previous Pere Ubu albums were produced and recorded by Ken Hamann, who retired in 1979 and was replaced by his son.

On the track "Lost in Art", Scott Krauss and Tony Maimone performed a jam session on the keyboards and recorded it on the tape machine. In response, David Thomas stated, "What am I supposed to do with that!?" Thomas told Paul Hamann to turn on the drum mics and he recorded the drums and vocals in one take. Thomas drew a smiley face with devil's horns and the slogan in the control room tagged: "Self-expression is evil".

Thompson later stated of the performance, "[Lost in Art] the band is playing something smooth and he [David Thomas] picks up a drum stick and he's playing the snare drum and he's yelling "really grooving!" and all this and he's hilarious". The song "Horses" on the album had originally been written by Thompson and appeared on his solo album Corky's Debt to His Father from 1970.

== Critical reception ==
Professional ratings
Review scores
Source	Rating
AllMusic	3/5 stars
Robert Christgau	B+
The Rolling Stone Album Guide	3/5 stars

The Art of Walking was released in June 1980 and reportedly sold better than any other Pere Ubu release up to that point, though it still wasn't a massive success. In 1980, Chris Cutler reviewed the album for Melody Maker, writing: "Ubu are moving even further from the conventions of rock music - and from their own past - but still moving forward, without a doubt, and losing none of their integrity as a group. Much of the music operates like a loose-bound net, where apparently hardly connected parts can co-exist, somehow still adding up at the end to an irreducible whole... this is a record of unique beauty - a beauty marked by truth and thus also tragic and sometimes painful."

Ian Penman, writing in NME on August 30, 1980, stated: "It is obvious that (the history of) Pere Ubu should not be thought of in terms of a linear development - reducing its entire operation and presence to an exclusive concern for 'working and succeeding in rock and roll. Unfortunately, most criticism - of Pere Ubu, of many other folks - assumes that words have one meaning, that desires point in a single direction, that ideas are logical; it ignores the fact that the world of language, noise and desire is one of lack, insecurity, interruption, struggle, blundering, disguises, ploys, embarrassed grins."

Dave McCullough, writing for Sounds on August 30, 1980, commented: "So, things being as they are, we're supposed to keep our eyes firmly closed (lest they reveal the relative dirgeness of all else) when a record as exciting and as funnily subversive as The Art of Walking comes around... If [it] is difficult then I'm much much cleverer than I thought, and every other 'successful' music I've heard this year in comparison must be roughly equivalent to sticking your thumb in your mouth and sucking long and hard... The only way [it] isn't a record full of much excitement, fun and compelling interest is if you don't want it to be so.

Trouser Press noted the "ditzy-but-compelling aura of The Art of Walking, rife as it is with hymns of praise to life’s mundane moments. Like a fourth- dimensional doppelgänger for Jonathan Richman, Thomas warbles his thoughts on 'Birdies' and 'Arabia' (with hastily scribbled lyrics appended to what was originally intended to be an instrumental), while Thompson paints the landscapes in dazzlingly shiny — if occasionally unnatural — colors."

== Track listing ==
All tracks are written by Pere Ubu (David Thomas, Tony Maimone, Mayo Thompson, Allen Ravenstine and Scott Krauss), except where noted.

No.	Title	Writer(s)	Length
1.	"Go"		3:34
2.	"Rhapsody in Pink"		3:35
3.	"Arabia"		4:58
4.	"Young Miles in the Basement"		4:20
5.	"Misery Goats"		2:37
6.	"Loop"		3:14
7.	"Rounder"		3:25
8.	"Birdies"		2:27
9.	"Lost in Art"		5:11
10.	"Horses"	Mayo Thompson	2:34
11.	"Crush This Horn"		3:00
Total length:			38:55

== Legacy ==
A performance of the song "Birdies" was featured in the 1982 film Urgh! A Music War.

== Personnel ==
Pere Ubu

- David Thomas – lead vocals (1–5, 7–9, 11), Vox Continental Baroque organ, drums (9)
- Mayo Thompson – guitar, backing and lead (6, 10) vocals, piano
- Allen Ravenstine – EML synthesizers
- Tony Maimone – bass, piano, organ
- Scott Krauss – drums (all but 9), horn, piano, drum machine

Technical

- Paul Hamann – engineer, producer
- John Thompson – cover design

== Release history ==
An error in the first U.S. pressing resulted in a vocal overdub mix being used of "Arabia" - the original UK pressing used the correct instrumental mix. The first Rough Trade CD edition also used the accidental second mix, but the remastering on the Datapanik box set restored the correct version. The individual remastered disc issued subsequently included both (titling the vocal version "Arabian Nights"). Later editions of the album also changed the title of "Miles" to "Young Miles in the Basement."

Region	Date	Label	Format	Catalog no.
UK	1980	Rough Trade	LP	ROUGH 17
USA	1980	Rough Trade	LP	ROUGH US 7
Europe	1999	Cooking Vinyl	CD	COOK CD 184
USA	1999	Thirsty Ear	CD	THI 57046.2
Italy	2001	Get Back	LP	GET 58
Europe	2010	Cooking Vinyl	CD	COOK CD 529
