= Michael Weston King =

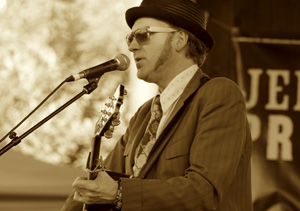
- Michael Weston King performing at the SXSW festival in Austin in 2013

Background information
- Born: 11 November 1961 (age 64); Derbyshire, England
- Genres: Country, alt country
- Occupations: Musician, songwriter, producer
- Instruments: Vocals, guitar
- Years active: 1984–present
- Website: michaelwestonking.com

Michael Weston King (born 11 November 1961) is an English singer and songwriter who formed the British country music duo My Darling Clementine and was formerly the leader of Alt country band The Good Sons.

== Life and career ==
=== Early career (1970s – 1991) ===
Michael Weston King was born in Derbyshire, England in 1961 but was raised in the Lancastrian seaside town of Southport. King left school when he was 18 and moved to nearby Liverpool to build for himself a musical career. He played guitar as a member of various bands on the edge of the late 70s/early 80s Liverpool post punk scene, most notably with the band he formed with Chas Cole, Fragile Friends, performing at the famed Eric's club just prior to its closure, and leaving two singles and one cassette only album.

By the mid '80s, inspired by the latest wave of overseas bands such as R.E.M., Green on Red, The Dream Syndicate and The Triffids, whose influences mirrored his own newly found interest in Gram Parsons, Hank Williams, The Byrds, as well as the new wave of country acts such as Lyle Lovett, Dwight Yoakam and Nanci Griffith, King joined the country rock band Gary Hall and The Stormkeepers. They played together until the band disintegrated in 1991.

=== The Good Sons ===
Taking their name from the Nick Cave album, The Good Son, King formed The Good Sons in 1992 as an authentic British alternative to the burgeoning alt country movement.

In 1995 they signed to the German label Glitterhouse Records and released their debut album, Singing the Glory Down, which earned a good reception from both critics and the British alt-country scene of the time. The album featured a guest appearance by Townes Van Zandt with whom Michael had toured Europe in 1994 and 1995, singing together "Riding on the Range" as a duet. The band went on to open for the likes of Joe Ely, Blue Rodeo and Joe Henry. In 1996 they released the album The Kings Highway, and then in 1997 Wines, Lines and Valentines.

The Good Sons had ceased to perform in 1999 and King chose to record his debut solo album, God Shaped Hole. The album got released in October 1999, on Glitterhouse Records. The album included the Phil Ochs song "No More Songs", and a tribute to the now late Townes Van Zandt "Lay Me Down".

Following a series of solo tours around Europe, King reconvened the Good Sons to record their fourth album Happiness in early 2001. The relative failure of the album led to a more permanent break-up of the band.

=== Solo career ===
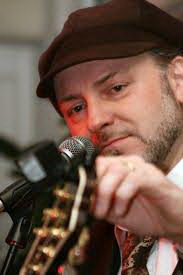
Michael Weston King performing on stage in The Netherlands.

In 2002, and after 200 solo shows across Europe and America, King released Live...In Dinky Town, a collection of live and solo performances gathered shows in Hamburg, Austin, Amsterdam, Bilbao and Manchester. The album also featured contributions from Jackie Leven and Andy White.

The follow-up album A Decent Man produced by Jackie Leven featured guests, including former Icicle Works front man, Ian McNabb.

2004 saw the release of Cosmic Fireworks-The Best of The Good Sons (1994–2001), on the German label Phantasmagoria.

In 2005, Michael Weston King released the album The Tender Place: A Collection 1999–2005, which put together his best solo creations from A Decent Man and God Shaped Hole albums.

The end of 2008 saw the release of a third live album, Crawling Through The USA, recorded during his 2007 and 2008 tours of North America, while work on a pure 'country duets' album, with singer Lou Dalgleish, under the name of My Darling Clementine.

The songbook Beautiful Lies – The Songs of Michael Weston King was published in 2005. A collaboration with the Irish writer Brian Richmond resulted in a play entitled Happy Infidels, which features 12 songs by King and is based around the lives and loves, hopes and fears, and personal disasters of a young aspiring English musician and a road weary, alcoholic American musician touring across Europe. King wrote and appeared in They Call Her Natasha, with his wife Lou Dalgleish, a musical play, based around the songs of Elvis Costello which was performed at the Edinburgh Festival, and various theatres around the UK.

=== My Darling Clementine ===
In 2011, the album he had made in 2009, under the band name My Darling Clementine saw its UK release. Entitled How Do You Plead, it was hailed by Country Music People as the "greatest country album ever by a British artist". Produced by Neil Brockbank (Nick Lowe), it featured, amongst others, Geraint Watkins and Martin Belmont. The debut single, "100,000 Words" became a BBC Radio 2 hit, and the album was voted Album of the Year by CMP, Maverick, & 3rd Coast Music Texas, while the British Country Music Association (BCMA) awarded the band "Americana Band of the Year".

My Darling Clementine's second release The Reconciliation? was recorded at the Sheffield studio, Yellow Arch Studios and was produced by Colin Elliot (Richard Hawley, Duane Eddy) and features guest appearances from Kinky Friedman, The Brodsky Quartet & The Richard Hawley band.

In 2015, they collaborated with crime writer Mark Billingham to create the story and song album The Other Half, which is also an audiobook and stage show. The album featured actor David Morrissey and musician Graham Parker and was published / released by Hachette Audio. To date, there have been over 150 performances of the show, including a run at the Assembly Rooms during the Edinburgh Festival in 2015.

In 2017 My Darling Clementine released the more country soul orientated album Still Testifying which was recorded in London and produced again by Neil Brockbank (Nick Lowe),(Jim Lauderdale). It was launched with an appearance on BBC Radio 2 with Bob Harris and released by the Dutch record label CRS.

Most recently they have collaborated with Steve Nieve on a series of 4 track Ep's called Country Darkness ' re-interpreting the songs of Elvis Costello for duet

=== Social activism ===
2010 saw the release of King's latest solo album, a collection of protest songs entitled I Didn't Raise My Boy To Be A Soldier, which addressed the serious issues facing everyday people in such difficult modern times. In the 12 months following its release, King appeared at many public protests, political rallies and human rights events in the UK, Germany, Scandinavia, North America and by May 2011 played his first live shows in China.

== Discography ==
With The Good Sons

- Singing The Glory Down 1995
- The King's Highway 1996
- Wines, Lines And Valentines 1997
- Angels in the End 1998
- Happiness 2001
- Cosmic Fireworks – The Best of The Good Sons(1994–2001)

Solo

- God Shaped Hole 1999
- Live...in Dinky Town 2002
- A Decent Man 2003
- Absent Friends 2004
- The Tender Place 2005
- Love's A Cover 2006
- A New Kind of Loneliness 2007
- Crawling Through The USA 2008
- I Didn't Raise My Boy To Be A Soldier 2010
- Forgetmenots 2011
- The Struggle 2022
- Nothing Can Hurt Me Anymore 2022

With My Darling Clementine

- How Do You Plead? 2011
- The Reconciliation 2013
- The Lucky Bag 2014 (Record Store Day – 10" vinyl EP)
- The Other Half 2015 (with Mark Billingham)
- The Riverbend 2016 (Record Store Day – 10" EP)
- Still Testifying 2017
- Country Darkness Vol 1 EP 2019
- Country Darkness Vol 2 EP 2020
- Country Darkness Vol 3 EP 2020
- Country Darkness - The songs of Elvis Costello 2020
