= My Darling Clementine (duo) =

English country music duo

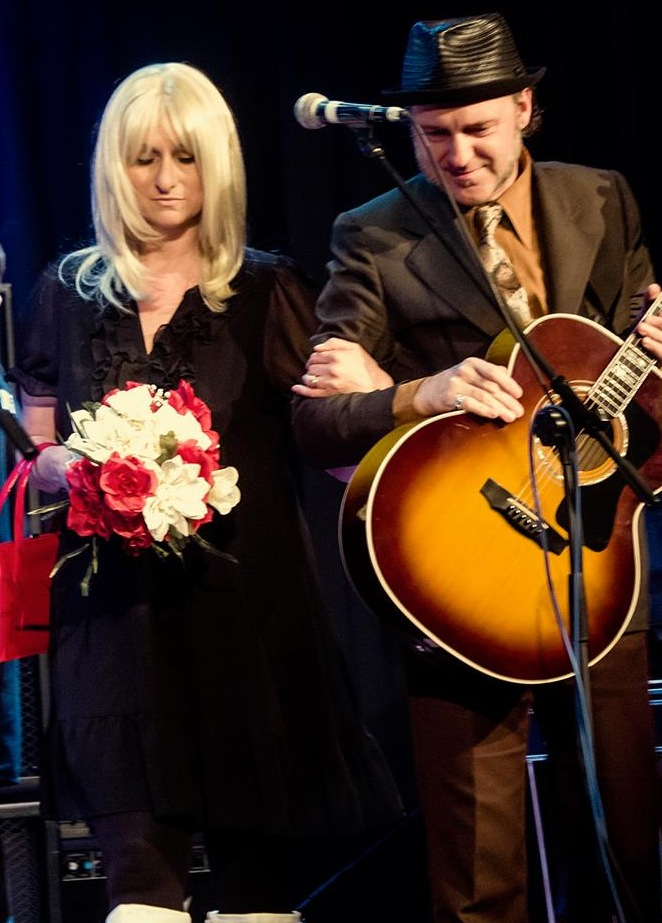
- My Darling Clementine at the Biddulph Town Hall in July 2012

Background information
- Origin: Birmingham, England
- Genre: Country
- Years active: 2010–present
- Members: Lou Dalgleish & Michael Weston King
- Website: mydarlingclementinemusic.co.uk

My Darling Clementine is an English country music duo who formed in 2010 in Birmingham, England.

== History ==
The band was formed by Birmingham-based couple Michael Weston King and Lou Dalgleish. After a decade of marriage, they began to perform together in 2010 as My Darling Clementine.

Prior to My Darling Clementine, Lou Dalgleish worked with Bryan Ferry, Steven Spielberg and The Brodsky Quartet. From 1993 to 2000, she released four albums (including the acclaimed Live at Ronnie Scotts). In 2001, Dalgleish wrote and appeared in the play "They Call Her Natasha", a story of obsession and infatuation, based around a series of Elvis Costello songs, which was first performed at the Edinburgh Festival.

Michael Weston King is the former leader of The Good Sons, who Mojo magazine dubbed as 'England's very own Uncle Tupelo.' King has released 10 solo albums and four more albums with The Good Sons, and has also collaborated with Chris Hillman, Ron Sexsmith, Jackie Leven and Townes Van Zandt (who cut his own version of King's song "Riding The Range").

The instrumental touring band of My Darling Clementine has gathered together renowned British rock, country and blues musicians as guitarist Martin Belmont (Graham Parker & The Rumour, Nick Lowe, Elvis Costello, Ducks Deluxe), keyboardist Liam Grundy (Scotty Moore, James Burton), Bassist Kevin Foster (Jackie Leven, Ducks Deluxe, Los Pistoleros, Doll by Doll), drummer Neil Bullock (Chuck Berry, Ronnie Scott, Broadcast) and Pedal Steel guitarist Alan Cook (Chris Hillman, The Charlatans, Jackie Leven).

They released their first single "100,000 Words", in 2012.

In the same year, My Darling Clementine released their first album, "How do you plead?" The album received good reviews by the BBC, Guardian and went on earn them 2012 Americana Music Artist of the year at the British Country Music Awards

My Darling Clementine released their second album, "The Reconciliation?" in late 2013. The album was recorded at the Sheffield studio, Yellow Arch and produced by Colin Elliot, (Richard Hawley, Duane Eddy, Jarvis Cocker) and features special guest appearances from Kinky Friedman, The Brodsky Quartet & The Richard Hawley band.

In 2014, Michael Weston King and Lou Dalgleish performed a series of UK shows with crime writer Mark Billingham, billed as The Other Half after Billingham wrote his story "The Other Half" so named after one of the duo's songs.

An album of the same name was released in 2015, released by the publisher Little Brown / Hachette. It featured Guest appearances from actor David Morrissey, singer and songwriter Graham Parker, and The Brodsky Quartet. It was featured on BBC Radio 4.

In 2017, they released the soul and gospel influenced album Still Testifying Re-uniting with producer Neil Brockbank and the majority of musicians who appeared on the band's debut album including Martin Belmont, Geraint Watkins, Bob Loveday and newly added horn players Matt Holland, Nick Pentelow and Andy Wood. It was recorded at Gold Top / Gravity Shack in Tooting, South London.

== Musical style ==
My Darling Clementine are influenced by the great American country duos from the 1960s and 1970s like Tammy Wynette and George Jones, or Johnny Cash and June Carter.

== Members ==
Singers

- Michael Weston King – vocals, guitar
- Lou Dalgleish – vocals

Instrumental band

- Martin Belmont – guitar
- Liam Grundy – piano, organ
- Kevin Foster – bass
- Neil Bullock – drums
- Alan Cook – pedal steel guitar

== Discography ==
- How Do You Plead? 2011
- The Reconciliation? 2013
- The Lucky Bag 2014 (Record Store Day – 10" vinyl EP)
- The Other Half 2015 (with Mark Billingham)
- The Riverbend 2016 (Record Store Day – 10" EP)
- Still Testifying 2017
- Country Darkness 2020 (collecting together Country Darkness Vol 1-3 EPs)
