= Dub Housing =

Studio album by Pere Ubu
- Released: November 17, 1978
- Recorded: August–September 1978
- Studio: Suma (Painesville, Ohio)
- Genres: Post-punk; art punk; experimental rock
- Length: 36:46
- Label: Chrysalis
- Producers: Pere Ubu, Ken Hamann

Pere Ubu chronology
The Modern Dance (1978)	Dub Housing (1978)	New Picnic Time (1979)

Dub Housing is the second album by the American rock band Pere Ubu. Released on November 17, 1978 by Chrysalis Records. It has been ranked number eight by NME and number 13 by Sounds on their lists of best albums of 1978.

== Background ==
The title is an allusion to a block of identical row houses in Baltimore, whose appearance was reminiscent of the echo and reverberation effects of dub music. David Thomas said:

The first show of our first tour, the Coed Jail Tour in 1978, was in Baltimore. Where we were driving, all the cross-streets were lined with identical terrace houses. Dub music was playing on the van stereo. "Look," I said, pointing out the window, "Dub housing."

The album cover depicts the Plaza Apartments at 3206 Prospect Avenue in Downtown Cleveland, which was owned by synthesist Allen Ravenstine and inhabited by the members of Pere Ubu and other artists. In the cover image, an additional floor was superimposed atop the building. The cover contains the second appearance of the "Ubu Girl", a model who appeared on the back of February 1978's The Modern Dance and would later appear on the covers of 1979's New Picnic Time and 1996's Datapanik in the Year Zero.

Unlike The Modern Dance, which was made up of standalone songs recorded over time, Dub Housing aimed to create a set of interconnected tracks that worked together as a cohesive whole. Upon release, Pere Ubu manager Cliff Burnstein told the group, "Do two more albums like this and you will be pop stars." During the band's November 1978 tour, Burnstein introduced the band to another group he was managing, Def Leppard, so they could observe how Pere Ubu conducted their soundchecks.

== Music and production ==
Dub Housing was recorded at the Suma Recording studio in Ohio, where most of Pere Ubu’s early material was recorded. The album was later released under the British independent label Chrysalis Records, which had previously contacted the band. However, manager Cliff Burnstein had earlier insisted that their debut album, The Modern Dance, be released instead through a short-lived Mercury Records imprint known as "Blank Records".

The track "Caligari's Mirror" was inspired by the sea-shanty "Drunken Sailor". While "Drinking Wine Spodyody" was a reference to the 1949 blues song "Drinkin' Wine Spo-Dee-O-Dee" by Stick McGhee.

== Reception and legacy ==
Professional ratings
Review scores
Source	Rating
AllMusic	4.5/5 stars
Alternative Press	5/5
Chicago Sun-Times	3.5/4 stars
Chicago Tribune	4/4 stars
Christgau's Record Guide	A
Mojo	4/5 stars
Pitchfork	8.9/10
Record Collector	4/5 stars
The Rolling Stone Album Guide	4.5/5 stars
Spin Alternative Record Guide	10/10

Dub Housing was released on November 17, 1978. At the end of 1978, NME named Dub Housing the year's eighth best album, while Sounds ranked it at number 13 on its year-end list.

Robert Christgau of The Village Voice wrote in 1979, "not only is it abrasive and visionary and eccentric and hard-rocking itself, but it sent me back to The Modern Dance, which I liked fine originally and like more now". In The Village Voice's Pazz & Jop critics' poll for 1979, Dub Housing placed at number nine. The New York Times called Dub Housing "one of the finer recent new-wave records ... well worth hearing."

On November 4, 1978, Jon Savage of Sounds magazine reviewed the album, stating: "A week is a month and you could be forgiven for thinking that the times would catch up with Pere Ubu (and overtake them) as they do so many others... Here, on their second album, Pere Ubu outflank and transcend these pressures. Not gratuitously but through the breadth and consistency of their vision. (I think I like it.) At very first, Dub Housing appears harsh, impenetrable and repellent... it seems to be working on some hidden internal logic, from some parallel (and disquieting) universe. On subsequent listens, the "logic," if indeed the tapping of the subconscious and intuition can be called "logic," becomes clearer; the album remains baffling, infuriating, haunting, menacing and ferociously funny... As in The Modern Dance, they stomp all over "rock n roll's" accepted language and then create, with fire and discipline, one of their own...This album will last."

On November 11, 1978, NME's Ian Penman reviewed the album, excerpt: "Considered in a reasonably recent rock stream, it [Dub Housing] is more aggressively "symphonic" than Henry Cow (deep), but more sympathetically alienated or alienating than The Sex Pistols (shallow). Conventional avant garde music can sometimes be too wrapped up in educated guesswork. Pere Ubu play within terms of a possible resolution, but not into one. People are annoyed by Ubu's accessibility. Or ashamed!"

The album was described by Trouser Press in 2012 as "simply one of the most important post-punk recordings."

The album has been reissued several times: in 1989 on CD by Rough Trade Records, in 1999 on CD by Thirsty Ear Records, in 2008 on CD on Cooking Vinyl, and in 2015 on CD and vinyl by Fire Records.

== Track listing ==
All tracks are written by Pere Ubu (David Thomas, Tom Hermann, Allen Ravenstine, Tony Maimone and Scott Krauss).

No.	Title	Length
1.	"Navvy"	2:40
2.	"On the Surface"	2:35
3.	"Dub Housing"	3:39
4.	"Caligari's Mirror"	3:49
5.	"Thriller!"	4:36
6.	"I, Will Wait"	1:45
7.	"Drinking Wine Spodyody"	2:44
8.	"(Pa) Ubu Dance Party"	4:46
9.	"Blow Daddy-O"	3:38
10.	"Codex"	4:55
Total length:		35:17

== Personnel ==
Pere Ubu

- David Thomas – vocals, organ
- Tom Hermann – guitar, bass, organ
- Tony Maimone – bass, guitar, piano
- Allen Ravenstine – EML synthesizers, saxophone
- Scott Krauss – drums

Technical

- Pere Ubu – production
- Ken Hamann – production, recording, engineering, EQ and mastering
- David Thomas – EQ and mastering
