= Mirror Man =

Mirror Man can refer to:

== Albums and songs ==
- Mirror Man (Captain Beefheart album)
- Mirror Man (David Thomas album)
- "Mirror Man" (Ella Henderson song)
- "Mirror Man" (The Human League song)
- "Mirror Man", a song by Prism from Armageddon
- "Mirror Man", a song by Talk Talk from The Party's Over

== Fiction ==
- Mirror Man (character), a foe of Batman in DC Comics
- Mirror Man, someone with mirrored-self misidentification, i.e. unable to recognize himself in a mirror

== See also ==
- Mirrorman, Japanese TV series aired on Fuji TV in 1971-72
- Man in the Mirror (disambiguation)
