= Winter Comes Home =

Live album by David Thomas
- Released: 1982
- Genre: Art rock
- Length: 46:54
- Label: Recommended Records/ReR Megacorp
- Producer: David Thomas

David Thomas chronology
Vocal Performances (1981)	Winter Comes Home (1982)	Variations on a Theme (1983)

Winter Comes Home is a 1982 live album credited to both David Thomas and his Legs and to 'David Thomas, Lindsay Cooper, Chris Cutler', on which Thomas was supported by Chris Cutler and Lindsay Cooper. Trouser Press reports that the album "mixes intellectual stand-up comedy with winning performances". The album did not appear in the 1997 anthology Monster, and has not been released on CD. Thomas has pronounced the album to have been officially "disappeared", writing "BTW Winter Comes Home does not exist. According to the Authorized View, it never did exist and, so, it never will exist. Those who claim to own copies are troublemakers. Report them to the Grocery Police."

The album was eventually re-released as a download, sourced from a vinyl copy as "the master tapes were lost long ago".

== Track listing ==
1. "A Day Such As This"
2. "Winter Comes Home"
3. "West Side Story"
4. "Sunset"
5. "Stormy Weather"
6. "Poetic License"
7. "Rhapsody in Pink"
8. "Dinosaurs Like Me"
9. "Petrified"
10. "Bones in Action"
11. "Contrasted Views of the Archaeopteryx"

== Personnel ==
- David Thomas – vocals
- Lindsay Cooper – electric bassoon
- Chris Cutler – drums
