= More Places Forever =

Studio album by David Thomas
- Released: May 1985
- Recorded: July – September 1984
- Studio: Suma (Painesville, Ohio)
- Genre: Art rock, avant-prog
- Length: 35:06
- Label: Rough Trade
- Producer: David Thomas

David Thomas chronology
Variations on a Theme (1983)	More Places Forever (1985)	Monster Walks the Winter Lake (1986)

Professional ratings
Review scores
Source	Rating
AllMusic	4/5 stars
Robert Christgau	B+

More Places Forever is the third studio album by experimental singer-songwriter David Thomas, released in May 1985 by Rough Trade Records. In 1997, the album was remastered by Paul Hamann and David Thomas for its inclusion in the Monster anthology box set.

== Reception ==
Spin said, "Thomas bends his fluid, offkilter voice into an instrument, singing duets with oboe, bassoon, and tuba and spacing off into light-hearted little monologues about love and the weather and whether one can bail out the ocean with a bucket and a notion. Though it's easy to dismiss as nursery blatherings, there are actually many subtle, witty references to discover and laugh at."

== Track listing ==
All tracks are written by Lindsay Cooper, Chris Cutler, Tony Maimone and David Thomas, except "About True Friends" co-written with Jack Monck.

Side one
No.	Title	Length
1.	"Through the Magnifying Glass"	2:58
2.	"Enthusiastic"	4:45
3.	"Whale Head King"	5:49
4.	"Song of the Bailing Man"	4:42

Side two
No.	Title	Length
1.	"Big Breezy Day"	3:24
2.	"The Farmer's Wife"	4:31
3.	"New Broom"	4:20
4.	"About True Friends"	4:33

== Personnel ==
Adapted from the More Places Forever liner notes.

Musicians

- Lindsay Cooper – bassoon, oboe, alto saxophone, sopranino saxophone, tuba, piano, organ
- Chris Cutler – drums
- Tony Maimone – bass guitar, piano (B2)
- David Thomas – lead vocals, production

Production and additional personnel

- Paul Hamann – engineering, mixing

== Release history ==
Region	Date	Label	Format	Catalog
United Kingdom	1985	Rough Trade	LP	ROUGH 80
United States	1985	Twin/Tone	LP	TTR 8551
