= Closer to Home =

Studio album by Grand Funk Railroad
- Released: June 15, 1970
- Recorded: March 1970
- Studios: Cleveland Recording Company, Cleveland
- Genre: Hard rock
- Length: 44:27
- Label: Capitol
- Producer: Terry Knight

Grand Funk Railroad chronology
Grand Funk (1969)	Closer to Home (1970)	Live Album (1970)

Singles from Closer to Home
- 1. "Sin's a Good Man's Brother"/"Nothing Is the Same" Released: June 1970; 2. "I'm Your Captain (Closer to Home)"/"Aimless Lady" Released: July 1970

Professional ratings
Review scores
Source	Rating
AllMusic	4/5 stars
Christgau's Record Guide	C+
Rolling Stone	3/5 stars
The Village Voice	B

Closer to Home is the third studio album by American rock band Grand Funk Railroad. The album was released on June 15, 1970, by Capitol Records. Recorded at Cleveland Recording Company, the album was produced by Terry Knight. This album reached RIAA gold record status in 1970, making it the group's third gold record in one year. The album's inside artwork shows a live photo of the band performing at Madison Square Garden in February 1970.

In 2002 Closer to Home was remastered on compact disc with bonus tracks and also released in a limited-edition box set Trunk of Funk that contained the band's first four albums. The "trunk" has slots for twelve CDs to house the future release of the remaining eight albums that were released by Capitol. Also included is a pair of "Shinin' On" 3-D glasses, guitar pick and a sticker reproducing a concert ticket.

== Track listing ==
All songs written by Mark Farner.

Side one
No.	Title	Length
1.	"Sin's a Good Man's Brother"	4:35
2.	"Aimless Lady"	3:25
3.	"Nothing Is the Same"	5:10
4.	"Mean Mistreater"	4:25
5.	"Get It Together"	5:07

Side two
No.	Title	Length
1.	"I Don't Have to Sing the Blues"	4:35
2.	"Hooked on Love"	7:10
3.	"I'm Your Captain (Closer to Home)"	10:09

2002 bonus tracks
No.	Title	Length
9.	"Mean Mistreater (Alternate)"	4:33
10.	"In Need (Live)"	11:30
11.	"Heartbreaker (Live)"	7:17
12.	"Mean Mistreater (Live)"	5:22

== Personnel ==
- Mark Farner – guitar, keyboards, vocals
- Mel Schacher – bass
- Don Brewer – drums, vocals
- Terry Knight – producer

2002 Remaster

- David K. Tedds – reissue production and compilation
- Kevin Flaherty – supervising A&R producer
- Jimmy Hoyson – bonus track mix engineer
- Evren Göknar – mastering engineer
- Kenny Nemes – project manager
- Michelle Azzopardi – reissue creative direction
- Neil Kellerhouse – reissue art direction, design
- Steve Roeser – liner notes
- Brendan Gormley – editorial supervision
- Bryan Kelley – production
- Shannon Ward – production

== Charts ==
Chart (1970)	Peak position
Australian Albums (Kent Music Report)	9
Canada Top Albums/CDs (RPM)	5
Japanese Albums (Oricon)	30
US Billboard 200	6

== Certifications ==
Region	Certification	Certified units/sales
United States (RIAA)	2× Platinum	2,000,000^{^}
^{^} Shipments figures based on certification alone.
