= Grand Funk (album) =

Studio album by Grand Funk Railroad
- Released: December 29, 1969
- Recorded: October 10–21, 1969
- Studios: Cleveland Recording Company, Cleveland
- Genres: Hard rock; blues rock
- Length: 48:25
- Label: Capitol
- Producer: Terry Knight

Grand Funk Railroad chronology
On Time (1969)	Grand Funk (1969)	Closer to Home (1970)

Singles from Grand Funk
- 1. "Mr. Limousine Driver" / "High Falootin' Woman" Released: November 1969; 2. "Heartbreaker" / "Please Don't Worry" Released: February 1970

Professional ratings
Review scores
Source	Rating
AllMusic	4/5 stars
The Rolling Stone Album Guide	2/5 stars
The Village Voice	C

Grand Funk (commonly known as The Red Album) is the second studio album by American rock band Grand Funk Railroad. It was released on December 29, 1969, by Capitol Records, just four months after their debut album On Time. Recorded at Cleveland Recording Company, the album was produced by Terry Knight and engineered by Ken Hamann. The album was certified gold by the RIAA, the first for the group. It includes a cover of the Animals' 1966 song "Inside Looking Out", which is still a staple of the band's live concerts.

Grand Funk was originally released by Capitol Records in LP, cassette, 8-track tape, and reel-to-reel configurations. The original reel-to-reel version (manufactured for Capitol/EMI by Ampex) contains edited versions of "Got This Thing on the Move", "Please Don't Worry", "Mr. Limousine Driver" and "Inside Looking Out", the harmonica solo has been deleted, not available elsewhere. The edits on these songs reduce the album's overall running time by approximately five minutes.

In 2002, Grand Funk was remastered on compact disc with bonus tracks and also released in a limited edition box set Trunk of Funk that contained the band's first four albums. The "trunk" has slots for twelve CDs to house the future release of the remaining eight albums that were released by Capitol Records. Also included is a pair of Shinin' On 3-D glasses, a guitar pick and a sticker reproducing a concert ticket.

== Track listing ==
All songs written and composed by Mark Farner, except where noted.

Side one
No.	Title	Writer(s)	Length
1.	"Got This Thing on the Move"		4:38
2.	"Please Don't Worry"	Don Brewer, Farner	4:19
3.	"High Falootin' Woman"		3:00
4.	"Mr. Limousine Driver"		4:26
5.	"In Need"		7:52

Side two
No.	Title	Writer(s)	Length
6.	"Winter and My Soul"		6:38
7.	"Paranoid"		7:50
8.	"Inside Looking Out"	John Lomax, Alan Lomax, Eric Burdon, Bryan "Chas" Chandler	9:31

Bonus tracks
No.	Title	Length
9.	"Nothing is the Same (Demo)"	5:39
10.	"Mr. Limousine Driver (Remix)"	5:28

== Personnel ==
- Mark Farner – guitars, keyboards, harmonica, lead vocals
- Mel Schacher – bass
- Don Brewer – drums, lead vocals
- Terry Knight – producer

2002 Remaster

- David K. Tedds – produced & compiled for reissue by
- Kevin Flaherty – supervising A&R producer
- Jimmy Hoyson – bonus track mix engineer
- Evren Göknar – mastering engineer
- Kenny Nemes – project manager
- Michelle Azzopardi – reissue creative direction
- Neil Kellerhouse – reissue art direction, design
- Steve Roeser – liner notes
- Brendan Gormley – editorial supervision
- Bryan Kelley – production
- Shannon Ward – production

== Charts ==
Chart (1969-70)	Peak position
Australian Albums (Kent Music Report)	13
Canada Top Albums/CDs (RPM)	9
Japanese Albums (Oricon)	26
US Billboard 200	11

== Certifications ==
Region	Certification	Certified units/sales
United States (RIAA)	Platinum	1,000,000^{^}
^{^} Shipments figures based on certification alone.
