= Meadville (album) =

Live album by David Thomas and Two Pale Boys
- Released: 1997
- Genre: Rock
- Label: Hearpen Music

David Thomas and Two Pale Boys chronology
Erewhon (1996)	Meadville (1997)	Monster (1997)

Meadville is an album of live recordings, sold only on concerts. The Two Pale Boys are Keith Moliné on midi-guitar and Andy Diagram on "trumpet through electronics".

== Track listing ==
All tracks composed by David Thomas; except where indicated

1. "Obsession" (Keith Moliné) – 4:29
2. "Nobody Knows" – 9:38
3. "Red Sky" – 5:37
4. "Can't Help Falling in Love" (George David Weiss, Hugo Peretti, Luigi Creatore) – 3:52
5. "Nowheresville" (Andy Diagram, Keith Moliné) – 6:00
6. "Fire" – 5:35
7. "Kathleen" – 10:26
8. "Surfer Girl / Around The Fire" (Brian Wilson) – 10:31
9. "Beach Boys" – 6:38
10. "Weird Cornfields" (Andy Diagram, Keith Moliné) – 5:52
11. "Busman's Honeymoon" – 5:35

== Personnel ==
David Thomas and Two Pale Boys

- David Thomas
- Keith Moliné
- Andy Diagram
