= New Picnic Time =

Studio album by Pere Ubu
- Released: September 19, 1979
- Recorded: 21 May – 28 June 1979
- Studio: Suma (Painesville, Ohio)
- Genres: Post-punk; experimental rock
- Length: 35:54
- Label: Chrysalis
- Producers: Pere Ubu, Ken Hamann

Pere Ubu chronology
Dub Housing (1978)	New Picnic Time (1979)	The Art of Walking (1980)

Singles from New Picnic Time
- 1. "Have Shoes Will Walk (The Fabulous Sequel)" Released: October 1979

New Picnic Time is the third album by the American rock band Pere Ubu. It was released in September 1979 by Chrysalis Records. The album was reissued in 1989 on CD by Rough Trade Records, in 1999 on CD by Thirsty Ear Records, in 2008 on CD on Cooking Vinyl, and in 2017 on vinyl and CD by Fire Records.

== Background and recording ==
The recording sessions for the album, the working title of which was Goodbye, were stressful and contentious. According to David Thomas, the band "had been intent on stretching the boundaries of the song":

I pushed maybe too hard and not wisely. I was determined. "All the Dogs Are Barking" was the breaking point. It was a pop song in the nature of what we had done before, a rock song with catchy hooks. I told Ken (Hamann, the engineer) to erase everything but the overdubs.

Normal studio problems were overcome by unusual means: for example, on "The Fabulous Sequel", the band wanted to record maracas but the studio only had one of a pair; the microphones were then put out on the gravel drive outside the studio and the band members all walked around in circles to create a maraca sound.

Another point of contention was Thomas's involvement in Jehovah's Witnesses. According to synth player Allen Ravenstine, this, along with disagreements about the band's direction, contributed to guitarist Tom Hermann leaving the band soon after completing the album: "[Thomas] was trying to get his Jehovah's Witness message in there, then he [Hermann] got very upset. So that was the end of him". The affiliation was reflected lyrically in the final song on the album "Jehovah's Kingdom Comes!".

Pere Ubu's then-record label, Chrysalis, was unhappy with the finished product and refused to release it in America. After one U.S. tour in support of the record and Tom Hermann's departure, the band briefly became inactive, before reuniting in 1980 with Mayo Thompson.

The lyrics for the song "The Voice of the Sand" are based upon the poetry of Vachel Lindsay.

== Critical reception ==
Professional ratings
Review scores
Source	Rating
AllMusic	4.5/5 stars
Alternative Press	4/5
Chicago Tribune	3.5/4 stars
Christgau's Record Guide	A−
The Encyclopedia of Popular Music	3/5 stars
Pitchfork	7.9/10
The Rolling Stone Album Guide	3.5/5 stars
Spin Alternative Record Guide	6/10

New Picnic Time has been described as the "black sheep" of the band's catalog as it featured a more experimental sound than any of their previous albums up to that point and originally didn't see release in America, only being toured once. On September 15, 1979, Dave McCullough reviewed the album for Sounds, writing: "It's a drunken, wanton, wilful sounding album with a spine as elastic and as totally absorbing as Beefheart...exhilarating, funny, somehow very vital music."

Writing in Melody Maker on September 8, 1979, John Orme noted, "They don't ask to be loved, but they do invite it. Whichever, they are open to instant embrace or rejection. Their music doesn't float on calm waters: it submerges, spurts, takes rapids, often half-drowns on its back... Having fallen in a big way for the last Ubu album, I approached New Picnic Time with much suspicion... Ubu have developed a wider maturity in scope, feeling and atmosphere, and I can only praise them for it. Don't forget to laugh."

In a retrospective review, Scott Laurence of the Herald-American described the album as "Weird. Weird and wonderful. Weird, wonderful and so far beyond the expected that these deconstructions of popular music are as charmingly retro as the Beatles and as modern as today's blendings of funk, hip-hop and alt-rock. Revolutionary and demented yet full of fun, Pere Ubu are indispensable to any collection of 20th century rock."

New Music USA's Rick Moody remarked, "I have been saying that the Pere Ubu album entitled New Picnic Time, from 1979, is the scariest album ever made..." Additionally, he stated "[...] was the rejoinder to any questions about what exactly Pere Ubu wanted, and the rejoinder was a mammoth stick in the eye. Gone, almost entirely, were the more user-friendly aspects of Dub Housing, and in their place we heard a willful insistence on experiment and double-crossing, but also expressive darkness. Let’s look closer".

The Cambridge Evening News wrote that the album "veers wildly between irritatingly inconsequential noises ... and surprisingly catchy riffs."

== Track listing ==
All tracks are written by Pere Ubu (David Thomas, Tom Hermann, Tony Maimone, Allen Ravenstine and Scott Krauss).

No.	Title	Length
1.	"Have Shoes Will Walk (The Fabulous Sequel)"	3:16
2.	"49 Guitars & One Girl"	2:51
3.	"A Small Dark Cloud"	5:49
4.	"Small Was Fast"	3:39
5.	"All the Dogs Are Barking"	3:03
6.	"One Less Worry"	3:46
7.	"Make Hay"	4:03
8.	"Goodbye"	5:18
9.	"The Voice of the Sand"	1:28
10.	"Jehovah's Kingdom Comes!"	3:17
Total length:		36:30

== Release history ==
On the 1989 Rough Trade CD, the song "Jehovah's Kingdom Comes!" was re-titled "Hand a Face a Feeling" (a phrase from the lyrics). For subsequent reissues the song was remixed, removing all references to Jehovah, and re-re-titled "Kingdom Come". On the 2017 Fire Records reissues (and the 2016 box set Architecture of Language 1979 - 1982) the song was edited, removing approximately twenty-five seconds of music. The title of the opening track "Have Shoes Will Walk (The Fabulous Sequel)" has also varied from release to release.

Year of release	Place of Release	Format	Label
1979	United Kingdom, Europe, Germany	Vinyl LP	Chrysalis
1983	Italy	Vinyl LP	Base Record / Go International
1985	Netherlands	Vinyl LP	Rough Be•Ne•Lux
1989	United Kingdom & United States	CD	Rough Trade
1998	Japan	CD	Bomba
1999	Italy, United States, United Kingdom	Vinyl LP, CD	Get Back / RTI Music / Cooking Vinyl / Thirsty Ear
2000	Italy	Vinyl LP	Get Back
2004	Italy	Vinyl LP	Get Back
2017	Europe	Vinyl LP, CD	Fire
2023	Europe	Digital (MP3)	Fire

== Personnel ==
Pere Ubu

- David Thomas – vocals, organ
- Tom Hermann – guitar, bass guitar, organ
- Tony Maimone – bass guitar, guitar, piano
- Allen Ravenstine – EML synthesizers, saxophone
- Scott Krauss – drums

Technical

- Pere Ubu – production
- Ken Hamann – production, engineering, mixing
- Paul Hamann – engineering
- John Thompson – design
