= Mirror Man (David Thomas album) =

Studio album by David Thomas and the Pale Orchestra
- Released: June 1999
- Genre: Rock
- Label: Thirsty Ear
- Producer: David Thomas

David Thomas and the Pale Orchestra chronology
Monster (1997)	Mirror Man (1999)	Bay City (2009)

Professional ratings
Review scores
Source	Rating
Allmusic	4/5 stars
Q	2/5 stars

Mirror Man is the title of a "rogue opera" conceived and orchestrated by David Thomas, as well as an album recording of the first act of that piece. The piece draws many lyrical and imagistic threads from Thomas' entire recorded legacy, as well as relying to a large degree on improvisation and the personalities of its participants. The cast is typically large and diverse, featuring actors, poets and singers supported by a core musical group (based around Thomas' regular collaborators the Two Pale Boys). Set in an abstract highway landscape among anonymous all-night coffee shops, bus stops, roadside detritus, apocryphal road signs, and flickering streetlights, Mirror Man is (according to Thomas) "about places that don't exist and a collection of stories about the people who live there -- abandoned by the future, forbidden access to the past, and set adrift in a mirage-like Now".

== Theatrical production ==
The work was initially commissioned by The South Bank, London, and premiered at the Queen Elizabeth Hall on April 3, 1998 as part of the four-day festival David Thomas: Disastodrome!. Since that time it has been restaged at various festivals, and briefly toured the UK in 2001. The most recent staging was at a second Disastodrome! Festival in Los Angeles, in February 2003. Act 1 is entitled "Jack and the General", referring respectively to Jack Kerouac, and General Dwight D. Eisenhower, and supposes a poetic correlation of the two men via their relationship to the US Interstate Highway System. Act 2 is "Surf's Up in Bay City". Bay City is "where the journey ends, where the unstoppable Great Westward Urge meets the immovable Pacific Object and loses."

== Album ==
Mirror Man is performed in two acts. The album was recorded primarily live at the debut performance (with some fixes and alternate performances patched in), and comprises the first act ("Jack and the General"). The second act ("Surf's Up in Bay City"), which has undergone significant rewrites as the piece has evolved through different stagings, has not been released, though the lyrical and musical content of the most recent incarnation overlaps significantly with both the David Thomas and Two Pale Boys album Surf's Up!, and the David Thomas and Foreigners album Bay City. Due to the fluid and continuous nature of the performance, the album is tracked in a non-traditional manner. There are eleven track points spread across the fifteen distinct songs performed, each roughly, though not exactly, corresponding to the major transition points within the work.

== Cast (aka The Pale Orchestra) ==
Version 1: (as appears on the album) Disastodrome, Queen Elizabeth Hall April 3, 1998

- David Thomas – singer, melodeon
- Bob Holman – poet
- Linda Thompson – singer
- Robert Kidney – singer
- Jackie Leven – singer
- Daved Hild – singer
- Jane Bom-Bane – singer
- Keith Moliné – guitar
- Andy Diagram – trumpet
- Peter Hammill – guitar, keyboards, harmonium
- Jack Kidney – harp, tenor saxophone
- Chris Cutler – drums

Version 3.5: Disastodrome, UCLA - February 24, 2003

- David Thomas – singer, melodeon
- Bob Holman – poet
- Robert Kidney – singer
- Syd Straw – singer
- Van Dyke Parks – singer
- Frank Black – singer
- George Wendt – actor
- Keith Moliné – guitar, electronics
- Andy Diagram – trumpet, electronics
- Jack Kidney – saxophone, harp
- Georgia Hubley – drums, singer
