= The Sound of the Sand and Other Songs of the Pedestrian =

Studio album by David Thomas & the Pedestrians
- Released: October 30, 1981
- Recorded: May – June 1981
- Studio: Regent's Park (London, UK)
- Genre: Art rock, experimental rock
- Length: 37:53
- Label: Rough Trade
- Producer: Adam Kidron, Peter Walmsley

David Thomas chronology
The Sound of the Sand and Other Songs of the Pedestrian (1981)	Vocal Performances (1981)

Professional ratings
Review scores
Source	Rating
Allmusic	4/5 stars
Robert Christgau	B

The Sound of the Sand and Other Songs of the Pedestrian is the debut studio album by experimental singer-songwriter David Thomas. Originally released on October 30, 1981, by Rough Trade Records, the album was remastered in 1997 by Paul Hamann and David Thomas for its inclusion in the Monster anthology box set.

== Track listing ==
All lyrics are written by David Thomas

Side one
No.	Title	Music	Artist	Length
1.	"The Birds Are a Good Idea"	Moxham, Thomas, Thompson	The Pedestrians	1:58
2.	"Yiki Tiki"	Fier, Thomas, Thompson	The Pedestrians	2:15
3.	"The Crickets in the Flats"	Fier	The Golden Palominos	4:59
4.	"Sound of the Sand"	Moxham, Thomas	The Pedestrians	3:28
5.	"The New Atom Mine"	Fier, Greaves, Thomas, Thompson	The Pedestrians	5:17

Side two
No.	Title	Music	Artist	Length
1.	"Big Dreams"	Moxham, Thomas	The Pedestrians	2:22
2.	"Happy to See You"	Thomas	The Trees	3:33
3.	"Crush This Horn Part 2"	Fier, Thomas	The Golden Palominos	1:49
4.	"Confuse Did"	Fier, Thomas	The Pedestrians	2:34
5.	"Sloop John B"	Traditional arr.	The Eggs	5:10
6.	"Man's Best Friend"	Fier, Thomas, Thompson, Thornton	The Pedestrians	4:28

== Musicians ==
Adapted from The Sound of the Sand and Other Songs of the Pedestrian liner notes.

The Pedestrians (A1, A2, A4, A5, B1, B4, B6)

- Anton Fier – drums and percussion
- John Greaves – bass guitar (A5, B4)
- Philip Moxham – bass guitar
- Allen Ravenstine – synthesizer
- David Thomas – lead vocals
- Richard Thompson – guitar and dulcimer
- Eddie "Tan Tan" Thornton – trumpet
- Mayo Thompson – accordion (B6)

The Golden Palominos (A3, B3)

- Anton Fier – drums and percussion
- John Greaves – bass guitar, piano
- Richard Thompson – guitar and dulcimer
- Eddie "Tan Tan" Thornton – trumpet

The Trees (B2)

- Ralph Carney – saxophone and oboe
- Alan Greenblatt – guitar
- Paul Hamann – bass guitar
- Scott Krauss – drums
- Allen Ravenstine – synthesizer

The Eggs (B5)

- Chris Cutler – drums
- Eddie "Tan Tan" Thornton – trumpet

Production and additional personnel

- Phil Bodger – assistant engineer
- Anne Clarke – assistant producer
- Paul Hamann – engineering
- Sue Johnson – assistant producer
- Adam Kidron – production, engineering, mixing, mastering
- Martyn Lambert – design
- Mik Mellen – photography
- Shirley O'Loughlin – assistant producer
- David Thomas – design
- Geoff Travis – executive producer
- Peter Walmsley – production, design

== Release history ==
Region	Date	Label	Format	Catalog
United Kingdom	1981	Rough Trade	LP	ROUGH 30
United States	1981	Rough Trade	LP	ROUGH US 18
