= Velvet Crest =

American rock band

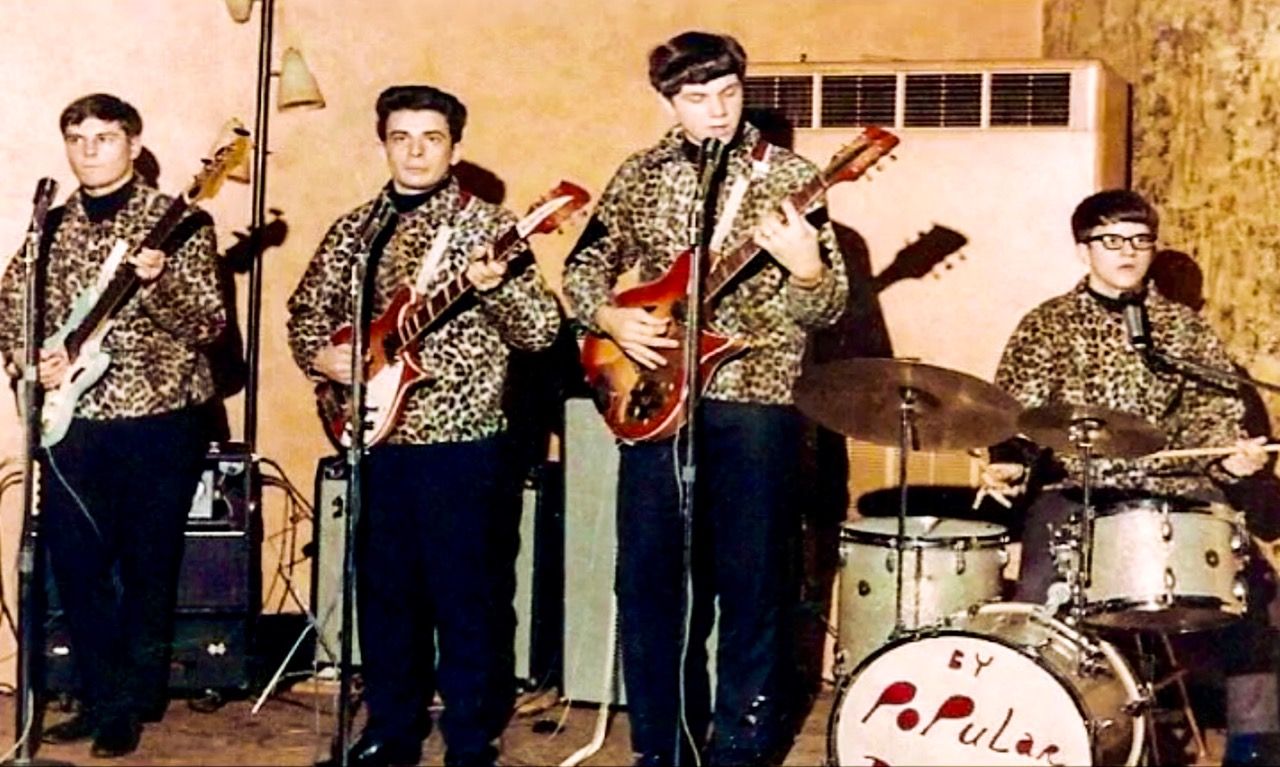
- Velvet Crest, from left, Dave Bartos (vocals/bass), Joel Gordon (vocals/rhythm guitar), Terry St. George (vocals/lead guitar), Jeff Kerekes (vocals/drums), perform at a concert under their original name, By Popular Demand, c. 1968

Background information
- Also known as: By Popular Demand
- Origin: Mineral City, Ohio
- Genres: Rock and roll, Garage rock, Pop rock, Baroque pop
- Years active: 1966-1971
- Labels: Harbour Records, Liberty Records, Bold Records
- Past members: Joel Gordon; Terry St. George; Dave Bartos; Jeff Kerekes; Bob Baird; Bobby Coleman; Eric Oswalt

Velvet Crest was an American rock band from Mineral City, Ohio, best known for their 1969 hit song, “Look Homeward Angel.”

== History ==
=== By Popular Demand (1966–1968) ===
The band originally called themselves “By Popular Demand” and formed in September 1966 in Mineral City, Ohio by 18-year old lead guitarist Terry St. George (aka “Beat”) and 17-year-old bassist Dave Bartos. St. George and Bartos soon approached 28-year-old Mineral City guitarist Joel Gordon and asked him to join as the third member. Gordon bought a Rickenbacker electric guitar and was given a week to learn the band's songs. Drummer Jeff Kerekes was recruited from nearby Magnolia, Ohio, and joined soon after.

The foursome immediately had great musical chemistry and worked on their sound for several weeks in Gordon's auto upholstery workshop at night after the shop closed. They soon began playing local dances, parties, and contests, and were known for their close four-part harmony vocals - an uncommon talent for garage rock bands of the era. Their first big break came on October 29, 1966, only six weeks after forming, when they beat out eight other bands to win the Cuyahoga Falls News Association Battle of the Bands contest. This early victory garnered local press for the band and allowed them to secure future bookings at prominent rock clubs in northeast Ohio. They went on to win several other battle of the bands contests and became very popular in the Canton/Akron/Cleveland area.

Riding the momentum of their live shows, By Popular Demand entered the studio at Cleveland Recording Company in March, 1968 to record an original 7” single, "You Might Need Me," and b-side "I Want To Write A Song About You.” The single was released on Unis Records and received airplay on pop radio stations in the region. The band appeared on several Ohio radio and televisions shows.

=== Velvet Crest (1969–1970) ===
The studio engineer from the Cleveland Recording session was impressed with the group and asked if they ever considered working with a record producer. He introduced them to Carl Maduri, a Cleveland-area record producer with music industry connections. After some negotiations, Maduri agreed to produce the group.

Maduri did not hear any potential hits among the band's original songs, so he asked them instead to record the classic vocal ballad, “Look Homeward Angel,” as their first single. At the time, soft rock bands like The Vogues were popular on the radio, and Maduri hoped to capitalize on this trend. The band preferred to play edgier rock music and were reluctant to record this song, but ultimately agreed after Maduri threatened to shelve the project. Tracking for “Look Homeward Angel” was completed at Cleveland Recording in November 1968, and Maduri arranged for members of the Cleveland Orchestra to add orchestral background strings, giving the song a lush baroque pop sound.

Maduri also changed the band's name to the Velvet Crest, dressed them in matching brown Edwardian velvet suits, and signed them to manager, Nick Boldi, a music industry veteran who had previously worked with Pat Boone. A record deal was secured with Harbour Records in New York, a newly-formed subsidiary of Buddah Records, and “Look Homeward Angel,” with b-side “Song of the Rain," was released on January 27, 1969.

Buddah Records heavily promoted the single and the band received several write-ups in national music magazines. The February 1969 issue of Cash Box Magazine described “Look Homeward Angel” as “Material fit for a Vogues session, a splendid arrangement and choral presentation make this outing a very attractive side for teen and easy listening exposure. Could break with a bit of luck.” A full page advertisement in the same issue announced the formation of Harold Berkman's Harbour label and his “first tidal wave…'Look Homeward Angel' by The Velvet Crest.” Another publication, Record World, listed “Look Homeward Angel” as one of eight tunes for radio programmers to watch. The February 15 issue of Billboard placed “Look Homeward Angel” in the Special Merit Section, describing the song as “a strong debut with a smooth group that fits all types of programing and offers much for commercial sales.”

The band went on the road during the spring of 1969 and played many dates in support of the single. Radio stations from Seattle to New York began playing the record, and within 5 weeks, it sold 50,000 copies. On April 7, 1969, the band joined Tommy James and the Shondells at the sold out KQV Easter Shower of Stars concert in front of 12,800 screaming fans at Pittsburgh Civic Arena. Also on the bill that night were the Classics IV, 1910 Fruitgum Company, New Colony Six, and The Jaggerz. The popularity of “Look Homeward Angel” continued to rise through the spring as the song became a #1 hit on many radio stations, and eventually peaked at #93 on the national charts. An official Velvet Crest Fan Club was started by a group of female teenage fans in Pennsylvania and the band made a special appearance at the home of the club's president.

After the success of “Look Homeward Angel”, the band's contract was sold to Liberty Records in Los Angeles and they were placed under the guidance of Liberty record executive Dick Glasser. The band began writing new music in preparation for a follow-up single, and returned to Cleveland Recording in late-1969 to record “Lookin’ Through The Eyes Of Love” and “Gotta Make You Mine.” The latter was an original song written by Bartos and Kerekes. Both tracks were again produced by Carl Maduri and mixed in Los Angeles. Upon the release of the new single, Liberty flew the band out to Los Angeles for several months to promote the record. The song did well and received good airplay, but ultimately didn't match the success of “Look Homeward Angel.”

Around this time, Gordon, St. George, and Bartos had a falling out with drummer Jeff Kerekes and Kerekes left the band. He was replaced by drummer Ritchie Billanco, from New Philadelphia, Ohio band, The Royal Chessmen. Ken Waggen, a bassist and bandmate of Billanco, also joined the band, allowing Bartos to move to the guitar.

Frustrated with the performance of “Lookin’ Through The Eyes Of Love” and a lack of promotional support from the label, the band had a falling out with Boldi and Glasser and were eventually dropped from the label. Gordon, St. George, and Bartos returned to Mineral City in 1970.

=== ’New’ Velvet Crest (1970–1971) ===
Nick Boldi owned the rights to the name Velvet Crest and decided to continue the band with different members. He brought back original drummer Jeff Kerekes along with new musicians Bob Baird, Bobby Coleman, and Eric Oswalt. Under Boldi's direction, they recorded two singles, the Bubblegum pop-influenced “Na-Na-Song" with b-side “Did You Ever Feel Like Kicking Yourself” and Beatles cover "Things We Said Today" with b-side “Something Tells Me.” Both singles found local success but failed to chart nationally. By 1971, the band had dissolved for good.

=== Later years ===
Upon returning to Ohio, Joel Gordon, Dave Bartos, and Jeff Kerekes played in various other bands through the early-1970s, but none reached the success of The Velvet Crest. Terry St. George was drafted into the Army in 1970 and returned to music after his service had ended. During the seventies, Gordon became a successful leather clothing designer with his company, The Leather Loft, and won two International Leather Designer of the Year awards in New York City. Dave Bartos became a successful chiropractor in Dover, Ohio. Gordon and St. George later played together in bands “American Grease” and “Joe Banana and the Bunch,” the latter included former members of The Music Explosion. Both Gordon and St. George continue to play music today in various bands in the Canton/New Philadelphia/Dover areas. Joel Gordon was the subject of a 2011 independent documentary about his life, titled “Joel Gordon. Made In America.”

== See also ==
- Buddah Records
- Liberty Records
- Cleveland Recording Company
- List of garage rock bands
- Music of Ohio
