= Mineral City, Ohio =

- Village
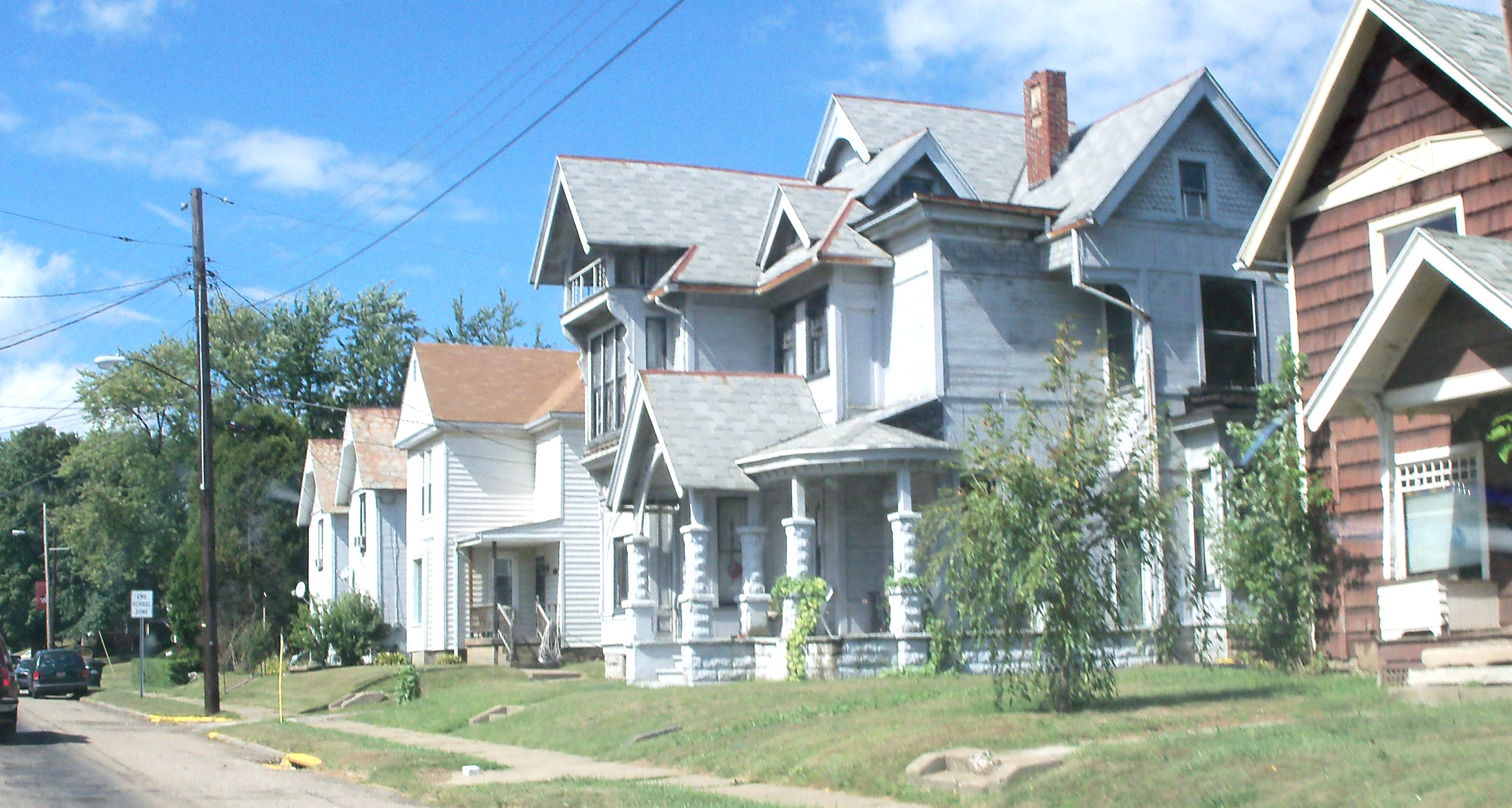
- Victorian homes on Ohio State Route 800

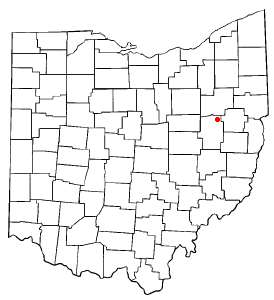
- Location of Mineral City, Ohio

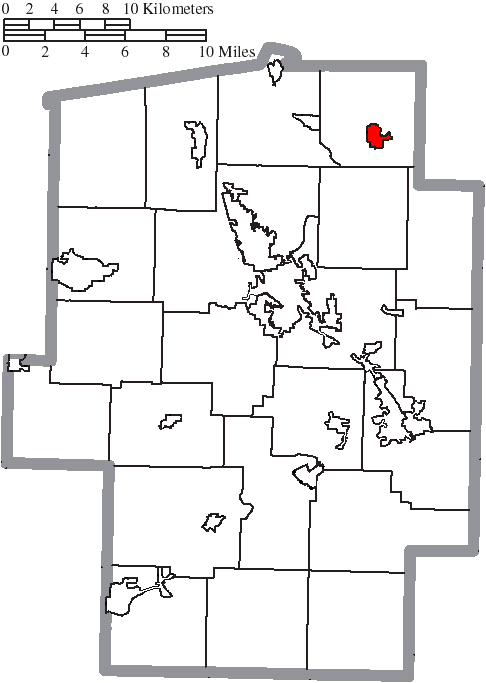
- Location of Mineral City in Tuscarawas County
- Coordinates: 40°36′10″N 81°21′41″W
- Country: United States
- State: Ohio
- County: Tuscarawas
- Township: Sandy

Area
  - Total: 0.70 sq mi (1.82 km^{2})
  - Land: 0.70 sq mi (1.82 km^{2})
  - Water: 0 sq mi (0.00 km^{2})
- Elevation: 951 ft (290 m)

Population (2020)
  - Total: 652
  - Density: 928/sq mi (358.2/km^{2})
- Time zone: UTC-5 (Eastern (EST))
  - Summer (DST): UTC-4 (EDT)
- ZIP code: 44656
- Area code: 330
- FIPS code: 39-50764
- GNIS feature ID: 2399371
- Website: https://www.mineralcityoh.org/

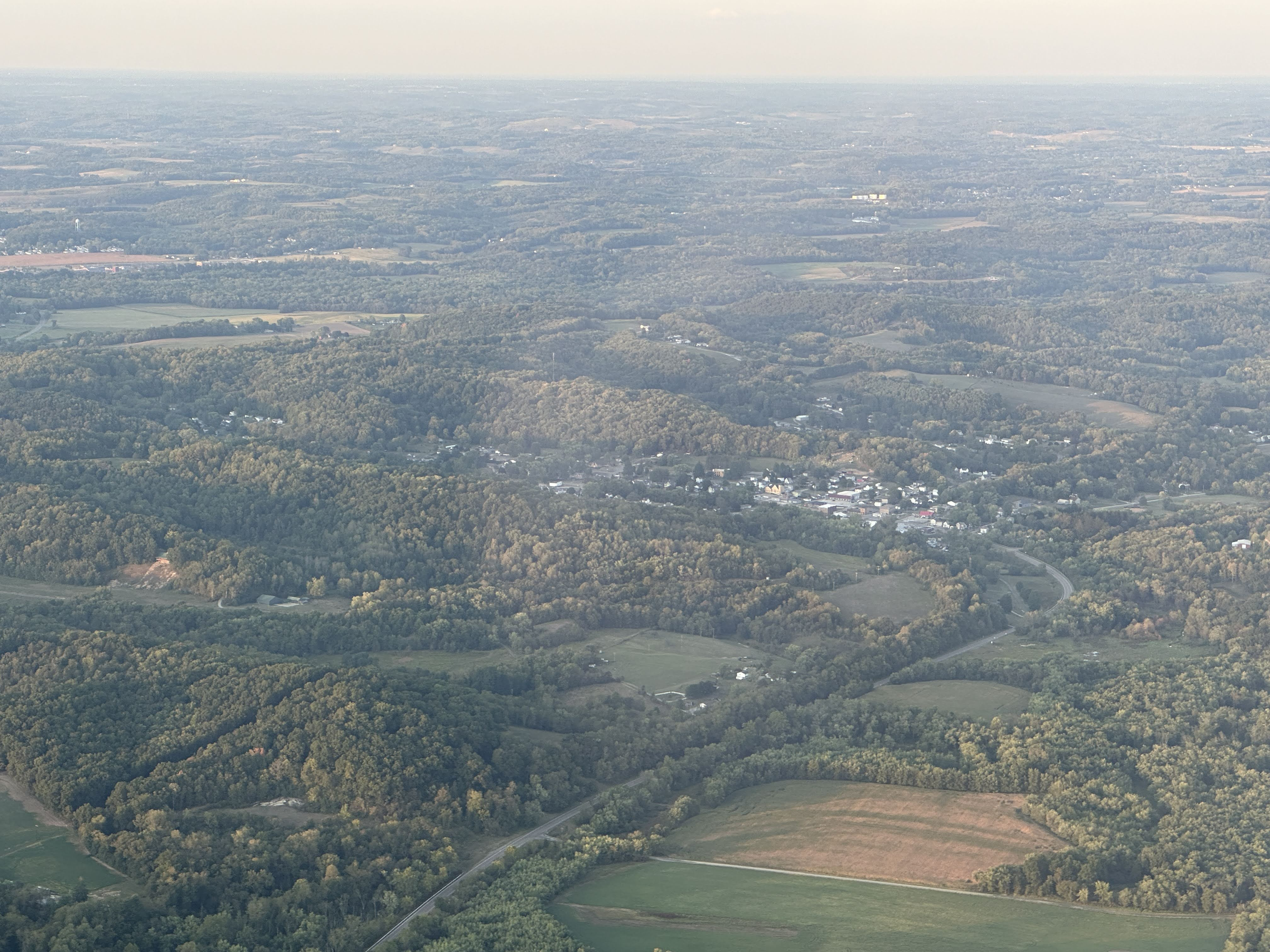
Mineral City viewed from an aerial perspective

Mineral City is a village in Tuscarawas County, Ohio, United States. The population was 652 at the 2020 census.

== Geography ==
According to the United States Census Bureau, the village has a total area of 0.82 square miles (2.12 km^{2}), all land.

== History ==
Mineral City was platted in 1853. The village was named for mineral deposits near the original town site.

== Demographics ==
Historical population
Census	Pop.	Note	%±
1870	175		—
1880	642		266.9%
1890	893		39.1%
1900	1,220		36.6%
1910	1,032		−15.4%
1920	800		−22.5%
1930	840		5.0%
1940	820		−2.4%
1950	831		1.3%
1960	917		10.3%
1970	860		−6.2%
1980	884		2.8%
1990	725		−18.0%
2000	841		16.0%
2010	727		−13.6%
2020	652		−10.3%

=== 2010 census ===
As of the census of 2010, there were 727 people, 278 households, and 194 families living in the village. The population density was 886.6 inhabitants per square mile (342.3/km^{2}). There were 322 housing units at an average density of 392.7 per square mile (151.6/km^{2}). The racial makeup of the village was 95.5% White, 1.8% African American, 0.1% Native American, 1.0% Asian, 0.1% Pacific Islander, and 1.5% from two or more races. Hispanic or Latino of any race were 0.7% of the population.

There were 278 households, of which 39.2% had children under the age of 18 living with them, 48.2% were married couples living together, 15.8% had a female householder with no husband present, 5.8% had a male householder with no wife present, and 30.2% were non-families. 23.7% of all households were made up of individuals, and 9.7% had someone living alone who was 65 years of age or older. The average household size was 2.62 and the average family size was 3.05.

The median age in the village was 36.3 years. 27.2% of residents were under the age of 18; 9.6% were between the ages of 18 and 24; 27.1% were from 25 to 44; 27.2% were from 45 to 64; and 8.9% were 65 years of age or older. The gender makeup of the village was 48.0% male and 52.0% female.

=== 2000 census ===
As of the census of 2000, there were 841 people, 306 households, and 235 families living in the village. The population density was 1,036.6 inhabitants per square mile (400.2/km^{2}). There were 331 housing units at an average density of 408.0 per square mile (157.5/km^{2}). The racial makeup of the village was 98.22% White, 0.24% Native American, 0.48% from other races, and 1.07% from two or more races. Hispanic or Latino of any race were 1.43% of the population.

There were 306 households, out of which 37.9% had children under the age of 18 living with them, 58.2% were married couples living together, 14.7% had a female householder with no husband present, and 23.2% were non-families. 18.3% of all households were made up of individuals, and 7.2% had someone living alone who was 65 years of age or older. The average household size was 2.75 and the average family size was 3.12.

In the village, the population was spread out, with 30.0% under the age of 18, 8.0% from 18 to 24, 30.8% from 25 to 44, 22.1% from 45 to 64, and 9.2% who were 65 years of age or older. The median age was 34 years. For every 100 females there were 102.2 males. For every 100 females age 18 and over, there were 96.3 males.

The median income for a household in the village was $35,526, and the median income for a family was $38,375. Males had a median income of $28,958 versus $20,357 for females. The per capita income for the village was $13,498. About 7.6% of families and 8.9% of the population were below the poverty line, including 7.9% of those under age 18 and 10.0% of those age 65 or over.

== Notable residents ==
- James Seccombe, former mayor of Canton, Ohio and United States Representative, born in Mineral City in 1893.
- Velvet Crest, rock band formed in Mineral City in 1966
