= Bay City (album) =

Studio album by David Thomas and Foreigners
- Released: 2000
- Studios: Ninth World Studios, Helsingør, Denmark; Hearpen Studios
- Genre: Rock
- Label: Thirsty Ear
- Producer: David Thomas

David Thomas and Foreigners chronology
Mirror Man (1999)	Bay City (2000)	Surf's Up! (2001)

Professional ratings
Review scores
Source	Rating
AllMusic	3/5 stars
The Encyclopedia of Popular Music	3/5 stars

Bay City is an album by David Thomas and Foreigners, released in 2000.

== Production ==
The album was recorded in Denmark, over a period of three years. Its title is an homage to the Bay City of Raymond Chandler's writings.

== Critical reception ==
CMJ New Music Monthly wrote that Thomas "has to be one of the most soulful abstractionists going, and these three Danish improvisers are as simpatico as any band he's been with."

== Track listing ==
All tracks composed by David Thomas, Peter Ole Jørgensen, Per Buhl Acs and Jørgen Teller

1. "Clouds of You" – 4:24
2. "White Room" – 3:37
3. "Black Coffee Dawn" – 4:35
4. "Salt" – 5:58
5. "Nobody Lives On The Moon" – 2:06
6. "Charlotte" – 3:52
7. "The Doorbell" – 2:51
8. "15 Seconds" – 5:19
9. "The Radio Talks To Me" – 3:57
10. "Shaky Hands" – 4:56
11. "Black Rain" – 5:47
12. "Turpentine" – 2:34
13. "White Room #4" – 3:36

== Personnel ==
David Thomas and Foreigners

- David Thomas - vocals
- Jørgen Teller - guitar, Casio synthesizer
- Per Buhl Acs - bass, clarinet, melodica
- Peter Ole Jørgensen - drums, percussion, steel drums, vibraphone
