= Yellow Arch Studios =

Recording studio in Sheffield, England

Coordinates: 53.3920°N 1.4747°W

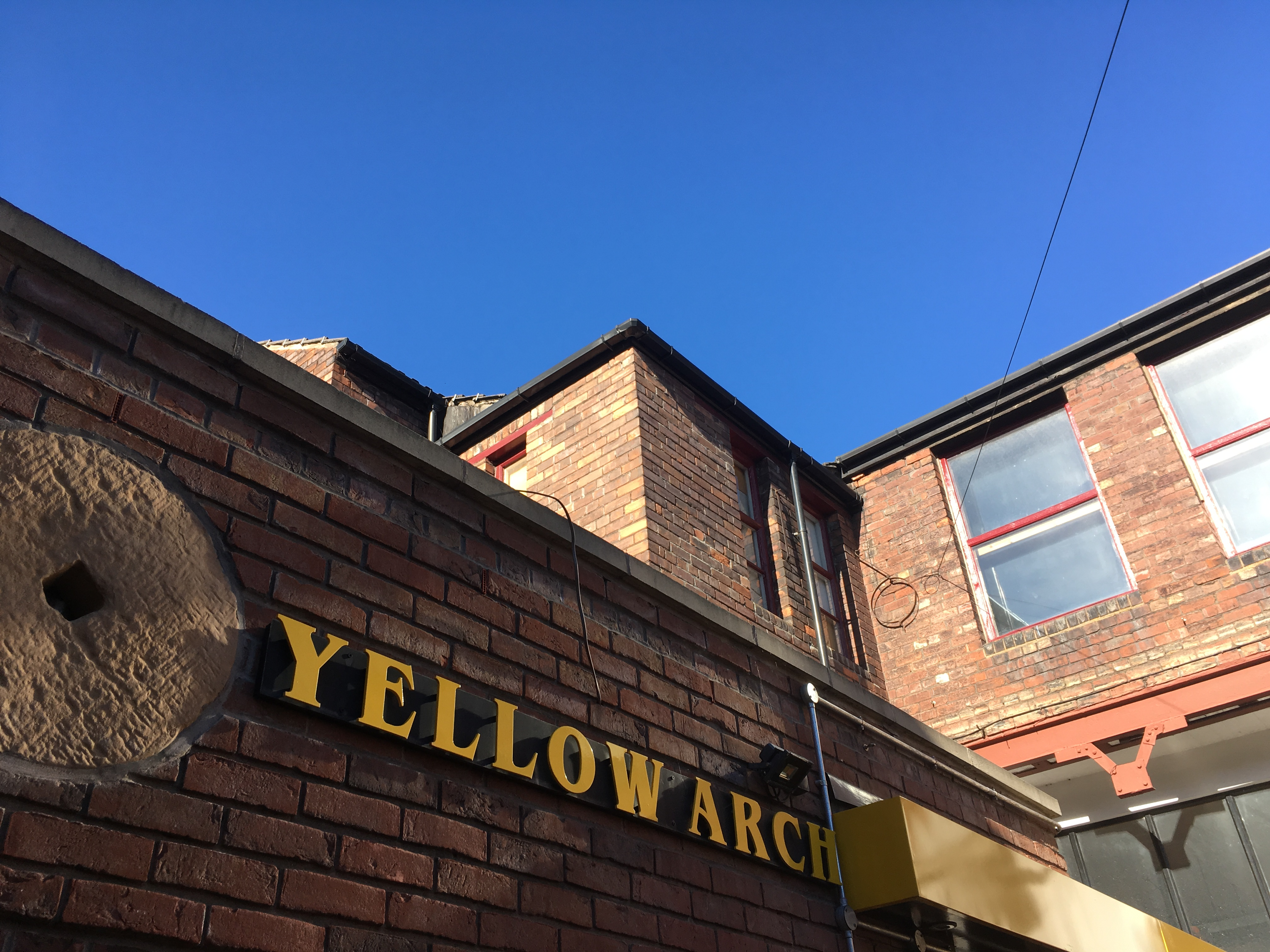
- Interactive map of Yellow Arch Studios
- Capacity: 200
- Public transit: B Y Shalesmoor

Construction
- Opened: 1997 (recording studio); 2015 (concert venue)

Website
- yellowarch.com

Yellow Arch Studios is a recording studio in situated in the heart of Kelham Island and Neepsend, Sheffield. “Internally, the building includes a state-of-the art recording studio and rehearsal rooms”, the building also has a 200 capacity venue, a large warehouse, courtyard and Moroccan style Café Bar.

Yellow Arch Studios featured as an official venue for the Tramlines Festival until the festival was moved out of the city centre to Hillsborough Park in 2018. It is also the official exam centre for Practical and Jazz Theory examinations for ABRSM in South Yorkshire.

== History ==
Kelham Island and Neepsend were two of the most important industrial areas in Sheffield in the turn of the 20th century, contributing to the world-renowned reputation of the Sheffield steel industry. 30-36 Burton Road started life as an Edwardian Nuts & Bolts factory for the bridge and shipping industry when the steel industry was at its peak. The building was rediscovered in 1996 in disarray and ruin and the Yellow Arch team designed and refurbished the building, “the same team still head up the board today and are active daily in the running, working and facilitating of the business.”

Yellow Arch Studios was the brainchild of Andrew Cook and Colin Elliot for the initial purpose of a place to play and make music. Since then it has established itself “as a hub of the Sheffield music scene” welcoming the likes of Goldfrapp, Kylie Minogue, Jarvis Cocker, Duane Eddy, James, My Darling Clementine, Tony Christie and Richard Hawley to record there.

In February 2015, Yellow Arch Studios opened its doors as a venue; since then it has hosted a diverse range of musicians, DJs and artists including, Macka B, Blossoms, Don Letts, Mungo's Hi-Fi, Slow Club, David Rodigan, Dele Sosimi Afrobeat Orchestra, The Electric Swing Circus, The Dead South and Channel One Soundsystem. The multi-room venue can be transformed to host anything from private parties and weddings to raves and gigs. The large amount of facilities on offer makes Yellow Arch “one of the only buildings in Europe where people can write, rehearse, record, perform and film… under the same roof”.

== Awards ==
In September 2018, Yellow Arch Studios was voted "Sheffield’s Best Late Night Venue" in the Social Sheffield Awards.

Yellow Arch Studios has been praised by locals as being a catalyst for the regeneration of the Kelham Island and Neepsend area, which had previously been known as a derelict red-light-district, as represented in the Arctic Monkeys' song When the Sun Goes Down. Kelham Island is now a finalist for the Academy of Urbanism Urbanism Award 2019 for “Great Neighbourhood” in the UK, alongside Hackney Wick, London and Ancoats, Manchester.
