= Surf's Up! (album) =

Studio album by David Thomas and Two Pale Boys
- Released: 2001
- Studio: Suma (Painesville, Ohio)
- Genre: Rock
- Length: 51:24
- Label: Thirsty Ear
- Producer: David Thomas

David Thomas and Two Pale Boys chronology
Bay City (2000)	Surf's Up! (2001)	18 Monkeys on a Dead Man's Chest (2004)

Pere Ubu chronology
Pennsylvania (1998)	Surf's Up! (2002)	St. Arkansas (2002)

Professional ratings
Review scores
Source	Rating
AllMusic	4/5 stars
Robert Christgau	(dud)
The Guardian	4/5 stars

Surf's Up! is the second album by David Thomas and Two Pale Boys, released in 2001. The album is named after the Beach Boys' track, which the band covers.

== Critical reception ==
The Chicago Reader wrote that "the Two Pale Boys render Thomas's desolate vision in vivid colors." CMJ New Music Monthly wrote that "there are enough inspired bits to make one endure the few dead spots." The Cleveland Scene wrote that the album "combines elements of the Residents' brilliantly nonsensical instrumentals, Tom Waits's terrifying but exquisite lyrics, and John Zorn's precise, free-jazz workouts." The Inlander called the album one of 2001's best, writing that "there are no musical similarities between Thomas and the Beach Boys, but their lyrical focus on Americana tally here, though this Surf's Up is a beautiful but haunted America." The Quietus wrote that the band "serve up a smattering of avant-folk, coloured by touches of electronic pulses and Rain Dogs era Tom Waits contortions."

== Track listing ==
All tracks composed by David Thomas, Andy Diagram and Keith Moliné; except where indicated

1. "Runaway" – 4:17
2. "Man in the Dark" – 6:26
3. "Night Driving" – 4:58
4. "Surf's Up" (Brian Wilson, Van Dyke Parks) – 8:24
5. "River" – 9:17
6. "Ghosts" – 5:56
7. "Spider in My Stew" – 5:42
8. "Come Home / Green River" – 6:19

== Personnel ==
David Thomas and Two Pale Boys

- David Thomas - vocals, melodeon
- Keith Moliné - midi guitar, bass, sampler
- Andy Diagram - trumpet

Technical

- Paul Hamann - engineer
- John Thompson - artwork
