= Vocal Performances =

Single by David Thomas
- Released: 1981
- Genre: Rock, a cappella
- Label: Rough Trade
- Producer: David Thomas

Vocal Performances was a 12" single released by Pere Ubu frontman David Thomas in 1981. The single was released on Rough Trade Records as Trade 5/12. As per its title, Vocal Performances features two (mostly) cappella recordings from Thomas.

The first track, "Petrified", argues that evolutionary thinking and Latin nomenclature have poorly captured dinosaurs' charm and dignity, such as the Haplocanthosaur, Pterosaur and Archaeopteryx. The second track is "Sloop John B", a cover of the traditional song made famous on Pet Sounds by the Beach Boys. Thomas has argued elsewhere that Pet Sounds is the greatest music album ever recorded.

"Petrified" was recorded at Bushflow Studio in Akron, Ohio, and features a clarinet solo by Ralph Carney. An ensemble version of the track appears on the Pere Ubu album Song of the Bailing Man. "Sloop John B" was recorded on a portable cassette recorder at the Hotel Slavia in London. A copy of this performance was later overdubbed with drums and trumpet and released on Thomas's first solo album, The Sound of the Sand and Other Songs by the Pedestrians.

== Track listing ==
1. "Petrified" (Pere Ubu, lyrics by David Thomas)
2. "Sloop John B" (Traditional; arranged by David Thomas)
