= Doll by Doll =

British rock band

- Origin: London, England
- Genres: Rock, Pop
- Years active: 1977–1983

Doll by Doll were a British rock band based in London. The band was formed by Jackie Leven in 1977. They came to prominence during the new wave period but were largely ignored by the music press of the time – their emotional, psychedelic-tinged music was judged out of step with other bands of the time.

The band took their name from a line in the poem “the first of all my dreams” by E. E. Cummings.

== Career ==
The original line-up was Jackie Leven – vocals and guitar, Jo Shaw – vocals and guitar, Robin Spreafico – vocals and bass, and David McIntosh – vocals and percussion. This lineup only recorded one studio album Remember (produced by Bill Price) before Spreafico was replaced by Tony Waite (1958–2003). In this configuration they released the albums Gypsy Blood (produced by John Sinclair) and the eponymous third album, Doll by Doll (produced by Tom Newman). After touring the album Leven sacked McIntosh and Waite. They were replaced by Andy Anderson (drums) and John Reid (bass).

At the time of final LP Grand Passion, only Leven was left of the original line-up, joined by Helen Turner (vocals and keyboards) and Tom Norden (vocals, guitar and bass) with a number of guest musicians, including David Gilmour of Pink Floyd and Mel Collins. Mark Fletcher (bass) and Chris Clarke (drums) played with the group live. Doll by Doll went into the studio to record a fifth album, to be titled The Last Flick of the Golden Wrench, but the record was never released.

In early 1983 Leven announced that the band - with Helen Turner replaced by Carol Pearett (vocals) and Gary Thompson (keyboards) - would be known by his name alone, and his debut solo record was released in September of that year. In the 1990s Leven went on to become a prolific solo artist, releasing a series of albums featuring more folk oriented material.

In 1988 Leven, Shaw and McIntosh plus ex-Sex Pistol Glen Matlock released a single "Big Tears" under the band name Concrete Bulletproof Invisible. The record was a Melody Maker single of the week.

In 1997 Leven, Shaw, McIntosh and Waite reformed Doll by Doll for a few live performances. Their final appearance was as the support act for Pere Ubu at the Queen Elizabeth Hall, London in 1998.

In 2005, a live recording of the original band was released. Revenge of Memory, which features all but one of the songs on the Remember album, was recorded at the Sheffield Limits Club in 1977.

The four Doll by Doll studio albums were all released for the first time on CD in March 2007 on WEA/Rhino.

== Discography ==
- Remember (Automatic, 1979)
- Gypsy Blood (Automatic, 1979)
- Doll by Doll (Magnet, 1981)
- Grand Passion (Magnet, 1982)
- Revenge of Memory (Live at The Sheffield Limits Club 1977) (Haunted Valley, 2005)
