= Erewhon (album) =

Studio album by David Thomas and Two Pale Boys
- Released: February 1996
- Recorded: Chez Rolo
- Genre: Rock
- Label: Tim/Kerr
- Producer: David Thomas

David Thomas and Two Pale Boys chronology
Erewhon (1996)	Surf's Up! (2001)

Professional ratings
Review scores
Source	Rating
AllMusic	2.5/5 stars

Erewhon is David Thomas and Two Pale Boys' debut album, as well as Thomas' first record outside the Pere Ubu banner since that group's reformation in 1987. The Two Pale Boys are a duo consisting of Keith Moliné on guitar and Andy Diagram on trumpet and other instruments.

== Critical reception ==
The Chicago Reader wrote that the trio "create a sparser and more spontaneous format that allows Thomas to do his thing; their improvised accompaniment encompasses elements of techno, garage rock, and sea chanteys." The Los Angeles Times deemed the album "a veritable cacophony" and "heartily irritating." The Santa Fe New Mexican concluded that it "sounds pretty much like vintage Ubu without a rhythm section."

== Track listing ==
All tracks composed by David Thomas, Keith Moliné and Andy Diagram; except where indicated

1. "Obsession" (David Thomas, Keith Moliné) – 4:33
2. "Planet of Fools" (David Thomas, Keith Moliné) – 2:58
3. "Nowheresville" – 3:47
4. "Fire" (Pere Ubu) – 6:01
5. "Lantern" – 3:21
6. "Morbid Sky" – 5:44
7. "Weird Cornfields" – 3:52
8. "Kathleen" (Pere Ubu) – 8:30
9. "Highway 61 Revisited" (David Thomas, Keith Moliné) – 11:15

== Personnel ==
David Thomas and Two Pale Boys

- David Thomas
- Keith Moliné
- Andy Diagram
