= David Thomas (musician) =

American singer, songwriter and musician (1953–2025)

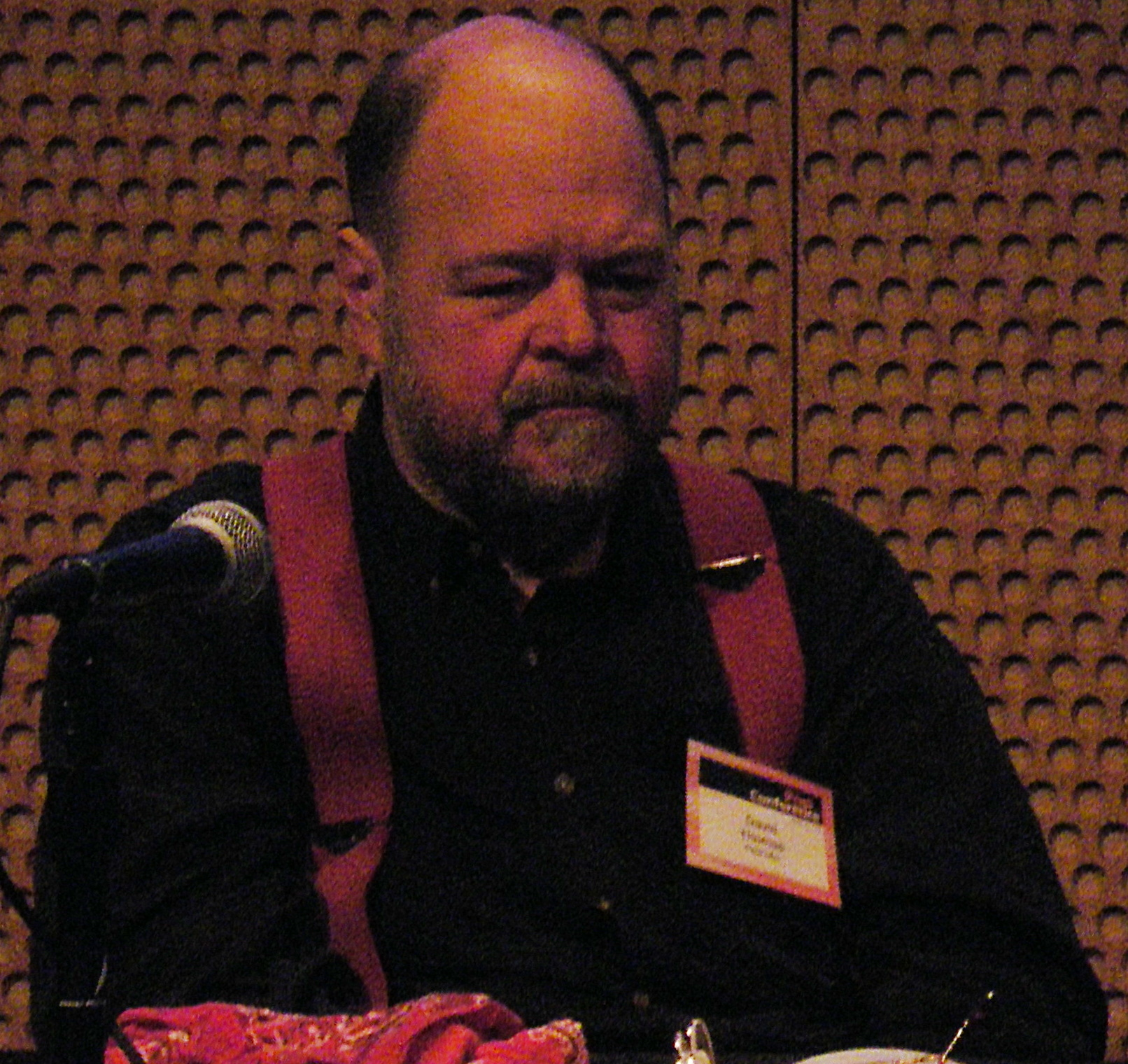
- Thomas in 2009

Background information
- Also known as: Crocus Behemoth
- Born: David Lynn Thomas; June 14, 1953; Miami, Florida, U.S.
- Died: April 23, 2025 (aged 71) Brighton and Hove, East Sussex, England
- Genres: Proto-punk; post-punk; art punk; garage rock; experimental rock; avant-garde
- Occupation: Singer-songwriter; musician
- Instrument: Vocals
- Years active: 1974–2025
- Formerly of: Rocket from the Tombs; Pere Ubu; David Thomas and the Pedestrians; David Thomas and Two Pale Boys; Unknown Instructors
- Website: crocusbehemoth.com

David Lynn Thomas (June 14, 1953 – April 23, 2025) was an American singer, songwriter and poet based in the United Kingdom. He was one of the founding members of the American rock group Pere Ubu from 1975 to 1982, then 1987 through to his death in 2025. Earlier, he co-founded the proto-punk band Rocket from the Tombs, which lasted from 1974 to 1975. He also released several solo albums and collaborative projects. Most notable were the groups David Thomas and the Pedestrians as well as David Thomas and Two Pale Boys.

Though primarily a singer, he was an instrumentalist who also occasionally played melodeon, trombone, musette, guitar or other instruments.

Thomas had a distinctive, high-pitched voice; Emerson Dameron described Thomas' singing as "James Stewart trapped in an oboe". Greil Marcus wrote, "Mr Thomas's voice is that of a man muttering in a crowd. You think he's talking to himself until you realize he's talking to you."

== Early life ==
Thomas was born in Miami, Florida, on June 14, 1953, the oldest of three children. His father's parents were Welsh and French. He taught American literature. His mother was an illustrator at the Natural History Museum. He grew up in Cleveland Heights, an eastern suburb of Cleveland, Ohio.

== Career ==
=== Pere Ubu ===
Thomas was a copy editor and writer / columnist for a weekly tabloid called The Scene, before he co-founded the band Rocket from the Tombs. He played in the band under the name "Crocus Behemoth"; it disbanded after about a year. Along with Rocket from the Tombs soundman Tim Wright and guitarist Peter Laughner, he formed Pere Ubu, which was originally active from 1975 to 1982. Afterwards, Thomas worked with a variety of musicians including guitarists Richard Thompson and Philip Moxham, and Henry Cow bassoonist/oboist Lindsay Cooper, drummer Chris Cutler and bassist John Greaves. Initially, his solo recordings eschewed Pere Ubu's "rock" focus. Cooper's bassoon was often prominent, and, when Thompson's guitar was not featured, the guitar would be absent (such as the entirety of 1985's More Places Forever). Thomas's lyrics became increasingly whimsical, and birds became a common theme:

Somewhere along the line, I wrote a song that had birds in it. And then by pure coincidence, another. Some critic asked, "Why all these songs about birds?" And I said to myself, "You think that's a lot of songs about birds?!? I'll show you a lot of songs about birds!" So, for a while, I stuck birds in everywhere I could.

Eventually, several former members of Pere Ubu gravitated into Thomas's group, and by the time of 1987's Blame the Messenger, were sporting a sound distinctly similar to the former band. This fact along with other considerations led directly into the official reformation of Pere Ubu in 1987, and remained active until Thomas' death.

Thomas was briefly a Jehovah's Witness in the late 1970s, an affiliation that was reflected lyrically in the final song of Pere Ubu's 1979 album New Picnic Time, originally titled "Jehovah's Kingdom Come!" In subsequent releases of the album, the song was renamed "Hand A Face A Feeling" and then "Kingdom Come"; in the album's lyric sheet, maintained by Thomas on Pere Ubu's official website, the titular line was changed to "God's Kingdom Come"; the song was also edited for their compilation Architecture of Language 1979-1982.

=== Solo career ===
Thomas's solo activities were diminished, though not extinguished, by the reformation of Pere Ubu. Throughout the 1980s, Thomas maintained a rotating trio dubbed the Accordion Club, which at various times included John Kirkpatrick, Chris Cutler, Garo Yellin, and Ira Kaplan. While these groupings tended to share a repertoire with Pere Ubu, the focus was smaller. Thomas stated: "I often use the same songs in both projects ... I can explore the stories behind the songs. I can extend/expand/interpolate those stories." Though the Accordion Club never recorded any albums, two songs appeared on Rē Records Quarterly Vol.2 No.1, and it led to the formation of Thomas's next "solo" project, the Two Pale Boys. Devoted to "spontaneous song generation", they feature Keith Moliné on guitar and Andy Diagram on "trumpet through electronics." Both make frequent use of MIDI, giving them a broader tonal palette than might be expected from two instruments. In addition to singing, Thomas frequently played melodeon. Said Thomas:

Pere Ubu is a big rock experience, often overwhelming in its power and intensity of dataflow. It's a Hollywood blockbuster on a CinemaScope screen. Projects like the Two Pale Boys are intended as indie arthouse films.

Thomas typically had a large number of ongoing projects at any one time. He performed in theatrical productions, including several productions by Hal Willner, and a London West End production of Shockheaded Peter. He delivered his lecture "The Geography of Sound in the Magnetic Age" at Clark University and UCLA. He staged his "improvisational opera" Mirror Man at venues in Europe and North America, featuring at various times contributions from many of his previous collaborators, as well as Linda Thompson, Bob Holman, Robert Kidney, Van Dyke Parks, Frank Black, George Wendt, and Syd Straw. In 2010, he performed with the backing of Australian band The Holy Soul.

In the 2020s he alternated recording and performances primarily between iterations of Pere Ubu, David Thomas and Two Pale Boys, and the reunited Rocket from the Tombs.

== Discography ==
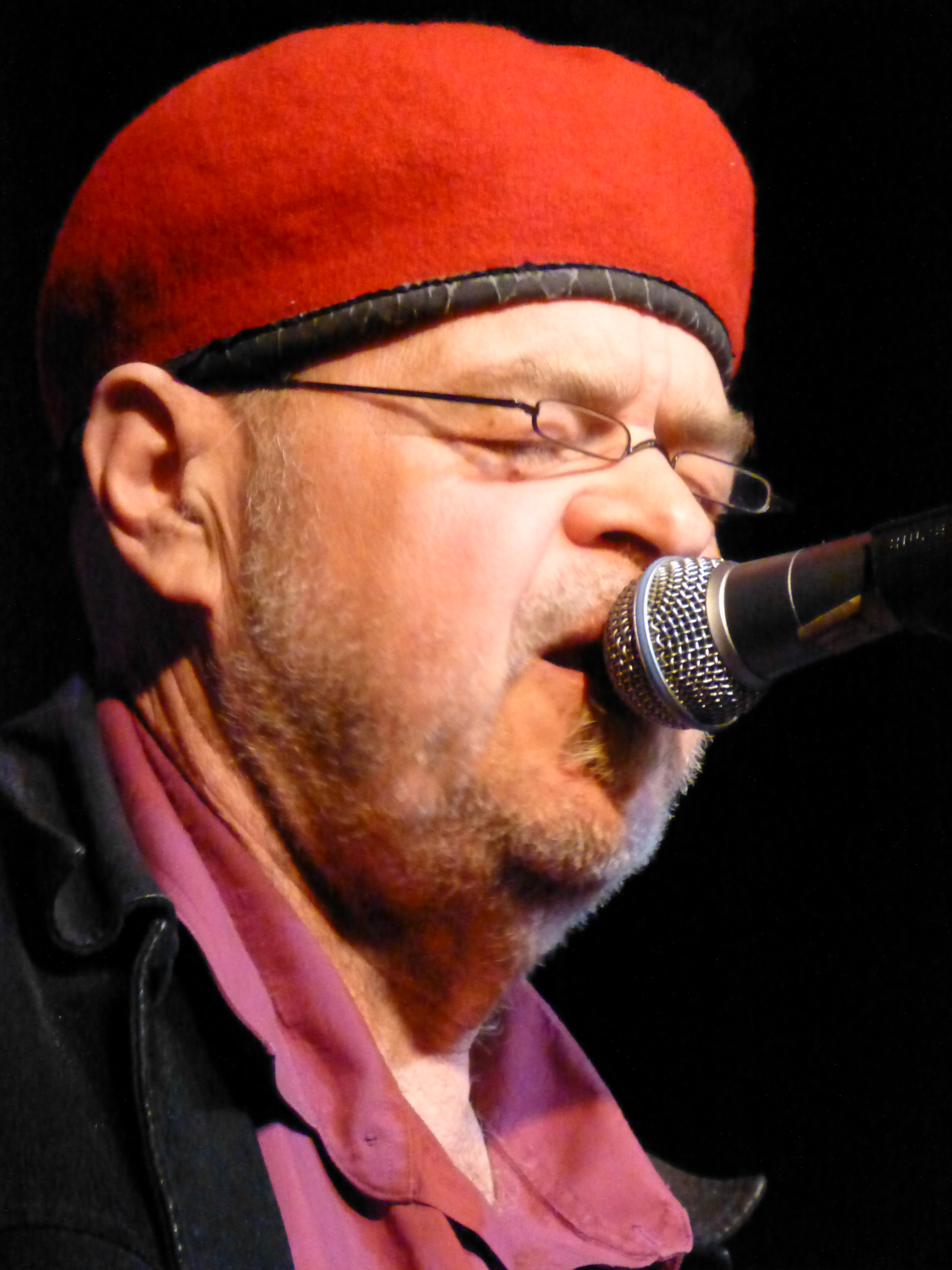
Thomas on stage at Band On The Wall, Manchester, April 18, 2013

=== Albums ===
==== David Thomas & the Pedestrians ====
- The Sound of the Sand & Other Songs of the Pedestrian (1981)
- Variations on a Theme (1983)
- More Places Forever (1985)

==== David Thomas & His Legs ====
- Winter Comes Home (1982) (live -disavowed by Thomas in Monster liner notes)

==== David Thomas & the Wooden Birds ====
- Monster Walks the Winter Lake (1986)
- Blame the Messenger (1987)

==== David Thomas & Foreigners ====
- Bay City (2000)

==== David Thomas & Two Pale Boys ====
- Erewhon (1996)
- Meadville (1997)
- Mirror Man (1999) (as part of The Pale Orchestra)
- Surf's Up!! (2001)
- 18 Monkeys on a Dead Man's Chest (2004)

==== With Unknown Instructors ====
- The Master's Voice (2007)

==== David Thomas and P.O. Jørgens ====
- Live Free or Diet (CD, LP 2017)

=== EPs ===
- Vocal Performances (1981)

=== Compilations ===
- Monster (1997)

=== Contributions ===
- "Dan Dan" & "Drunken Sailor" on Hal Willner's Rogue's Gallery: Pirate Ballads, Sea Songs, and Chanteys (2006)
- "The Pigeons, Mr. McKenzie" on the Hat Shoes' Differently Desperate (LP/CD 1992)
- "You've Lost That Lovin' Feelin'" and "Paris Blues" on Jackie Leven's Defending Ancient Springs (CD 2000)
- "My Spanish Dad" and "Rainy Day Bergen Woman" on Jackie Leven's Creatures Of Light & Darkness (CD 2001)
- "Live (The Meeting Of Remarkable Men)" Jackie Leven with Ian Rankin (DVD 2004)
- "Red Apple Boy" on The Book of Knots' Train Eater (CD, 2007)

== Books ==
- "Pere Ubu, The Scrapbook 1975-1982" (Paperback 158 pages)
- "The Rose and the Briar: Death, Love, and Liberty in the American Ballad" (Contribution 2004)
- "The Book of Hieroglyphs" (Hardback with dust jacket 268 pages 2012)
- "Chinese Whispers, The Making of Lady From Shanghai" (Paperback 100 pages 2013)
- "Cogs, The Making Of Carnival Of Souls" (Paperback 100 pages)
- "Baptized Into The Buzz" (Paperback 124 pages 2019)

== Personal life ==
He married Lynne Ferguson in 1980 and divorced her in 2007. In 2023 he married Kiersty Boon, his partner of 16 years. Thomas died on April 23, 2025, at the age of 71 at a hospital in the English city of Brighton and Hove from complications of kidney disease. The last Pere Ubu album and an autobiography will be published posthumously.
