= Man in the Mirror (disambiguation) =

"Man in the Mirror" is a song by Michael Jackson.

Man in the Mirror may also refer to:

- "Man in the Mirror" (The Avengers), an episode of the TV series The Avengers
- Man in the Mirror: The Michael Jackson Story, a biographical telefilm about Michael Jackson
- The Man in the Mirror (1917 film), a German silent drama film
- The Man in the Mirror (1936 film), a British comedy film
- Man in the Mirror (2008 film), a film made between 1970 and 1972, released in 2008, starring Martin Sheen and Michael Dunn
- Man in the Mirror, a Graham Nash song off of the album Songs for Beginners
- Man in the Mirror, a MIKE song off of the album Showbiz!
- The Man in the Mirror, a Scooby-Doo! Mystery Incorporated episode

== See also ==
- The Guy in the Glass, also called The Man in the Glass, 1934 poem by Dale Wimbrow
