= The Ordinaires =

Experimental rock band

- Origin: New York City, New York, U.S.
- Genres: Post-punk, noise rock, experimental, alternative rock, no wave
- Years active: 1982—1991
- Label: Bar/None Records
- Past members: Angela Babin (guitar); Robin Casey (violin); Joe Dizney (guitar); Sven Furberg (bass); Kurt Hoffman (tenor saxophone); Barry Root (bass); Barbara Schloss (violin); Jim Thomas (drums); Fritz Van Orden (alto saxophone); Garo Yellin (cello); Dave Soldier (violin)

The Ordinaires was a nine-piece experimental rock band from New York City. The band, which broke up in 1991, was composed of Angela Babin (guitar), Robin Casey (violin), Joe Dizney (guitar), Sven Furberg (bass), Kurt Hoffman (tenor saxophone), Barbara Schloss (violin), Jim Thomas (drums), Fritz Van Orden (alto saxophone), Garo Yellin (cello), and Peter Moffitt (cello, from 1984-1987).

Born as the early '80's New York no wave/noise movement began to take root, the band was both an outgrowth of and a reaction against the shapeless dissonance of their peers. Initially named Off-Beach, the band christened themselves The Ordinaires after completing two tracks for a Lower East Side compilation record. The name was a simplification of The Vin Ordinaires (based on the French term for table wine), and a pun on the name of band member Fritz Van Orden.

Their self-titled debut, recorded at New York's CBGB's, was released on the German Dossier label and was then released in America by Bar/None Records.

The Ordinaires are credited on the song "Kiss Me, Son Of God" by They Might Be Giants, and Kurt Hoffman would later be a part of They Might Be Giants' backing band.

Adam Duritz of the band Counting Crows is wearing a The Ordinaires shirt in the music video of their hit song Mr. Jones.

== Discography ==
=== Albums ===
- The Ordinaires - LP (1986, Dossier Records)
- One - LP/Cassette (1989, Bar/None Records)

=== Compilation Appearances ===
- Peripheral Vision - "Bands of Loisaida" - Cassette (1982, Zoar Records)
- Island of Sanity - "New Music From New York" - LP (1987, Rec-Rec Records)
- Time For A Change (1989, Bar/None Records)1989 - Time For A Change (Bar/None Records compilation)
