= Jackie Leven =

Scottish musician (1950–2011)

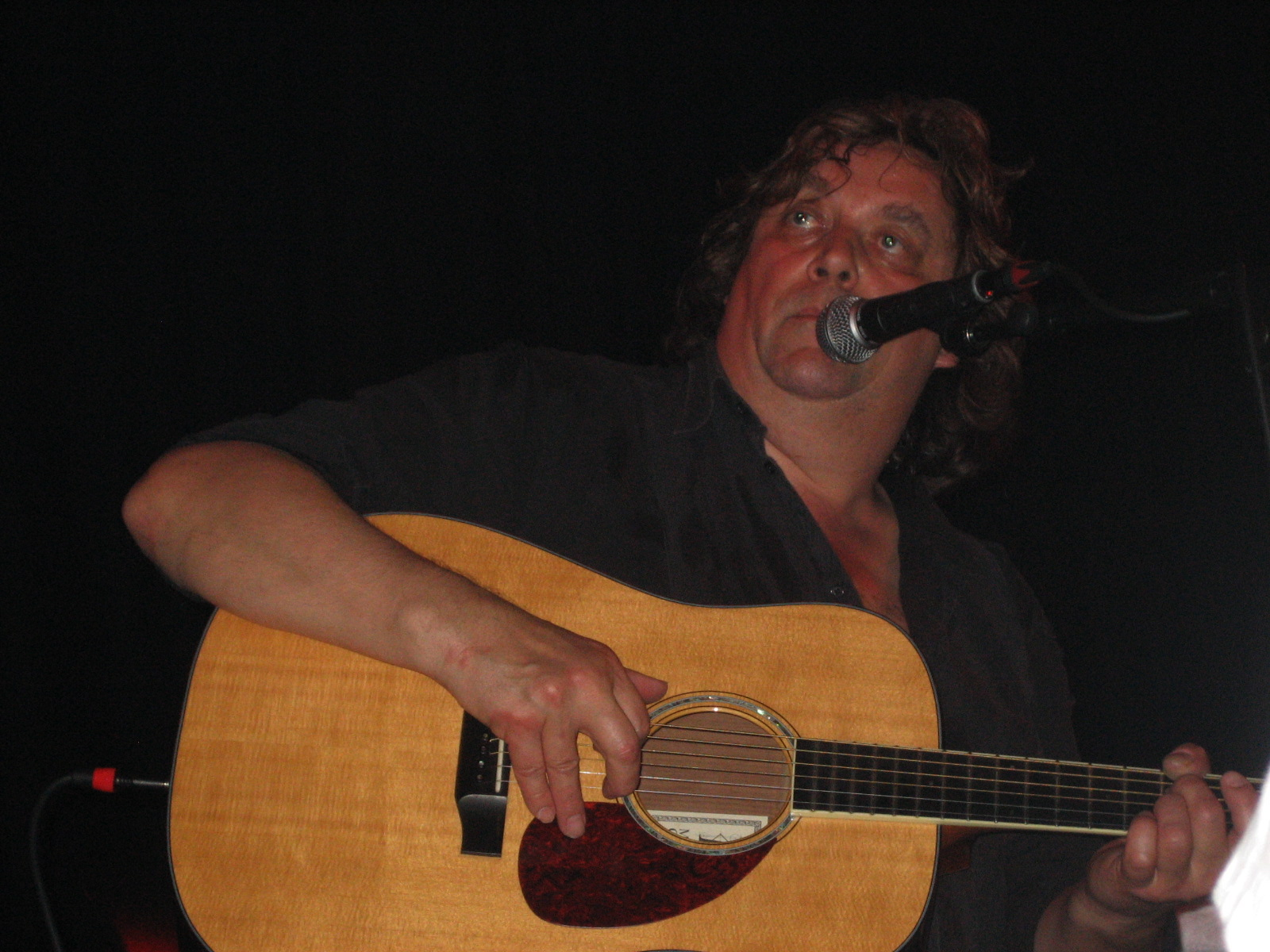
- Leven in 2007

Background information
- Also known as: John St. Field, Sir Vincent Lone
- Born: Alan Moffatt; 18 June 1950; Kirkcaldy, Fife, Scotland
- Died: 14 November 2011 (aged 61)
- Genres: Folk, Rock, Celtic blues
- Instrument: Guitar
- Years active: Late 1960s – 2011
- Label: Cooking Vinyl
- Website: jackieleven.co.uk

Jackie Leven (18 June 1950 – 14 November 2011) was a Scottish songwriter and folk musician. After starting his career as a folk musician in the late 1960s, he first found success with new wave band Doll by Doll. He later recorded as a solo artist, releasing more than twenty albums under his own name or under the pseudonym Sir Vincent Lone.

== Biography ==
Leven started his musical career in the late 1960s under the pseudonym John St Field, and recorded one album, Control, in 1971 which was released only in Spain in 1973.

He formed the band Doll by Doll in 1977. They released four albums between 1979 and 1982. After Doll by Doll disbanded in 1983, Leven began a solo career. He suffered a street assault and near strangulation during the recording of his first solo album in 1984, which left him unable to speak for nearly two years. During this time he became addicted to heroin. He also collaborated with fellow ex-Doll by Doll members Joe Shaw and David Macintosh, plus ex-Sex Pistol Glen Matlock to release the single "Big Tears" under the band name Concrete Bulletproof Invisible. The record was a Melody Maker single of the week in 1988.

Leven eventually cured himself of his addiction with the help of his wife Carol, through a combination of acupuncture and psychic healing. This led him to form The Core Trust organisation, which favours a holistic approach to the treatment of heroin addiction.

In 1994, Leven's solo career restarted with the release of the mini-album Songs from the Argyll Cycle and the full-length album The Mystery of Love is Greater than the Mystery of Death, now signed to Cooking Vinyl and recording in the folk rock style. After that he released fifteen albums, including a joint album with crime writer Ian Rankin, Jackie Leven Said, with multi-instrumentalist Michael Cosgrave. In addition to his broader commercial releases, he released a number of limited edition, fanclub-only live albums through the Haunted Valley fanzine and website.

In 2006, Leven released the album Songs For Lonely Americans using the pseudonym "Sir Vincent Lone". A second Sir Vincent Lone CD, When The Bridegroom Comes (Songs For Women), was recorded a year later. Initially sold only at live shows, it proved so successful that it eventually saw commercial release by Cooking Vinyl.

Leven wrote about the "Sir Vincent" pseudonym:

Some years ago I noticed that I was writing a lot more songs than I was ever going to record and get released, especially in these times where you can only release one studio album every eighteen months. As I am a writer of genius, this began to worry me more and more. So I went to see my Cooking Vinyl boss, Martin Goldschmidt, to ask him if I could make more records. He said no. I said to him 'look, The Beatles once released four albums in one year, and nobody said to them, hey that's too many records in one year'. Martin said 'Jackie, this is not 1967 and you are not The Beatles'. We talked some more and we agreed that I could make records under a different name – that name is Sir Vincent Lone.

Leven's next album, Lovers at the Gun Club was released in 2008; followed in 2009 by a third Sir Vincent Lone record (Troubadour Heart) plus four instalments of The Haunted Year under his own name: twofers of eight albums previously released through The Haunted Valley. Gothic Road was released in 2010, followed in September 2011, two months before his death, by Leven's final studio album, Wayside Shrines and the Code of the Travelling Man, a collaboration with Michael Cosgrave.

== Death ==
Leven died on 14 November 2011, aged 61, of cancer. Leven had been due to perform at the Green Hotel in Kinross for Mundell Music on Friday night 18 November.

== Discography ==
=== As John St Field ===
- Control (1971) – initially released on a Spanish label, reissued in 1997 by Cooking Vinyl, again reissued in 2001 by Cooking Vinyl as part of the Great Songs From Eternal Bars 4CD-set

=== As a member of Doll by Doll ===
- Remember (1979), Automatic
- Gypsy Blood (1979), Automatic
- Doll By Doll (1981), Magnet
- Grand Passion (1982), Magnet
- Revenge of Memory (Live at The Sheffield Limits Club 1977) (2003), Haunted Valley

=== As a solo artist ===
- "Love is Shining Down (On Me)" (1983) 12-inch single – 45 rpm, Charisma Music Publishing, Virgin Records UK ** The Famous Charisma Label
- "Uptown / Tropic of Cool" (1984) 12-inch and 7-inch single, Charisma

==== Commercial releases ====
- Songs from the Argyll Cycle EP (1994), Cooking Vinyl – Scotland only release
- The Mystery of Love Is Greater Than The Mystery of Death (1994), Cooking Vinyl
- The Right to Remain Silent: the Mystery Supplement EP (1994), Cooking Vinyl
- Forbidden Songs of The Dying West (1995), Cooking Vinyl – reissued as part of the Great Songs From Eternal Bars 4CD-set (2001)
- The Argyll Cycle, Volume One (1996), Cooking Vinyl
- Fairytales For Hardmen (1997), Cooking Vinyl – reissued as part of the Great Songs From Eternal Bars 4CD-set (2001)
- Night Lilies (1998), Cooking Vinyl
- Defending Ancient Springs (2000), Cooking Vinyl
- Creatures of Light And Darkness (2001), Cooking Vinyl
- Great Songs From Eternal Bars (2001), Cooking Vinyl
- Shining Brother, Shining Sister (2003), Cooking Vinyl
- For Peace Comes Dropping Slow (2004), Cooking Vinyl
- Songs For Lonely Americans (2006), Cooking Vinyl – as 'Sir Vincent Lone'
- Jackie Leven Said (2005), Cooking Vinyl – with Ian Rankin
- Elegy for Johnny Cash (2005), Cooking Vinyl
- Oh What a Blow That Phantom Dealt Me! (2007), Cooking Vinyl
- When the Bridegroom Comes (2007), Cooking Vinyl – as 'Sir Vincent Lone'
- Chip Pan Fire – Jackie Balfour (2007), Cooking Vinyl
- Lovers at the Gun Club (2008), Cooking Vinyl
- The Haunted Year – Winter (2009), Cooking Vinyl
- The Haunted Year – Spring (2009), Cooking Vinyl
- Troubadour Heart – Sir Vincent Lone (2009), Cooking Vinyl – as 'Sir Vincent Lone'
- The Haunted Year – Summer (2009), Cooking Vinyl
- The Haunted Year – Autumn (2009), Cooking Vinyl
- Gothic Road (2010), Cooking Vinyl
- Wayside Shrines and the Code of the Travelling Man (2011), Cooking Vinyl – with Michael Cosgrave
- Heroes Can Be Any Size (2012), Cooking Vinyl: Cover-mounted CD with March 2012 issue of The Word, also commercially available

==== Fanclub-only releases ====
- For Peace Comes Dropping Slow (1997), Haunted Valley – reissued by Cooking Vinyl (2004)
- Saint Judas: When I Went Out to Kill Myself (1998), Haunted Valley
- Man Bleeds in Glasgow (1999), Haunted Valley – as Jackie Leven and the Celtic Soulmen – reissued by Cooking Vinyl as The Haunted Year – Spring (2009)
- The Wanderer (1999), Haunted Valley- reissued by Cooking Vinyl as part of the Great Songs From Eternal Bars 4CD-set (2001)
- Greek Notebook (1999), Haunted Valley – reissued by Cooking Vinyl as The Haunted Year – Autumn (2009)
- Munich Blues (2000), Haunted Valley – reissued by Cooking Vinyl as The Haunted Year – Winter (2009)
- Deep In The Heart of Nowhere (2001), Haunted Valley – reissued by Cooking Vinyl as The Haunted Year – Summer (2009)
- Barefoot Days (2002) – reissued by Cooking Vinyl as The Haunted Year – Summer (2009)
- Greetings From Milford (2002), Haunted Valley – with The Stornoway Girls – reissued by Cooking Vinyl as The Haunted Year – Spring (2009)
- Men in Prison (Live from Bergen Prison) (2003), Haunted Valley – reissued by Cooking Vinyl as The Haunted Year – Winter (2009)
- Only The Ocean Can Forgive (2003), Haunted Valley – reissued by Cooking Vinyl as The Haunted Year – Autumn (2009)
- One Long Cold Morning (2011)

==== Other releases ====
- The Meeting of Remarkable Men (DVD) (2005), Cooking Vinyl
- Live at Rockpalast (DVD) (2011), Intergroove Media GmbH
