= Monster (David Thomas album) =

Box set by David Thomas
- Released: June 1997
- Genre: Rock
- Label: Rough Trade
- Producer: David Thomas

David Thomas chronology
Meadville (1997)	Monster (1997)	Mirror Man (1999)

Professional ratings
Review scores
Source	Rating
AllMusic	4.5/5 stars

Monster is a box set anthologizing David Thomas's solo career from the years 1981–1987, during which time his main vehicle, Pere Ubu, was inactive. 'Variations On A Theme' has been remixed and rearranged from its original forms. On its release in 1997, the box included a contemporary live disc entitled "Meadville" by Thomas's group the Two Pale Boys; as of the current 2002 reissue, that disc has been excised, anticipating a future standalone release.

== Track listing ==
=== CD1 - The Sound of the Sand ===
1. "The Birds Are a Good Idea" – 1:58
2. "Yiki Tiki" – 2:16
3. "Crickets in the Flats" – 4:58
4. "Sound of the Sand" – 3:27
5. "The New Atom Mine" – 5:14
6. "Big Dreams" – 2:21
7. "Happy to See You" – 3:32
8. "Crush This Horn, Part 2" – 1:49
9. "Confuse Did" – 2:32
10. "Sloop John B" – 5:09
11. "Man's Best Friend" – 4:28

=== CD2 - Variations on a Theme ===
1. "A Day at the Botanical Gardens" (1983 mix) – 3:44 (extra track on the 2002 reissue)
2. "Bird Town" – 2:44
3. "Pedestrian Walk" (1983 mix) – 4:17 (extra track on the 2002 reissue)
4. "The Egg & I" – 2:55
5. "Who Is It?" – 3:40
6. "Song of the Hoe" – 6:03
7. "Hurry Back" – 4:20
8. "The Rain" (1983 mix) – 3:48 (extra track on the 2002 reissue)
9. "Semaphore" – 5:11
10. "A Day at the Botanical Gardens" – 3:21
11. "Pedestrian Walk" – 4:31
12. "Hurry Back" (1983 mix) – 3:57 (extra track on the 2002 reissue)
13. "The Rain" – 5:18

=== CD3 - More Places Forever ===
1. "Through The Magnifying Glass" – 2:58
2. "Enthusiastic" – 4:46
3. "Whale Head King" – 5:50
4. "Song of the Bailing Man" – 4:42
5. "Big Breezy Day" – 3:23
6. "The Farmer's Wife" – 4:32
7. "New Broom" – 4:21
8. "About True Friends" – 4:35 (the original version on vinyl is approximately 5:00 long and has an accapella introduction. The version on the “Monster” box set is 3:34 and lacks the vocal introduction)

=== Monster Walks the Winter Lake ===
1. "My Theory of Spontaneous Simultude / Red Tin Bus" – 3:06
2. "What Happened to Me" – 2:45
3. "Monster Walks The Winter Lake" – 11:13
4. "Bicycle" – 4:17
5. "Coffee Train" – 2:24
6. "My Town" – 3:19
7. "Monster Magee, King of the Seas" – 2:14
8. "Monster Thinks About The Good Days" – 3:37
9. "What Happened to Me" – 2:41

=== CD4 - Blame the Messenger ===
1. "My Town" – 3:07
2. "A Fact About Trains" – 4:24
3. "King Knut" – 5:27
4. "When Love Is Uneven" – 3:27
5. "The Storm Breaks" – 3:34
6. "The Long Rain" – 4:11
7. "Havin' Time" – 4:53
8. "Friends of Stone" – 3:18
9. "The Velikovsky 2-Step" – 6:50
