= Cleveland Recording Company =

Historic recording studio in Cleveland, Ohio

Coordinates: 41.500164°N 81.682955°W

- Industry: Recording studio
- Founded: 1938
- Founder: Frederick C. Wolf
- Defunct: 1977
- Fate: Closed
- Successor: Suma Recording
- Headquarters: Cleveland, Ohio
- Number of locations: 1220 Huron Road (1938-1946); 1515 Euclid Ave (1946-1970); 1935 Euclid Ave (1970-1977)
- Key people: Frederick C. Wolf, Ken Hamann, John Hansen, Grand Funk Railroad, James Gang, The Lemon Pipers, The Human Beinz, Velvet Crest, The Outsiders

Cleveland Recording Company was a historic recording studio located in the Carnegie Hall building at 1220 Huron Road in Cleveland, Ohio. The studio produced many hit records in the 1960s and 1970s by artists such as James Gang and Grand Funk Railroad.

== History ==
Founded in 1938 by Cleveland radio announcer Frederick C. Wolf as a place to record local Slovenian musicians he was featuring on his Sunday morning Czechoslovak music programs on WGAR, the studio was Cleveland's first professional recording studio. In its early years, Wolf recorded notable Slovenian-style polka artists at the studio, including future "Polka King," Frankie Yankovic.

In 1946, Wolf incorporated the studio as Cleveland Recording Company and moved operations to the Loew's State Theater building at 1515 Euclid Avenue. In 1950, Wolf opened WCCR (AM) in the same location, and in 1954, he added radio stations WDOK-FM and WDOK-AM. Ken Hamann was hired as a staff engineer for both the radio and the recording studios, and eventually built the studio into a state-of-the-art recording and mastering facility.

Hamann recorded numerous hits at the studio, including The Outsiders' hit song "Time Won't Let Me" (1966), The Lemon Pipers' "Green Tambourine" (1967), The Human Beinz' "Nobody But Me" (1968), Velvet Crest "Look Homeward Angel" (1969), and the James Gang album Thirds (1970). Grand Funk Railroad recorded their first five studio albums at Cleveland Recording, beginning with their 1969 debut studio album. In 1975, Wild Cherry recorded their first studio album at the studio, including their hit song "Play That Funky Music".

In 1970, Hamann and production engineer John Hansen purchased Cleveland Recording Company from Wolf and moved the studio to 1935 Euclid Avenue. In 1972, Michael Bishop joined the studio as a recording and disk mastering engineer. Hamann and Hansen ended their partnership in 1977 when the property was purchased by Cleveland State University, forcing the studio to move. Hansen moved the studio to a new location and focused on commercial recording until his death in 1990.

== Legacy ==
Ken Hamann later founded Suma Recording Studio in Painesville, Ohio, with his son Paul and Michael Bishop working as recording engineers. In 1988, Bishop went on to engineer recordings for Telarc Records. Upon Ken Hamann's death in 2003, Paul Hamann took over ownership of Suma Recording, and recorded many notable artists including David Thomas and Pere Ubu, The Black Keys, Alex Bevan, Rachel Brown, Chardon Polka Band, and many others. Paul Hamann operated Suma Recording until his death in late 2017. In 2018, Suma Recording was purchased by Cleveland-based producer and audio engineer Michael Seifert. In early 2022, the studio reopened to the public, after an extensive renovation project.
