= Punk 45: Burn Rubber City, Burn! =

Compilation album by Various artists
- Released: February 10, 2015
- Genre: New wave, punk rock
- Length: 57:23
- Label: Soul Jazz

Punk 45 chronology
Punk 45: Sick on You! One Way Spit! (2014)	Punk 45: Burn, Rubber City, Burn! (2015)	Punk 45: Extermination Nights in the Sixth City (2015)

Punk 45: Burn Rubber City, Burn! (subtitled: Akron, Ohio: Punk and the Decline of the Mid-West 1975-80) is a 2015 compilation album released by Soul Jazz Records.

== Music ==
Punk 45: Burn Rubber City, Burn! is a compilation of that collects rare music independently released singles that emerged with the rise of punk and new wave from the Akron, Ohio area. Bernard Zuel of The Sydney Morning Herald described the sound of the album as moving from punk rock to new wave with some tracks embracing styles such as funk, and the "edges of electronica." Mark Deming of AllMusic felt that most of the music was new wave rather than punk with the main exception being the Rubber City Rebels. Zuel commented that much of the music was in reaction to the after-effects of protest, most predominantly the 1970 Kent State shootings.

Mark Deming of AllMusic noted that in the 1970s, Ohio was and specifically Cleveland in particular were "often used as a pop culture punch line, with comics making fun of the land of the burning river as the industrial Midwest began the long, slow decline." Some songs on the album such confront these attitudes such as Rubber City Rebels' song "Rubber City Rebels" with the lyrics "East Coast, West Coast, you can jump in the sea / I don't need no ocean, I got industry"

== Release ==
Punk 45: Burn Rubber City, Burn! was released by Soul Jazz Records on vinyl and compact disc on February 5, 2015. The album was released on the same day as another release in the series titled: Punk 45: Extermination Nights in the Sixth City about bands from Cleveland, Ohio.

== Reception ==
Professional ratings
Review scores
Source	Rating
AllMusic	4/5 stars
Pitchfork	(7.8/10)
The Sydney Morning Herald	4/5 stars

Zuel of The Sydney Morning Herald gave the album a four star out of five rating, declaring it a "rich compilation" and a natural sequel to the labels release of Punk 45: Kill the Hippies! Kill Yourself!. Mark Deming of AllMusic also gave the album four stars, stating that while Cleveland proto-punk era has been well documented over the passage of time, that the compilation showed that Akron had "nearly as many worthy bands." it offers ample evidence of how many great, off-kilter groups flourished in the Rubber City in the second half of the '70s" Deming's review concluded that "this disc summarizes a fascinating time and place in the growth of alternative rock, and though not everything here is brilliant, all of it is fascinating, and this is an unexpectedly rewarding issue in the Punk 45 series."

== Track listing ==
1. The Bizarros – "I Bizarro" (1:51)
2. The Waitresses – "The Comb" (3:03)
3. Hammer Damage – "Laugh" (3:12)
4. Devo – "Mechanical Man" (4:20)
5. Tin Huey – "Squirm You Worm" (2:43)
6. The Bizarros – "Lady Doubonette" (3:49)
7. Chi-Pig – "Ring Around The Collar" (3:50)
8. Devo – "Auto Modown" (2:01)
9. Rubber City Rebels – "Kidnapped" (3:39)
10. Denis DeFrange and Mark Frazier – "The Manikin Shuffle" (2:41)
11. Jane Aire and The Belvederes – "When I Was Young" (2:46)
12. Tin Huey – "Puppet Wipes" (2:44)
13. Chi-Pig – "Apu Api" (2:41)
14. The Bizarros – "Nova" (3:17)
15. Rubber City Rebels – "Such A Fool" (2:50)
16. Denis DeFrange – "Sector Wars" (2:31)
17. Ralph Carney – "Closet Bears" (2:44)
18. 15 60 75 Numbers Band – "Narrow Road" (6:00)
