= Deutsche Elektronische Musik 3 =

Compilation album by Various Artists
- Released: December 2017
- Genre: Krautrock
- Label: Soul Jazz
- Compiler: Adrian Self, Stuart Baker

Deutsche Elektronische Musik chronology
Deutsche Elektronische Musik 2 (2013)	Deutsche Elektronische Musik 3 (2017)	Deutsche Elektronische Musik 4 (2020)

Deutsche Elektronische Musik 3 is a 2017 compilation of krautrock music released by Soul Jazz Records.

== Music and contents ==
Deutsche Elektronische Musik 3 was a 23-track collection, and the third in the series of Soul Jazz Records collection of German krautrock, rock and electronic music. The music on the album features more well known groups from Germany like Neu! and Popol Vuh along with more obscure artists like Dzyan and Niagara. Oregano Rathbone of Record Collector found the album to contain more obscurities than previous entries. Ludovic Hunter-Tilney of Financial Times found that the claim of rock and electronic music made it "hard to discern much in the way of elektronische musik in the joss-stick fragranced sitar drones of Bröselmaschine's "Schmetterling" or Popol Vuh's Bavarian reorientation of West Coast hippy rock". Adriane Pontecorvo of PopMatters found the album drew from both British and American rock while others drew from Eastern music for inspiration such as Dzyan's "Khali".

== Release and reception ==
Professional ratings
Review scores
Source	Rating
Financial Times	4/5 stars
PopMatters	4.5/5 stars
Record Collector	4/5 stars

Deutsche Elektronische Musik 3 was released in December 2017.

Hunter-Tilney of Financial Times praised the album claiming that "there can be no faulting the snapshot provided of West Germany's thriving underground music scene between 1971 and 1981." Pontecorvo of PopMatters praised the album, finding it to be "not about name-dropping, as tends to be the case with Soul Jazz compilations" but an album that has "variety and diversity as can be packed into a single thematic compilation [...] it's ready to blow your mind with sounds and songs you never knew you wanted and a much broader picture of vintage West Germany than perhaps any previous collection of tunes has given us thus far." Oregano Rathbone of Record Collector gave the album a four star rating, declaring that "Deutsche Elektronische Musik compilations are curated with care".

== Track listing ==
Track listing adapted from the album's liner notes and sleeve.

No.	Title	Credited Performer	Length
1.	"Wide Open Space Motion"	Klaus Weiss	2:10
2.	"I'll Be Your Singer, You'll Be My Song"	A.R. & Machines	2:25
3.	"Deutscher Wald"	Deutsche Wertarbeit	4:01
4.	"Khali"	Dzyan	4:54
5.	"Geisha"	Missus Beastly	5:27
6.	"Derule"	Alex	2:52
7.	"In the Silence of the Morning Sunrise"	Agitation Free	6:32
8.	"Pearls"	Georg Deuter	2:08
9.	"The Brain of Oskar Panizza"	Michael Bundt	8:41
10.	"Ja, Deine Liebe Ist Süsser Als Wein"	Popol Vuh	3:35
11.	"Dronsz"	Novalis	4:53
12.	"Schmetterling"	Bröselmaschine	8:06
13.	"Neuschnee"	Neu!	4:04

Disc 2

No.	Title	Credited Performer	Length
1.	"And the Water Opened"	Between	10:54
2.	"White Overalls"	La Düsseldorf	2:07
3.	"Conestellation"	Klaus Weiss	1:39
4.	"Tanz Der Vögel in Den Winden"	Achim Reichel	7:29
5.	"Lustwandel"	Roedelius	3:51
6.	"Die Haut Der Frau"	Pyrolator	3:04
7.	"Hollywood"	Cluster	4:23
8.	"Passage"	Streetmark	4:25
9.	"Rhythm Go"	Niagara	2:44
10.	"Neon"	Michael Bundt	12:32
