= Boombox (disambiguation) =

A boombox is a portable stereo.

Boombox or Boom Box may also refer to:

== Music ==
=== Bands ===
- BoomBox (American band)
- BoomBox (Ukrainian band)

=== Albums ===
- Boom Box (No Doubt album), a 2003 box set by No Doubt
- Boombox (Kylie Minogue album), a 2009 remix album by Kylie Minogue
- Boombox (Robin album), a 2013 remix album by Robin
- Boombox – Early Independent Hip Hop, Electro and Disco Rap 1979–82, a 2016 compilation album from Soul Jazz Records
- Boombox, a 2011 album by Beatsteaks

=== Songs ===
- "Boombox" (song), 2016 song by Laura Marano
- "Boombox", a 1985 song by Vitabeats
- "Boombox", a 2010 song by The Lonely Island from Incredibad

== Other uses ==
- Boombox (Sirius), a breakbeat and rock remix Sirius Satellite Radio station
- The Boombox, a website owned by Townsquare Media

== See also ==
- Boom Blox, a 2008 video game
