= Punk 45: Les Punks =

Compilation album by Various artists
- Released: November 11, 2016
- Genre: Punk rock
- Length: 53:09
- Language: French, English
- Label: Soul Jazz

Punk 45 chronology
Punk 45: Chaos in the City of Angels and Devils (2016)	Punk 45: Les Punks (2016)

Punk 45: Les Punks (subtitled: The French Connection: The First Wave Of French Punk 1977-80) is a 2016 compilation album of French punk rock music by Soul Jazz Records.

== Music and content ==
France was one of the first places in Europe that embraced punk rock once the music scene began in the United Kingdom. Louis Pattison of Pitchfork described the album's historical context of the music, noting that punk rock music, despite being developed in New York and London led to France providing "much of the genre’s intellectual and aesthetic grounding." Much of the French punk on the album contains references to writers like Arthur Rimbaud and Voltaire, art movements like Dada and surrealism, and erotic provocations of Serge Gainsbourg. The album spotlights the role of figures like Paris-based Marc Zermati, whose label Skydog fostered the early connection between New York and London. The liner notes of the album proclaim that France's punk rock movement came from the countries "long-held love of revolution and rebellion."

== Release ==
Punk 45: Les Punks: The French Connection was released by Soul Jazz Records on November 11, 2016. It was released on compact disc and double vinyl.

== Reception ==
Professional ratings
Review scores
Source	Rating
AllMusic	4/5 stars
The Irish Times	3/5 stars
Pitchfork	(6.6/10)
Record Collector	4/5 stars

Pattison wrote in Pitchfork that many groups, such as Marie et les Garçons and Dogs emulated the style of New York City punk rock bands with "lots of enthusiasm but not much in the way of innovation." while others carving out more distinctive sounds such as what they described as "Perhaps the quintessential French punk group", with Métal Urbain. The review concluded that "track for track, there are compilations that cover French punk and post-punk with a better hit rate. The two volumes of Born Bad’s Des Jeunes Gens Mödernes lean further into France’s homegrown coldwave and synthwave sound and are better for it. But a snapshot of French punk’s first flush, Les Punks stands up." Tim Peacock of Record Collector praised the albums "meticulously-researched" booklet and that praised resonant tracks from later outfits such as Kas Product and Métal Urbain, while finding that "On the down side, this anthology also proves that some of France’s first wave aped The Stooges and New York Dolls a bit too vigorously."

Mark Deming of AllMusic compared the album to other releases in the Punk 45 series, noting that "if this doesn't connect as hard as the typical American or British punk comp from the same period, it does confirm France had a lively scene that left behind some admirably tough and effective sides." Deming balanced out the quality of the tracks with their obscurity, expressing that "Not everything on this collection sounds stellar in the 21st century, but even the weakest tracks here are smart and muscular rock & roll, and while most first-era punk rock from the U.S. and U.K. has been compiled to death, most of these tracks have been little heard outside their native land, making this relatively fresh listening." Jim Carroll writing for The Irish Times gave the album three stars out of five, stating that "musically, the tracks are a colourful blur of sound and fury, catching both the influence of the punkfathers on the scene (see Marie et Les Garcons and Asphalt Jungle especially) and the manner in which later arrivals put their own Gallic stamp on things.".

== Track listing ==
1. Marie et les Garçons – "Rien À Dire" (3:22)
2. Metal Boys – "Sweet Marylin" (4:08)
3. Fantomes – "I Wanna Be Your Dog" (2:56)
4. Gazoline – "Sally" (3:08)
5. A3 Dans Les WC – "Photo Couleur" (4:07)
6. Asphalt Jungle – "Planté Comme Un Privé" (2:24)
7. Warm Gun – "Broken Windows" (1:37)
8. Métal Urbain – "Paris Maquis" (3:08)
9. Electric Callas – "Kill Me Two Times" (4:09)
10. Kas Product – "Mind" (2:43)
11. 84 Flesh – "Salted City" (2:50)
12. Les Olivensteins – "Euthanasie" (2:28)
13. Angel Face – "Wolf City Blues" (3:30)
14. Guilty Razors – "Hurts And Noises" (1:42)
15. Dogs – "Here Comes My Baby" (1:59)
16. Charles De Goal – "Dans Le Labyrinthe" (2:07)
17. Guilty Razors – "I Don't Wanna Be A Rich" (2:33)
18. Marie et les Garçons – "A Bout de Souffl" (1:51)
19. Calcinator – "Électrifié" (2:03)
