= New Thing =

New Thing or The New Thing may refer to:

- Free jazz, a subgenre of jazz music often referred to as "The New Thing"
  - New Thing at Newport, a 1965 free jazz album by John Coltrane and Archie Shepp
  - The New Thing & the Blue Thing, a 1965 free jazz album by Ted Curson
  - New Thing!, a 2005 compilation album of jazz music
- New Thing (Enuff Z'Nuff song) 1989
- New Thing (Rye Rye song), 2011
- New Thang, a 2014 single by Redfoo
