= Deutsche Elektronische Musik 2 =

Compilation album by Various Artists
- Released: March 2013
- Genre: Krautrock
- Label: Soul Jazz
- Compilers: Adrian Self, Stuart Baker

Deutsche Elektronische Musik chronology
Deutsche Elektronische Musik (2010)	Deutsche Elektronische Musik 2 (2013)	Deutsche Elektronische Musik 3 (2017)

Deutsche Elektronische Musik 2 is a 2013 compilation album released by Soul Jazz Records in 2013. It was a follow-up to their 2010 record Deutsche Elektronische Musik with further tracks covering West German krautrock groups and their music released between 1971 and 1983. It received positive reviews from music publications such as AllMusic, Uncut and Record Collector as well as newspapers such as The Independent and The Province.

== Music ==
John Lewis of Uncut noted the variety of music on the album, describing it as a "hipster-friendly rebranding of what is, effectively, progressive rock from West Germany." Lewis described the variety of music from space-age electronica (Michael Hoenig and Pyrolator), proto-techno of Asmus Tietchens), and Afro-tinged funk (Can's "Halleluwah", Niagra's trance-like "Gibli"), as well as jazz-rock (Gila and Bröselmaschine). Oregano Rathbone of Record Collector noted the artists on the compilation, stating it contained the "big hitters" of the scene (Can, Faust, Amon Düül II, NEU!, and Popol Vuh while still containing obscurities such as Bröselmaschine, Niagara, You and Asmus Tietchens.

== Release ==
Deutsche Elektronische Musik 2 was announced in early 2013. The album was released in March 2013 on vinyl, compact disc and as a digital download. A follow-up release, Deutsche Elektronische Musik 3 was released in December 2017. After being out of print for over eight years, the album was re-released by Soul Jazz Records in a box set on vinyl on September 4, 2021.

== Reception ==
Professional ratings
Review scores
Source	Rating
AllMusic	4/5 stars
The Independent	4/5 stars
The Province	A-
Record Collector	4/5 stars
Uncut	(8/10)

Andy Kellman of AllMusic gave the album a four-star rating, noting again the absence of Kraftwerk on the album, while still proclaiming that the album was "another smart sampling that, depending on the listener's level of knowledge, can function either as an entry point or as a gap filler; most of the parent albums are within a range of good to tremendous." Oregano Rathbone of Record Collector also awarded the album four stars making similar statements to Kellman, noting the absence of Kraftwerk but that the album was a solid mixture of well-known and obscure groups of the genre that "still sounds like the future." Nick Coleman of The Independent gave the album a four out of five rating, referring to the album as a "sterling mix of bravery, innocence and playfulness." Stuart Derdeyn of The Province praised the album calling it "brilliantly curated" and declaring that it reinforces "the argument that some of the most interesting, progressive and cutting-edge music of the era was coming out of Germany."

== Track listing ==
Track listing adapted from the album's liner notes and sleeve.

No.	Title	Writer(s)	Credited Performer	Length
1.	"Station 1: Globus Im Selben Boot"	Achim Reichel	A.R. & Machines	2:57
2.	"Halleluwah"	Can	Can	4:42
3.	"Dino"	Dieter Moebius, Hans Joachim Roedelius, Michael Rother	Harmonia	3:29
4.	"Le Jardin"	Roedelius	Roedelius	4:26
5.	"Karussell"	Rother	Michael Rother	5:22
6.	"Sun and Moon"	Michael Hoenig	Michael Hoenig	4:13
7.	"You Play For Us Today"	Agitation Free	Agitation Free	6:15
8.	"Co Co Pino"	Deutsch Amerikanische Freundschaft	D.A.F.	3:23
9.	"Emphasis"	Harald Grosskopf	Harald Grosskopf	4:54
10.	"A Morning Excuse"	Amon Düül II	Amon Düül II	3:17
11.	"Fata Morgana"	Conrad Schnitzler, Wolf Sequenza	Conrad Schnitzler & Wolf Sequenza	5:12
12.	"Nossa Bova"	Bröselmaschine	Bröselmaschine	8:06
13.	"Base & Apex"	Brian Eno, Moebius, Roedelius	Eno, Moebius & Roedelius	4:30
14.	"In a Sacred Manner"	Conny Veit	Gila	4:41
15.	"Himmelblau"	Wolfgang Riechmann	Wolfgang Riechmann	8:44

Disc 2

No.	Title	Writer(s)	Credited Performer	Length
1.	"Als Hätte Ich Das Alles Schon Mal Gesehen (...As If I Have Seen All This Before)"	Achim Reichel	A.R. & Machines	5:28
2.	"Sacred Chant"	Veit	Gila	4:10
3.	"Isi"	Klaus Dinger, Rother	Neu!	5:00
4.	"Danger Cruising"	Kurt Dahlke	Pyrolator	3:15
5.	"Die Weisse Alm"		Sergius Golowin	5:55
6.	"Electric Day"	Albin Meskes, Udo Hanten, Ulrich Weber	You	5:48
7.	"Gibli"	Klaus Weiss	Niagara	5:26
8.	"Ja, Sie Sollen Gottes Kinder Heissen, Agnus Dei, Agnus Dei"	Florian Fricke	Popol Vuh	2:42
9.	"Der Prophet"	Rolf Trostel	Rolf Trostel	9:42
10.	"China"	Jörg Ohlert, Klaus Lormann, Wolf Fabian	Electric Sandwich	8:08
11.	"Zeebrügge"	Asmus Tietchens	Asmus Tietchens	7:01
12.	"Krautrock"	Faust	Faust	11:47
