= In the Beginning There Was Rhythm =

In the Beginning There Was Rhythm may refer to:

- In the Beginning There Was Rhythm (album), 2002 compilation album by various artists
- "In the Beginning There Was Rhythm / Where There's a Will...", 1980 split-single by The Pop Group and The Slits
