= Steppas' Delight =

Compilation album
- Released: May 19, 2008
- Genre: Dubstep
- Label: Soul Jazz
- Compiler: Emma Warren

Steppas' Delight chronology
Steppas' Delight (2008)	Steppas' Delight 2 (2009)

Steppas' Delight is a 2008 compilation album by Soul Jazz Records. The album is a compilation of dubstep music from various artists.

== Background ==
Brandon Ivers of XLR8R declared that during 2008 "seemingly everyone is releasing some sort of compilation [about dubstep] before the current run of self-mythologizing has had a chance to stick."

== Release ==
Steppas' Delight was initially announced as being released by the end of March 2008. It was released later on May 19 with a release party on May 17 with Kode9, Hatcha, Crazy D, Chef & LD, Geiom, Ikonika, and the Soul Jazz Soundsystem performing at Electrowerkz in the UK. The album was released on compact disc and vinyl record. A follow-up, titled Steppas' Delight 2, was released on September 28, 2009.

== Reception ==
Professional ratings
Review scores
Source	Rating
The Guardian	4/5 stars

Alex Macpherson of The Guardian declared the album to be a "beautifully packaged dubstep compendium" that showcased the music as "living, breathing music" that "perfectly captures the intense physicality at the heart of dubstep." Ivers found that Steppas' Delight felt he did not know the audience for the album, stating "if it's meant to educate dubstep novices, 19 unmixed tracks make for an awfully monotonous listen." noting that "great tracks" such as Shackleton's "Blood on My Hands" "wears thin when not used as a mixing tool."

== Track listing ==
1. Kode9 – "9 Samurai" (3:40)
2. Benga – "Evolution" (5:14)
3. Search and Destroy – "Candy Floss (Loefah Mix)" (5:17)
4. Plastician featuring Skepta – "Intensive Snare" (3:48)
5. Uncle Sam –"Round The World Girls (Tes La Rok Mix)" (5:43)
6. The Bug and Warrior Queen –"Poison Dart" (3:51)
7. Goth Trad –"Genesis" (5:29)
8. Seventeen Evergreen –"Ensonique (Bi-Polar Man Mix)" (4:36)
9. Martyn –"Broken" (5:24)
10. Shackleton –"Blood On My Hands" (7:30)
1. TRG –"Broken Heart" (5:43)
2. Joker –"Gullybrook Lane (Instrumental)" (4:18)
3. Quest –"Hardfood" (5:11)
4. Ikonika –"Please" (4:38)
5. Silkie –"Dam 4" (4:39)
6. Geiom featuring Marita –"Reminissin'" (5:38)
7. Shonx –"Canton" (6:27)
8. Gatekeeper – featuring Grizla –"Shade Darker" (6:10)
9. Peverelist –"Roll With the Punches" (6:44)
