= Tim Wright (English musician) =

British composer

Tim Wright was active as a musician and composer from the early 1990s until his death in 2025, working predominantly at the experimental end of the spectrum of electronica and dance music. Besides his birth name, Wright worked under various names, most notably Germ. He also worked under the name Tube Jerk, a solo project. He was a founding member of Sand, a five-piece experimental rock/jazz/electronic group. Other pseudonyms he has used include Pin, Moondog, Asphere, Speed Baby.

== Germ ==
Wright's first commercially available releases were under the pseudonym Germ. Described as "one of the most influential, under-recognized forces of innovation in the European experimental electronic music scene" (Sean Cooper, Allmusic), Germ was initially a solo bedroom project but grew with the aid of engineer John Dalby at Finsbury Park Studios to encompass collaborations with Hilary Jeffery (trombone), Matt Miles (double bass) and Nicholas Bullen (electric bass).

Germ released three EPs and two albums, "Gone" and "Parrot" on General Productions Recordings (GPR) in 1995. Wright continued to use the Germ name for the occasional remix, the most recent being of John Richards' "Suite for Piano and Electronics" (2007 Nonclassical).

== Tube Jerk ==
When GPR ceased trading in 1996 Wright was temporarily forced to abandon the Germ name and went on to pursue a more dance-floor friendly sound with his solo project Tube Jerk. After commissioning the Germ remix of African Nightflight's "Make up your Mind" Sean Mayo, then head of PIAS UK offshoot iLL Recordings, persuaded Wright to tailor his sound for a techno/club audience with the Tube Jerk project. The Tube Jerk sound was instantly recognisable with its use of enormous rolling drum and bass style bass-lines and tight house-influenced drum parts. Still active to date, two full-length albums have been released, "Shift" (2003 on Sativae Recordings) and "Fold" (1999 on iLL Recordings) as well as a number of remixes and vinyl only EPs.

The two most commonly cited examples of the Tube Jerk sound are "Eight" on the album Fold, and the Tube Jerk remix of Cristian Vogel's "Whipaspank" (2000 on Novamute).

== Tim Wright ==
The Vogel remix brought with it the attentions of Mute Records's legendary electronic subsidiary Novamute which commissioned Wright to produce two 12" vinyl EPs "Searcher/The Walk" (2001) and "Going Down/ The Lunge" (2002) under his own name. These EPs fused a 2step or UK garage rhythmic sensibility with the darkness and power of Wright's techno production approach, proving a success with techno, UK garage and breaks audiences alike. The tracks were licensed widely, appearing on compilations from the Plump DJs "Urban Underground – The Break Beat Elite" to Player and Remady's "Sweet and Sexy – How 2 Step 2" (EMI).

Wright went on to record an album "Thirst" which was released on Novamute in 2004, featuring vocal contributions from Toastie Tailor and Juice Aleem (from UK hip hop group New Flesh).

Remix credits under his own name include Goldfrapp and Mediengruppe Telekommander. Notable live performances were at Sónar by Night, Barcelona 2004 and Transmusicales, Rennes 2004 where his laptop crashed in front of 12,000 people.

== Sand ==
Parallel to his solo work Wright was also a founder member of Sand, a five-piece experimental rock/jazz/electronic group with Hilary Jeffery (trombone), John Richards (double and electric bass), Neil Griffiths (guitar and films) and Rowan Oliver (drums/percussion). Sand performed live for the first time at The Spotted Cow in York in June 1995 with drummer Ben Clark.

Their early work was dominated by a jazz aesthetic, with Wright's role primarily one of manipulating the acoustic sound of the instrumentalists in real time. As a relationship developed with Soul Jazz Records owner Stuart Baker the sound became more focussed and guitar oriented, whilst maintaining an improvisatory approach to recording and performing.

Sand have released three albums, Beautiful People Are Evil (1999 Satellite Records/Soul Jazz Records), Still Born Alive (2001 Satellite Records/Soul Jazz Records) and The Dalston Shroud (2006 Soul Jazz Records) and several 12" vinyl EPs.

Sand's collaboration with noted choreographer Saburo Teshigawara resulted in the creation of the piece Green which has been performed at the New National Theatre, Tokyo (2000, 2002) and the Melbourne International Arts Festival (2005).

== Parrot Music ==
Wright also worked as head engineer at Parrot Music (formerly Finsury Park Studios) in York. Described as a "private recording studio" it is where most of his work was recorded. He is credited as engineer on the majority of the output of UK hip hop group New Flesh (Big Dada).

== Personal life ==
He studied for a PhD in composition of Electroacoustic music at the University of York in 2013. He died in 2025.
