= New York Noise (album) =

Compilation album by Various artists
- Released: July 30, 2003
- Genre: No wave, dance-punk, avant-funk, hip-hop
- Length: 70:58
- Label: Soul Jazz
- Compiler: Stuart Baker and Adrian Self

New York Noise is a 2003 compilation album released by Soul Jazz Records. The music of the album compiles features the genre-bending music from New York City released during the late '70s and early '80s, ranging from no wave to mutant disco to hip-hop to art funk among others. On its release, it received positive reviews from AllMusic, Pitchfork Media and Rolling Stone. A new version of the album with several track re-arrangements was released in 2016.

== Release ==
New York Noise was released by Soul Jazz Records by June 30, 2003. A followup release, titled New York Noise 2 was released later by Soul Jazz. A new version of the album was released in 2016 with a different tracklisting, adding tracks by artists such as Alan Vega, Chain Gang and Implog.

== Reception ==
Professional ratings
Aggregate scores
Source	Rating
Metacritic	80/100
Review scores
Source	Rating
AllMusic	4.5/5 stars
Pitchfork	8.4/10

At Metacritic, which assigns a normalised rating out of 100 to reviews from mainstream critics, the album has received an average score of 80, indicating universal acclaim, based on seven reviews. Andy Kellman of AllMusic praised the album, stating that "Compilations like this are necessary because they document bygone fragments of time and keep them alive for younger generations. Compilations like this are dangerous because they tend to fall in the hands of young bands who spend more time looking behind than ahead. Besides, who's to say that no wave and post-punk won't spawn their own analogs of traditional blues musicians -- if they haven't already? Still, New York Noise is another title demonstrating that the late '70s and early '80s were awesome for music." Andy Beta of Pitchfork Media praised the album, but compared it to a previous similar compilation by Soul Jazz, In the Beginning There Was Rhythm, stating that "It's long-winded at seventy-one minutes, as most Soul Jazz overviews tend to stay concise (their post-punk counterpart from the UK, In the Beginning was Rhythm, was a half-hour shorter), but trying to assimilate all the important foundations that arose out of this particular lot of ground is near impossible. Lydia Lunch and James "Blood" Ulmer are left out, unfortunately, but there are many vying for its cramped space, and inclusion of The Dance and The Blood surprises. From hip-hop to no-wave, jazz-punk disco to house music to electroclash, sleek funk to crusty noise, there's a lot to cover, and Soul Jazz does the job admirably, touring the biggest landmarks and some of the interesting diversions not on the map, but nonetheless co-existing side by side." The album received praises from Rolling Stone and Q.

Uncut gave the album a negative review, declaring that the "vast majority of it still sounds like what it was: cerebral, bloodless 'dance' music for junkies, the kind of posturing Gotham tripe we used to describe as "atonal" and "angular.""

== Track listing ==
Track listing adapted from the liner notes.

No.	Title	Writer(s)	Credited Performer	Length
1.	"Optimo"	Dennis Young, Richard McGuire, Salvatore Principato, Scott Hartley	Liquid Liquid	2:42
2.	"Baby Dee"	Dana Vlcek, Jonny Sender, Richard Edson, Shannon Dawson	Konk	6:02
3.	"Do Dada"	Eugenie Diserio. Steve Alexander	The Dance	3:08
4.	"Reduction"	Material	Material	5:26
5.	"Wawa"	Erik Fitoussi, Lizzy Mercier Descloux, Michel Esteban	Lizzy Mercier Descloux	2:21
6.	"5:30"	Arto Lindsay, Ikue Mori, Tim Wright	DNA	1:10
7.	"Beat Bop"	K-Rob, Rammellzee	Rammellzee and K-Rob	9:59
8.	"Contort Yourself"	James Siegfried	The Contortions	4:23
9.	"Lesson No.1 (For Electric Guitar)"	Glenn Branca	Glenn Branca	8:13
10.	"Button Up"	Adele Bertei, Annie Toone, Brenda Alderman, Kathleen Campbell	The Bloods	3:05
11.	"Clean On Your Bean #1"	Arthur Russell, Peter Gordon	Dinosaur L	6:38
12.	"You Got Me"	Branca	Theoretical Girls	4:00
13.	"Can't Be Funky"	Cynthia Sley, Dee Pop, Laura Kennedy, Pat Place	Bush Tetras	2:43
14.	"Helen Fordsdale"	China Burg, Mark Cunningham, Nancy Arlen, Sumner Crane	Mars	2:43
15.	"You Make No Sense"	Renee Scroggins	ESG	2:20
16.	"Defunkt"	Defunkt, Janos Gat, Joseph Bowie	Defunkt	6:24

== Credits ==
Credits adapted from the liner notes.

- Stuart Baker – compiler
- Adrian Self – compiler, sleeve design
- Rent Boyd – design
- Patrick Coupar – liner notes
- Pete Reilly – mastering
- Duncan Cowell – mastering
- Weasel Walter – photography
