= Tropicalia (disambiguation) =

Tropicália is a Brazilian art movement.

Tropicalia may also refer to:

- Tropicália: A Brazilian Revolution in Sound, a 2006 compilation album
- Tropicália: ou Panis et Circencis, a 1968 compilation album
- Tropicália 2, an album by Caetano Veloso and Gilberto Gil, 1993
- "Tropicalia" (song) by Beck, 1998
