= Chicano Power! =

Compilation album
- Released: September 1998
- Length: 76:05
- Label: Soul Jazz
- Compiler: Stuart Baker

Chicano Power! (subtitled: Latin Rock In The USA 1968-1976) is a 1998 compilation album released by Soul Jazz Records. The album contains Latin bands predominantly from the United States during the late 1960s and 1970s who combined rock, jazz and Latin music. The album was released to positive reception from online music database AllMusic, but to more indifferent or mixed reviews from The Guardian and the NME.

== Music and content ==
Chicano Power is a compilation album that focuses on Latin bands throughout the United States who combined rock, jazz, and Latin music in the late 1960s and 1970s. Richie Unterberger of AllMusic noted that despite the title, the album contained music beyond Mexican-American bands from Los Angeles and San Francisco, but also Puerto Rican-American groups and artists from New York and Miami. The music is primarily protest songs.

== Release ==
The album was released in September 1998 on compact disc and vinyl record.

== Reception ==
Professional ratings
Review scores
Source	Rating
AllMusic	4.5/5 stars
The Guardian	3/5 stars
NME	(6/10)

Unterberger of AllMusic commented that "At its best, this collection, like early Santana, is an intoxicating mix of rock, R&B, psychedelia, jazz, and Latin music; even at its least impressive, it's still pretty enjoyable. Santana themselves are represented by the song that's probably the apex of the whole musical movement, "Soul Sacrifice." The only major complaint one could offer is that 75 minutes of music is spread throughout two discs, and could have been combined onto one CD." Dan Glaister compared the album unfavorably to Soul Jazz Records previous release of Nu Yorica!, finding that while Nu Yorica! had "some truly wonderful music going for it, Chicano Power! has at best, Santana's Soul Sacrifice, and at worst, well, any number of sub-standard rock cliches fused with familiar Latin rhythms." Glaister noted that albums liner notes which document the "brief but fascinating period of political and cultural change, charting the rise and fall of the Chicano Power Movement [...] yet the musical impact of the movement was minimal - Santana aside." Dele Fadele of the NME declared that the album was "mainly of interest to archivists and nostalgists. Anyone who cares about where Latinos are going in America today, on a musical level, would do better to search out current releases. For the record, 'Chicano Power!...' is a compendium of mostly disappeared groups who made mainstream sense in the context of hippies, Jefferson Airplane and San Francisco flower power."

== Track listing ==
Disc 1

1. Sapo – "Been Had" (5:30)
2. Black Sugar – "It's Too Late" (3:00)
3. Chango – "Mira Pa Ca" (2:51)
4. Harvey Averne Barrio Band – "Cayuco" (5:21)
5. Tierra – "Sun God" (2:39)
6. Benitez – "Night Life" ( 4:22)
7. Malo – "Street Man" (4:55)
8. El Chicano – "Ron Con Con" (3:46)
9. Mother Night – "Fools Are You" (4:46)

Disc 2

1. Santana – "Soul Sacrifice" (4:53)
2. Black Sugar – "Viajecito" (5:08)
3. Toro – "Ramona" (4:04)
4. Malo – "Pana" (6:45)
5. The Antiques – "Chaucha" (2:49)
6. Benitez – "Butterfly" (2:29)
7. Azteca – "Azteca Theme" (4:36)
8. Sapo – "Sapo's Montuno" (6:07)
