= The Rumble in the Jungle (disambiguation) =

The Rumble in the Jungle was a historic boxing event in Kinshasa, Zaire (now Democratic Republic of the Congo), on October 30, 1974.

Rumble in the Jungle may also refer to:

- Rumble in the Jungle (compilation album), a 2007 compilation album released by Soul Jazz Records
- Rumble in the Jungle (DJ Maphorisa, Kabza De Small and Tresor album), a 2021 collaborative album
- Rumble in the Jungle (song), a song recorded for the 1996 documentary film When We Were Kings
- Rumble in the Jungle, a book in the Geronimo Stilton series
