= 100% Dynamite! =

Compilation album by Various Artists
- Released: November 9, 1998
- Genre: Reggae
- Length: 49:23
- Label: Soul Jazz
- Compiler: SoulJazzSoundSystem

100% Dynamite! is a 1998 compilation album of reggae music from the 1960s and 1970s released by Soul Jazz Records. The music is a collection of ska, rocksteady and Jamaican funk music. It was reissued in 2015 with bonus tracks.

== Release ==
100% Dynamite! was originally released on November 9, 1998. The album was re-issued 17 years later in 2015 with five bonus tracks. The compilation led to a series of reggae releases by Soul Jazz called the Dynamite series which Jim Carroll of The Irish Times called the labels biggest seller. Follow-ups include 200% Dynamite, 300% Dynamite, and 400% Dynamite. In the book The Rough Guide to Reggae, the reviewers noted that the tracks in the compilation series often filled dancefloors as the Soul Jazz sessions in London for years in 2001.

== Reception ==
Professional ratings
Review scores
| Source | Rating |
|---|---|
| AllMusic | 4/5 stars |
| Mojo | 4/5 stars |
| Muzik | 5/5 stars |
| The Irish Times | 4/5 stars |

From contemporary reviews, Kevin Braddock of Muzik praised the album, calling it a "wealth of ingeniously lo-fi tunes wrought with impeccable taste and humor." and listed the album as the Compilation of the Month in their December 1998 issue.

From retrospective reviews, a reviewer in Mojo declared the album an "outstanding comp of Clement Dodd-licensed reggaefied soul, funk and jazz nuggets from Tommy McCook, Cedrick 'Im' Brooks and others." Caroll described the album as a release that "kickstarted a dynasty" and that the series as a whole "becoming a rewarding guide to reggae's most infectious back pages."

== Track listing ==
1. Willie Williams – "Armageddon Time" (2:31)
2. The Maytals – "Night and Day" (2:49)
3. The Marvels – "Rock Steady" (3:05)
4. The Upsetters – "Popcorn" (2:05)
5. Tommy McCook – "Green Mango" (3:40)
6. Brentford All Stars – "Greedy G" (3:37)
7. Lennie Hibbert – "Real Hot" (2:27)
8. Johnny Osbourne – "We Need Love" (3:36)
9. Jackie Mittoo – "Stereo Freeze" (3:05)
10. Cedric Im Brooks – "Give Rasta Glory" (4:21)
11. Sound Dimension – "Granny Scratch Scratch" (3:56)
12. Phyllis Dillon – "Woman of the Ghetto" (3:22)
13. Lloyd Robinson – "Cuss Cuss" (6:27)
14. Sound Dimension – "Drum Song" (4:22)
