= Try out =

Try Out or Tryout may refer to:

- The Try Out, a 1916 American silent comedy film featuring Oliver Hardy
- Try Out (Kas Product album), 1982
- Tryout (journal), an amateur press journal published from 1914 to 1946
- Tryout (theatre), an early staging of a theatrical production for evaluation
