= Dance hall (disambiguation) =

A dance hall is a room for dancing.

Dance hall or dancehall may also refer to:

== Music ==
- Dance hall (Jamaican), a music venue in Jamaica
- Dancehall, a musical genre
  - Dancehall a 2008 compilation album of the above genre
- "Dance Hall", a song by Modest Mouse on the album Good News for People Who Love Bad News

== Film ==
- Dance Hall (1929 film), an American musical
- Dance Hall (1931 film), a French drama film
- Dance Hall (1941 film), an American comedy film
- Dance Hall (1950 film), a British film
