= Junglist! Old Skool Ragga, D&B, Jungle 1993–95 =

Compilation album by Various artists
- Released: 23 January 2026
- Genre: Jungle
- Length: 73:07
- Label: Soul Jazz Records

Junglist! Old Skool Ragga, D&B, Jungle 1993–95 is a compilation album of jungle music released by Soul Jazz Records in January 2026.

== Background and release ==
Jungle first appeared in the UK in the early 1990s, combining influences from breakbeat hardcore, dancehall, Belgian new beat, and Detroit techno. Early jungle producers used contemporary technology like the Akai S950 sampler and Cubase audio software to make the tracks, initially with unauthorised reggae samples, and later at the request of labels like Greensleeves and Fashion.

Junglist! was released by Soul Jazz Records on 23 January 2026. Soul Jazz had previously released two other jungle compilations, Rumble in the Jungle in 2007 and Black Riot in 2020.

== Content ==
The first track on Junglist! is "Surrender" by M-Beat, which samples the Laurie Johnson Orchestra, Terror Fabulous, and Kenny Knots. M-Beat has a second track on the album, "Rumble", which samples Buju Banton, Bagga Worries, and Hijack.

The track "Big Things" by Bizzy B and TDK, credited as Dub Two, was originally released as a white label record in 1995; in a review for AllMusic, Paul Simpson described it as "delivering an onslaught of brutal breakbeats". Multiple tracks on the album make significant use of the Amen break. Several tracks also feature Jamaican ragga vocalists, including Poison Chang on "Love The Woman", and Cutty Ranks on "Original Ranks".

Manu Ekanayake of the Quietus described the final track "Jah Love" by Lemon D as "probably the track here that most anticipates the later popularity of drum & bass".

== Critical reception ==
Professional ratings
Review scores
Source	Rating
AllMusic	4.5/5 stars
Mojo	4/5 stars

Simpson described Junglist! as "essential for anyone who's into jungle in its purest, uncut form." In a review for Mojo, Ian Harrison wrote that "this set goes straight to the hardest places and stays there...it can be formulaic, but when it's this deadly, bring on the soundalikes." In the Wire, Steve Barker called the album "the biggest jungle splash for a long time," because of how little jungle music had previously been released on vinyl.

Ekanayake wrote that Junglist! reminded him of the 1994 Channel 4 documentary All Junglists: A London Somet'ing Dis, due to their shared "fresh underground attitude".

== Track listing ==
No.	Title	Artist	Length
1.	"Surrender"	M-Beat	3:23
2.	"Original Ranks" (Just Jungle remix)	Cutty Ranks	5:31
3.	"Squeeze"	DJ Vern and DJ Ash	6:02
4.	"Big Things"	Dub Two (Bizzy B & TDK)	4:50
5.	"Jungle Tempo"	Redrose	6:25
6.	"Ruffneck Scouts"	Krome & Time	6:23
7.	"Ragga Ragga Ragga" (Whitehouse Crew remix)	Terror Fabulous	4:45
8.	"Rumble" (original mix)	M-Beat	4:06
9.	"Screwface"	Brainkillers	5:06
10.	"Love the Woman" (DJ Rap remix)	Poison Chang	4:51
11.	"Dub Select"	Bizzy B & MT	4:57
12.	"Bunn the Sensi" (Dub Hustlers remix)	Top Cat	5:55
13.	"Build Me 3 Coffins" (New Blood Crew remix)	Josey Wales; Beenie Man; Ini Kamoze	5:10
14.	"Jah Love"	Lemon D	5:50
Total length:			73:07
