= Dancehall (album) =

Compilation album by Various Artists
- Released: 2008
- Genre: Dancehall
- Label: Soul Jazz
- Compiler: Stuart Baker

Dancehall (subtitled: The Rise of Jamaican Dancehall Culture) is a 2008 compilation album of dancehall music released between the late 1970s and 1993.

== Release and reception ==
Professional ratings
Review scores
Source	Rating
The Australian	4.5/5 stars
The Observer	4/5 stars

Dancehall was released by Soul Jazz Records in 2008 on compact disc, mp3, and vinyl record.

Gareth Grundy of The Observer declared it a "succinct documentary of the glory years of reggae wayward little brother" that would appeal to newcomers and aficionados alike. John Doran of The Quietus praised Soul Jazz for "concentrating on the cream of the many excellent riddims and styles the genre threw up rather than giving space to the objectionable.", referring to not including more homophobic dancehall songs like "Boom Bye Bye" by Buju Banton. Doran echoed Grundy's review that it would appease novice dancehall fans and general fans and lives up to the high standards of their other compilations such as Rumble in the Jungle and In the Beginning There Was Rhythm. Gervase de Wilde of The Daily Telegraph praised the album as being comprehensive, and that it "showcases both its relentless innovation and moments of crossover appeal." Stevie Chick found the album was "like a wide-ranging survey of the greatest Jamaican pop of its loosely-defined era" and "feels less like a dry old musicology lecture and more like a party-proof all-killer mixtape culled from arguable Golden Age."

== Track listing ==
Disc One

1. Yellowman - "Bam Bam" (3:14)
2. Tenor Saw - "Pumpkin Belly" (3:17)
3. Reggie Stepper - "Cu-Oonuh" (3:43)
4. Chaka Demus & Pliers - "Murder She Wrote" (4:06)
5. Pinchers - "Agony" (3:32)
6. Michigan & Smiley - "Diseases" (3:31)
7. Ini Kamoze - "World A Music" (5:36)
8. Junior Murvin - "Cool Out Son" (3:08)
9. Triston Palma - "Entertainment" (7:09)
10. General Echo - "Arleen" (3:01)
11. Barrington Levy - "Here I Come" (3:45)
12. Cutty Ranks - "Chop Chop" (3:07)
13. Lone Ranger - "M16" (3:23)
14. Super Cat - "Trash and Ready" (2:48)
15. Trinity - "Jamaican Dollar" (3:11)
16. Cornell Campbell - Boxing (4:09)
17. Gregory Isaacs - "Soon Forward" (6:24)

Disc Two

1. Conroy Smith - "Dangerous" (3:48)
2. Jacob Miller & Trinity - "I'm Just A Dread/One Shut" (6:24)
3. Lady Ann - "Informer" (3:26)
4. Brigadier Jerry - "Fred Locks A Dreadlocks" (4:10)
5. Eek A Mouse - "Wa Do Dem" (7:41)
6. Sister Nancy - "Only Woman DJ With Degree" (3:27)
7. Early B - "Deaf Ears" (3:42)
8. Trinity - "Uptown Girl" (3:08)
9. Toyan - "Spar With Me" (4:13)
10. Horace Ferguson - "Sensi Addict" (3:47)
11. Clint Eastwood - "Jump and Pawn" (3:19)
12. Half Pint - "Greetings" (3:43)
13. Reggie Stepper - "Under Mi Sin Ting" (3:23)
14. Frankie Paul - "Call the Brigade" (3:34)
15. General Echo - "Track Shoes" (3:41)
16. Cornell Campbell - "Mash You Down" (7:13)
