= Punk 45: Sick on You! One Way Spit! =

Compilation album by Various artists
- Released: May 6, 2014
- Genre: Proto-punk
- Length: 77:34
- Label: Soul Jazz
- Compiler: Jon Savage

Punk 45 chronology
Punk 45: There Is No Such Thing As Society (2014)	Punk 45: Sick on You! One Way Spit! (2014)	Punk 45: Burn, Rubber City, Burn! (2015)

Punk 45: Sick on You! One Way Spit! (subtitled: After the Love & Before the Revolution, Vol. 3: Proto-Punk 1970-77) is a 2014 compilation album released by Soul Jazz Records. The album was released to positive reviews from publications such as AllMusic and Record Collector as well as Rolling Stone who included it on their list of top reissues of 2014.

== Music and content ==
The music on Punk 45: Sick on You! One Way Spit! has been described as proto-punk from Oklahoma, Cleveland, San Francisco, Los Angeles, Baltimore and Montpellier, France.

== Release ==
Punk 45: Sick on You! One Way Spit! was released by Soul Jazz Records on May 6, 2014. It was released on compact disc and double vinyl. The album was followed by two releases released on February 10, 2015: Punk 45: Burn, Rubber City, Burn! and Punk 45: Extermination Nights in the Sixth City.

== Reception ==
Professional ratings
Review scores
Source	Rating
AllMusic	4/5 stars
Record Collector	4/5 stars

Tim Peacock of Record Collector gave the album four stars out of five, while noting that "Much of the truly gobsmacking gear, though, hails from 1975-76", specifically noting The Count Bishops and The 101ers while finding that music by Cabaret Voltaire Death "both serve notice that some of the more enlightened clatter soon to be labelled “punk” wouldn't necessarily be fashioned from just three hastily cribbed chords." Fred Thomas of AllMusic noted similar statements of the later tracks being the more interesting, noting that "the true roots of punk's experimental, feral, and deeply outsider perspectives are best explored on tracks recorded a few years later", specifically mentioning tracks by Death, electric eels, and Cabaret Voltaire. The review concluded that the album"does an amazing job corralling some of the various wild sounds from that nebulous time, anchoring the untameable numerous directions of its playlist with a finely considered flow and top-notch curation."

Rolling Stone included the album in their list of the best 2014 reissues. Christopher R. Weingarten of Rolling Stone compared it to the documentary film A Band Called Death, finding that bands could "accidentally invent punk rock, even if you were 600 miles away from CBGB's." finding the compilation loaded with "blown-out, abrasive stuff that predates punk's attitude, if not sound"

== Track listing ==
1. Debris' – "One Way Spit" (2:43)
2. George Brigman – "Jungle Rot" (3:40)
3. Death – "Politicians In My Eyes" (5:49)
4. The Hammersmith Gorillas – "You Really Got Me" (2:49)
5. Crime – "Hot Wire My Heart" (3:20)
6. Mirrors – "She Smiled Wild" (4:06)
7. Hollywood Brats – "Sick On You" (5:09)
8. Pastiche – "Derilect Boulevard" (3:31)
9. Cabaret Voltaire – "Makes Your Mouth Go Funny" (4:40)
10. Jack Ruby – "Hit And Run" (2:30)
11. Victoria Vein and The Thunderpunks – "Rear Guard Action" (3:53)
12. electric eels – "Cyclotron" (2:05)
13. The Count Bishops – "Ain't Got You" (1:50)
14. Rob Jo Star Band – "Acid Revolution" (4:48)
15. The 101'ers – "Keys To Your Heart" (3:42)
16. Killer Kane Band – "Mr Cool" (4:15)
17. Simply Saucer – "Here Come The Cyborgs, Pt. 2" (6:45)
18. Zolar X – "Space Age Love" (3:20)
19. Hector – "Wired Up" (2:55)
20. Stavely Makepeace – "(I Wanna Love You Like A) Mad Dog" (3:43)
21. Radio Pete – "(Just A) Patsy" (2:12)
