= Punk 45: Chaos in the City of Angels and Devils =

Compilation album by Various artists
- Released: March 18, 2016
- Genre: Punk rock
- Length: 49:09
- Label: Soul Jazz

Punk 45 chronology
Punk 45: Extermination Nights in the Sixth City (2015)	Punk 45: Chaos in the City of Angels and Devils (2016)	Punk 45: Les Punks (2016)

Punk 45: Chaos in the City of Angels and Devils (subtitled: Hollywood From X to Zero & Hardcore on the Beaches: Punk In Los Angeles 1977-81) is a 2016 compilation album released by Soul Jazz Records. The album compiles early music from the Los Angeles punk rock music scene from various intendent music labels, such as Dangerhouse, Upsetter and Bomp! Records.

== Music and content ==
On discussing the music on the album, as being punk rock from Los Angeles. Deming went on to note that at the time it was "conventional wisdom in rock & roll was that Los Angeles was the home of all that was mellow and groovy" while New York was known for gritty and passionate music noting that for Los Angele's punk scene, "conventional wisdom was off balance, and L.A. was home to some of the very best American punk bands of the day." The music is pulled from the various independent labels from the area, including independent imprints including Dangerhouse, Upsetter and Bomp! Records.

== Release ==
Punk 45: Chaos in the City of Angels and Devils was released by Soul Jazz Records on March 18, 2016 by Soul Jazz Records. It was released on a double vinyl record and compact disc.

== Reception ==
Professional ratings
Review scores
Source	Rating
AllMusic	4/5 stars
PopMatters	(7/10)
Record Collector	4/5 stars

Deming of AllMusic praised the compilation stating that it showed that "Los Angeles was home to some of the very best American punk bands of the day" and that all the tracks on the album are "all clearly winners, and point not only to the quality of the Los Angeles punk movement, but to its diversity early on." Deming noted that the album was not perfect as a Los Angeles Punk sampler as it lacked music by Black Flag and The Screamers and concluded that if "you have a taste for first-era punk from any part of the world, you'll find lots of top-notch pogo action here."

Tim Peacock of Record Collector described the album as a "highly covetable collection" while also noting the absence of Black Flag and that many of the track has already been collected in Domino's Black Hole compilation. An anonymous reviewer for PopMatters noted that " the material presented on this single disc sounds very much of its time and its place and you can feel the smog baking your lungs as you chug down “ABCD” by the Randoms or Agent Orange's "Bloodstains"." while noting some weaker tracks specifically those by the Simpletones.

== Track listing ==
1. The Middle Class – "Out Of Vogue" (1:01)
2. X – "We're Desperate" (2:02)
3. The Flesh Eaters – "Disintegration Nation" (1:53)
4. The Weirdos – "A Life Of Crime" (2:19)
5. The Urinals – "I'm White And Middle Class" (0:54)
6. Iggy And The Stooges – "I Got A Right" (3:19)
7. The Germs – "Forming" (3:04)
8. Agent Orange – "Bloodstains" (1:44)
9. Black Randy & The Metrosquad – "Trouble At The Cup" (1:54)
10. The Urinals – "Ack Ack Ack Ack" (1:00)
11. The Zeros – "Don't Push Me Around" (2:25)
12. The Randoms – "ABCD" (4:06)
13. Circle Jerks – "What's Your Problem" (0:55)
14. The Bags – "Survive" (2:44)
15. Adolescents – "Amoeba" (3:03)
16. The Dils – "Class War" (1:40)
17. The Deadbeats – "Brainless" (2:34)
18. Simpletones – "I Like Drugs" (2:09)
19. T.S.O.L. – "World War III" (1:46)
20. Eyes – "TAQN" (1:59)
21. The Hollywood Squares – "Hollywood Square" (2:59)
22. The Deadbeats – "Final Ride" (3:15)
