= Punk 45: There Is No Such Thing As Society =

Compilation album by Various artists
- Released: January 24, 2014
- Genre: Punk rock, post-punk
- Length: 72:09
- Label: Soul Jazz

Punk 45 chronology
Punk 45: Kill the Hippies! Kill Yourself! (2013)	Punk 45: There Is No Such Thing As Society (2014)	Punk 45: Sick on You! One Way Spit! (2014)

Punk 45: There Is No Such Thing As Society (subtitled: Get A Job, Get A Car, Get A Bed, Get Drunk! Underground Punk in the UK 1977-81, Vol.2) is a 2014 compilation album cataloguing punk and post-punk music from the United Kingdom released between 1977 and 1981. It was released by Soul Jazz Records and received positive reviews from AllMusic, Record Collector and The Times.

== Music and content ==
Punk 45: There Is No Such Thing As Society is a compilation that was a follow-up to Soul Jazz Records' album Punk 45: Underground Punk in the United States of America, Vol. 1 (2013). This album focuses on punk rock and post-punk music released between 1977 and 1981 that was not as popular as other groups of the era such as The Clash and The Sex Pistols.

== Release ==
Punk 45: There Is No Such Thing As Society was released by Soul Jazz Records on January 24, 2014, on vinyl and compact disc. A third album in the Punk 45 series was released in 2014, cataloguing proto-punk music titled Punk 45: Sick on You! One Way Spit!

== Reception ==
Professional ratings
Review scores
Source	Rating
AllMusic	4.5/5 stars
Record Collector	4/5 stars
The Times	4/5 stars

Tim Peacock of Record Collector praised the compilation, calling it "a fine balance between the seminal, the obscure and the downright arcane." and that the album could not compete with the book Punk 45 released by Soul Jazz, "but it’s still nigh-on essential". Aneet Nijar of AllMusic also praised the album, stating that "What makes this compilation so engaging is that the songs evoke images of a '70s Britain behest by strikes, rolling blackouts, Margaret Thatcher, and general disillusionment with the establishment alongside the genuine musical ingenuity and drive of the artists featured. By successfully capturing this spirit of discontent and the subsequent creativity that nurtured it, this collection is a brilliant snapshot of the rise of U.K. punk and post-punk and the explosive cultural shift that followed." Will Hodgkinson of The Times gave the album a four out of five, stating that the album "proves what diamonds in the rough those singles so often were."

== Track listing ==
1. The Users – "Sick of You" (3:24)
2. The Art Attacks – "Neutron Bomb" (2:47)
3. Johnny Moped – "Incendiary" (2:47)
4. The Jermz – "Powercut" (1:48)
5. The Mekons – "32 Weeks" (1:38)
6. The Rings – "I Wanna Be Free" (2:49)
7. The Now – "Development Corporations" (3:09)
8. The Killjoys – "Johnny Won't Get to Heaven" (2:44)
9. Disturbed – "I Don't Believe" (4:25)
10. Television Personalities – "Part Time Punks" (2:38)
11. Puncture – "Mucky Pup" (2:04)
12. The Lines – "White Night" (3:24)
13. The Scabs – "Leave Me Alone" (2:47)
14. The Cravats – "You're Driving Me" (4:51)
15. Swell Maps – "Real Shocks" (2:16)
16. The Nerves – "TV Adverts" (2:46)
17. Eric Random – "23 Skidoo" (3:17)
18. 'O' Level – "East Sheen" (3:01)
19. Josef K – "Radio Drill Time" (4:03)
20. The Cigarettes – "They're Back Again, Here They Come" (3:56)
21. The Shapes – "Wot's For Lunch Mum" (1:30)
22. The Freeze – "For J.P.S." (2:13)
23. Roses are Red – "Can't Understand" (3:05)
24. The Prefects – "Going Through the Motions" (4:56)
