= TV Sound and Image =

Compilation album by Various artists
- Released: July 3, 2012
- Genre: Library music
- Length: 110:04
- Label: Soul Jazz
- Compiler: Stuart Baker, Pete Reilly, Steve Platt

TV Sound and Image, British Television, Film and Library Composers 1956-80 is a 2012 compilation album released by Soul Jazz Records. The album consists of a style of music known as Library music, music developed by production houses with the intent that the recordings would be licensed to various film, television, and radio programs.

== Release ==
TV Sound and Image was released by Soul Jazz Records on July 3, 2012 by Soul Jazz Records. It was released on compact disc and as two separate vinyl releases.

== Reception ==
Professional ratings
Review scores
Source	Rating
AllMusic	4/5 stars
The Irish Times	4/5 stars
New Zealand Herald	5/5 stars

From contemporary reviews, Stephen Thomas Erlewine of AllMusic found the album contained "a fair chunk of the classics from this golden age" with "sometimes perhaps tipping a little too heavily into the recognizable" but declared that it led to the soundtrack being not "only an entertaining nostalgia trip -- either for those who lived through the era or those who have always romanticized it -- but a good introduction to the pleasures of Library Music". Jim Carroll of The Irish Times gave the album a four-star review, noting that the music and themes have "endured long after plotlines or story arcs have been lost in the mists of time." and that how "the set of themes and incidental music is how downright funky some of those breaks were, a fact which has not escaped crate-diggers over the years." The review in the New Zealand Herald proclaimed it as a "inspired, head-nodding, and groove-generating stuff, though it sure owes a debt to Issac Hayes's 1969 classic Hot Buttered Soul." The review concluded that "every track is a killer, and other highlights, apart from Spiral and many of the well-known catchy ones, include Keith Papworth's fun-loving funk and bubbling bass tune Hardhitter and the lounge soul of Bullet's The Contract Man. This is more than just music to mooch too."

== Track listing ==
Track listing adapted from back of album sleeve and liner notes.

No.	Title	Credited Performer	Length
1.	"Condition Red"	Barry Stoller	2:01
2.	"Light Flight"	Pentangle	3:13
3.	"Three Days of The Condor"	Geoff Love and his Orchestra	3:12
4.	"Man Alive"	The Tony Hatch Sound	2:01
5.	"Tomorrow's World"	Richard Denton And Martin Cook	4:10
6.	"At the Sign of the Swingin' Cymbal"	Brian Fahey and his Orchestra	2:05
7.	"The Contract Man"	Bullet	2:27
8.	"Man Friday"	Syd Dale	2:35
9.	"The Laurie Johnson Orchestra Echo Four-Two"	The Laurie Johnson Orchestra	2:12
10.	"Hard Hitter"	Keith Papworth	2:53
11.	"The Persuaders"	John Barry	2:07
12.	"Getting Nowhere In A Hurry"	Roy Budd	3:08
13.	"Dawn to Dusk"	The Simon Park Orchestra	3:07
14.	"Fiesta Numero Uno"	The Marylebone Orchestra	2:15
15.	"Sort of Soul"	Birds 'N Brass	2:47
16.	"The Avengers"	Johnny Gregory And His Orchestra	2:06
17.	"Fragments of Fear"	Johnny Harris	4:07
18.	"Get Carter"	Roy Budd	2:58
19.	"Guide Path"	Neil Richardson	1:43

No.	Title	Credited Performer	Length
1.	"Condition Red"	Brian Bennett	2:34
2.	"Death Line"	Wil Malone	4:11
3.	"Huckleberry Fine"	Syd Dale	3:28
4.	"Spiral"	The Harry Roche Constellation	10:36
5.	"Jungle Fire Dance"	The Ivor And Basil Kirchin Band	2:36
6.	"The New Avengers Theme"	The Laurie Johnson Orchestra	2:21
7.	"Folk Song"	James Clarke	3:10
8.	"Strike Rich"	The Reg Tilsley Orchestra	2:49
9.	"Joe 90"	The Barry Gray Orchestra	1:57
10.	"Soul Thing"	Keith Mansfield	3:15
11.	"Whole Lotta Love"	C.C.S.	3:32
12.	"Artful Dodger"	Syd Dale	2:34
13.	"Jaguar"	John Gregory and his Orchestra	3:37
14.	"Down Home"	Nick Ingman	2:59
15.	"Steam Heat"	Barbara Moore	2:53
16.	"Angels"	Alan Parker	2:58
17.	"Fragments of Fear"	Johnny Harris	4:07
18.	"Face Up"	Alan Moorhouse	2:30
