= Sand (band) =

English band

- Origin: York, England
- Genres: experimental rock; jazz; electronic
- Years active: 1995–2006
- Label: Soul Jazz
- Members: Tim Wright; Hilary Jeffery; John Richards; Neil Griffiths; Rowan Oliver
- Past members: Ben Clark; Yorgos Adamis; Matt Miles
- Website: Soul Jazz Records

Sand was a five-piece experimental rock/jazz/electronic group based in York, England. Formed in 1995, its core members were Tim Wright (electronics, keyboards and vocals), Hilary Jeffery (trombone), John Richards (double and electric bass), Neil Griffiths (guitar and films) and Rowan Oliver (drums/percussion). Sand was originally an offshoot of Tim Wright's Germ project, and members of the band were also involved in the band Scorn. Sand's first performance was at The Spotted Cow in York in June 1995 with drummer Ben Clark. The group should not be confused with the 1970s German band of the same name.

Their early work was dominated by a jazz aesthetic but as a relationship developed with Soul Jazz Records' owner Stuart Baker the sound became more guitar oriented, whilst maintaining an improvisatory approach to recording and performing. This led to three albums on the Soul Jazz Records label. They are: Beautiful People Are Evil (1999), Still Born Alive (2001), and The Dalston Shroud (2006) as well as 12" vinyl EPs. Contributors to the releases included Ben Clark (drums and percussion, Beautiful People Are Evil), Yorgos Adamis (voice, Hello Mrs Apple), Matt Miles (double bass, Beautiful People Are Evil), Maja Solveig Kjelstrup Ratkje, (voice, The Dalston Shroud) and Louie Austen (voice, The Dalston Shroud).

Sand's collaboration with choreographer Saburo Teshigawara resulted in the creation of the piece Green, which has been performed at the New National Theatre, Tokyo (2000, 2002) and the Melbourne International Arts Festival (2005). They have also performed at the Vienna Opera House alongside techno guru Patrick Pulsinger. And in 2005 they created and performed a new soundtrack to the Tarkovsky film Stalker at the ICA as well as toured cinemas with a series of specially commissioned work from video artists.

== Discography ==
- 1999 Beautiful People Are Evil (Soul Jazz Records)
- 2001 Still Born Alive (Soul Jazz Records)
- 2006 The Dalston Shroud (Soul Jazz Records)
