= New Thing! =

Compilation album by Various Artists
- Released: March 2005
- Genre: Jazz
- Label: Soul Jazz
- Compiler: Stuart Baker

New Thing! is a 2005 compilation album of jazz music released by Soul Jazz Records. The album compiles jazz music following social and musical changes in the jazz scene predominantly in the 1970s with artists ranging from Alice Coltrane, Sun Ra and Archie Shepp. Despite its title, the music is not specifically related to a specific group of free jazz musicians sometimes coined as the "new thing". On its release, the album received praise from publications such as AllMusic, Exclaim! and the JazzTimes.

== Music ==
In the album's liner notes, Patrick Coupar described the album's music as exploring a period when musicians "opened their minds to new and previously unexplored worlds of musical and cultural possibilities." with an "emerging appreciation of a range of different musical cultures from around the world" which led to new and unique music. While the term "New Thing" is generally applied to only a particular group of 1960s avant-garde music artists, Coupar stated the album purposely used it as a "broader and more inclusive sense which seems to better encapsulate the spirit in which the term was coined."

== Release and reception ==
Professional ratings
Review scores
Source	Rating
AllMusic	4.5/5 stars
The Independent	4.5/5 stars

New Thing! was released by Soul Jazz Records in March 2005.

From contemporary reviews, Christopher Porter of JazzTimes commented on the label's reputation of releasing reggae, Latin, disco, soul and funk music and declared that New Thing! showcased that "even the noisy avant-garde liked to get down sometimes-on the dance floor and in meditative thought." finding the best track to be Maulawi's "Street Rap" which Porter described as sounding like an outtake from On the Corner. Thom Jurek of AllMusic gave the album a four and a half star rating, declaring it a "a treasure trove of spirited, brave, and deeply emotional music" and concluded that "What's highlighted and put on display here is one of the richest jazz compilations to come out in years and its sequencing is utterly priceless." concluding it as "one of the more essential compilations to come out this year." David Dacks of Exclaim! proclaimed the album as a "TKO itself", but that it was "a great representation of the jazz sensibility for which Soul Jazz is famous, but as with all their jazz collections, their mandate to groove misrepresents the full spectrum of some of the artists compiled. As an introduction and a celebration of these great artists' funkier moments, it's well worth getting."

== Track listing ==
CD 1

1. Maulawi – "Street Rap" (6:11)
2. The Art Ensemble of Chicago – "Funky Aeco" (7:33)
3. Sun Ra – "Angels And Demons At Play" (2:49)
4. Paris Smith – "Pentatonia" (3:06)
5. Travis Biggs – "Tibetian Serenity" (4:06)
6. Rashied Ali & Frank Lowe – "Duo Exchange" (6:10)
7. Archie Shepp – "Money Blues" (9:05)
8. Hannibal Marvin Peterson & Sunrise Orchestra – "Forest Sunrise" (9:30)
9. Amina Claudine Myers – "Have Mercy Upon Us" (11:00)

CD 2

1. Alice Coltrane – "A Love Supreme" (10:44)
2. Lloyd McNeill – "Home Rule" (6:15)
3. East New York Ensemble – "Little Sunflower" (13:20)
4. Robert Rockwell III – "Androids" (7:31)
5. Eddie Gale – "Black Rhythm Happening" (2:50)
6. Stanley Cowell – "El Space-O" (8:15)
7. Steve Davis – "Lalune Blanche" (5:22)

== Credits ==
Credits adapted from the vinyl liner notes.

- Stuart Baker – compiler
- Patrick Coupar – sleeve notes
- Adrian Self – sleeve design
- Fly Cycle-O – sleeve design
- Angela Scott – licensing
- Pete Reilly – mastering
- Duncan Cowell – mastering
