= Peter Giger =

Swiss percussionist and bandleader (born 1939)

- Born: 12 April 1939. Zurich, Switzerland
- Died: 27 May 2026 (aged 87)
- Occupations: percussionist and bandleader

Peter Giger (12 April 1939 – 27 May 2026) was a Swiss percussionist and bandleader, formerly of the German jazz-rock band Dzyan.
