= Can You Dig It? (album) =

Compilation album by Various Artists
- Released: September 29, 2009
- Genre: Funk, soul
- Length: 122:11
- Label: Soul Jazz
- Compiler: Stuart Baker

Can You Dig It? (subtitled: The Music and Politics of Black Action Films 1968-75) is a 2009 compilation album of film music released by Soul Jazz Records. The album consists primarily of funk and soul music that is taken from 1970s blaxploitation films of the 1970s ranging from the films theme songs to instrumental passages.

The album received positive reviews from The Irish Times and Pitchfork on its release, with Pitchfork declaring it among the best reissue albums of the year. More lukewarm reviews came from The Independent who found too much of the album sounding generic.

== Music ==
Can You Dig It? predominantly contains funk and soul music from blaxploitation films of the 1970s with over half the tracks being instrumental. The music provided backing to the films, which Jim Carroll of The Irish Times mostly described as action films that feature pimps, hustlers dealers and pushers who were "one-dimensional in the extreme".

Nate Patrin of Pitchfork noted the variety of themes across the music with socially conscious pieces such as "Freddie's Dead" and "Across 110th Street" while others were just songs for tough lead characters in the films they represent that arose in the wake of the popularity of "Theme from Shaft". Patrin also noted the collection of artists on the album ranged from musicians who were "reaching their peak", jazz musicians who began developing film scores, to other film composers who began adapting their music to the genre, such as Don Costa who prior to writing the theme to The Soul of Nigger Charley, had produced and arranged Frank Sinatra's "My Way".

On developing the 100-page booklet for the album, the author and Soul Jazz Records owner Stuart Baker stated in 2009 "I've been collecting these albums for many years and I'd played them again recently and they sounded quite fresh quite possibly because of the current soul revival" Baker contributed to the music being better as the soul, jazz and funk artists making them had been "given a bigger budget than normal. They had strings sections and orchestras that they wouldn't normally get, hence the songs sound unique" and labels commissioned their best artists to write new songs opposed to using their older music for the films.

== Release and reception ==
Professional ratings
Review scores
Source	Rating
The Irish Times	4/5 stars
Pitchfork	(8.7/10)

Can You Dig It? was released by Soul Jazz Records on September 29, 2009. It was released on compact disc, and two volumes of vinyl records, and digitally in mp3 format. Jim Carroll of The Irish Times awarded the compilation four stars out of five, praising the release's music as well as its content, noting that "along with a 100-page book detailing Blaxploitation’s peaks and troughs [...] [the album] oozes funk from every crevice and pore." Patrin gave the album a high ranking in Pitchfork, including it in their list of "Best New Reissues", calling it an "excellent compilation" noting that "the music survives as strong as ever, renewed through the lens of the hip-hop generation that grew up with and reinterpreted it."

Nick Coleman of The Independent gave the album a mixed review stating that "there is something fundamentally untrivial about a lot of this material, even if it is so generic it sometimes hurts." noting the album contained "30 tracks of varying quality".

== Track listing ==
CD 1

1. Roy Ayers – "Coffy Is the Color" (3:00)
2. Gene Page – "Blacula" (2:39)
3. Johnny Pate – "Shaft in Africa" (3:03)
4. Willie Hutch – "Brother's Gonna Work It Out" (4:45)
5. Don Costa – "The Soul of Nigger Charley" (3:20)
6. Marvin Gaye – ""T" Plays It Cool" (4:26)
7. Bobby Womack – "Across 110th Street" (3:46)
8. J.J. Johnson – "Willie Chase" (3:05)
9. James Brown – "Down and Out in New York City" (4:41)
10. Quincy Jones – "They Call Me MISTER Tibbs" (4:32)
11. Martha Reeves – "Keep On Movin' On" (3:36)
12. Dennis Coffey – "Theme from Black Belt Jones" (2:38)
13. Curtis Mayfield – "Freddie's Dead" (5:25)
14. The Blackbyrds – "Wilford's Gone" (2:20)
15. Willie Hutch – "Theme of Foxy Brown" (2:23)
16. Isaac Hayes – "Run Fay Run" (2:46)

CD 2

1. Isaac Hayes – "Shaft" (4:36)
2. Curtis Mayfield – "Pusherman" (5:01)
3. Joe Simon – "Theme from Cleopatra Jones" (3:43)
4. Johnny Pate – "You Can't Even Walk in the Park" (2:31)
5. Brer Soul & Earth, Wind & Fire – "Sweetback's Theme" (3:23)
6. James Brown – "Make It Good to Yourself" (3:16)
7. Isaac Hayes – "Pursuit of the Pimpmobile" (9:03)
8. Grant Green – "Travelling to Get to Doc" (1:39)
9. Booker T and The MGs – "Time Is Tight" (4:59)
10. Roy Ayers – "Aragon" (2:51)
11. Edwin Star – "Easin' In" (2:57)
12. Gordon Staples – "Strung Out" (4:49)
13. Nate Dove And The Devils – "Zombie March" (3:18)
14. The Impressions – "Make a Resolution" (3:06)
15. Solomon Burke and Gene Page – "The Bus" (2:11)
16. Jack Ashford – "Las Vegas Strut" (2:20)
17. Don Julian – "Lay It on Your Head" (3:31)
18. Galt MacDermot – "Ed and Digger" (2:11)

== Credits ==
Credits adapted from the vinyl liner notes.

- S. Baker – compiler, liner notes
- A. Self – sleeve design
- Guggenheim Bilbao – sleeve design
- Duncan Cowell – mastering
- Pete Reilly – mastering
- Dan Wynn – cover photography
