= Box of Dub =

Compilation album by Various Artists
- Released: May 28, 2007
- Genre: Dubstep
- Length: 62:09
- Label: Soul Jazz

Box of Dub is a 2007 compilation album released by Soul Jazz Records in 2007. It features music of the contemporary dubstep music scene of the period. The album contains exclusive tracks by each artist.

== Release ==
Box of Dub was released on compact disc and three-disc vinyl by Soul Jazz Records on May 28, 2007. The album was followed up with Box of Dub 2: Dubstep and Future Dub.

== Reception ==
Professional ratings
Review scores
Source	Rating
Spin	3.5/5 stars

From contemporary reviews, Matt Earp of XLR8R as containing "half of a dozen of the scenes most successful producers" as well as having "great tracks from a few sideline observers." Earp noted that the tracks by Kode9 and Digital Mystikz were introspective while Burial's track "pulls off brilliant-sounding liquid D&B at dubstep tempo." Earp concluded that the biggest surprise was the tracks that came from outsiders such as Jay Haze and Michal Ho as well as Kevin Martin. Chris Mann of Resident Advisor stated that Box of Dub worked well as an introduction to dubstep, while finding that "the emphasis is on the dub roots of the scene rather than trying to cover all the possible ground. For this reason Digital Mystikz, Haze, Scuba and Skream appear with two tracks, while some of the pioneers and innovators such as Horsepower Productions, Benga and Shackleton are conspicuous by their absence." Killian Fox of The Observer called the album a "superb dubstep selection" declaring it an "essential record for initiates and devotees alike." finding the highlights to be Burial, Kode 9, and Skream. Spin gave the album a three and a half star rating out of five, stating that "dubstep hasn't caught on [in the United States]" while noting that tracks by "Burial, Kode 9 or the almighty Skream through fat speakers at high volume, and they'll melt your sacrum like bikram yoga."

Commenting on the release in 2010, Robin Murray of Clash stated the album "really supplied an expert primer to the youthful bass scene."

== Track listing ==
Track listing adapted from the liner notes.

No.	Title	Writer(s)	Credited Performer	Length
1.	"I Wait"	M. Lawrence	Digital Mystikz	5:18
2.	"The Light"	Jay Haze, Michal Ho	Sub Version featuring Paul St. Hilaire	6:40
3.	"Sub Island"	O. Jones	Skream	4:31
4.	"Dread Cowboy"	Tayo Popoola, Matt Buggins	Tayo Meets Acid Rockers Uptown	5:50
5.	"Subaqueous"	P. Rose	Scuba	5:02
6.	"Magnetic City"	S. Goodman	Kode 9	5:02
7.	"Rise Up"	Haze, Ho	Sub Version featuring Paul St. Hilaire	6:15
8.	"Unite"	Burial	Burial	4:58
9.	"Guilty"	Lawrence	Digital Mystikz featuring Sgt. Pokes	4:48
10.	"Surround Me"	K. Martin, R. Robinson	King Midas Sound	4:31
11.	"Irie"	Jones	Skream	4:15
12.	"Respirator"	Rose	Scuba	4:38
