= Bossa Nova and the Rise of Brazilian Music in the 1960s =

Bossa Nova

Compilation album by Various artists
- Released: 2011
- Genre: Bossa nova
- Length: 92:03
- Label: Soul Jazz
- Compiler: Stuart Baker

Bossa Nova (subtitled: Bossa Nova and the Rise of Brazilian Music in the 1960s) is a 2011 compilation album released by Soul Jazz Records. It was released to positive reviews from The Guardian, The Independent and The Observer.

== Reception ==
Professional ratings
Review scores
| Source | Rating |
|---|---|
| The Guardian | 4/5 stars |

Robin Denselow praised the album, stating that the album "bravely attempts to provide an overview, while leaving out some of the obvious classics." noting the lack of songs like Desafinado or Aguas de Março, let alone "Girl from Ipanema" while artists like Carlos Lyra "doesn't even get a mention." Denselow followed this up stating "No matter, for there's other great music". Nick Coleman of The Independent praised the album as "an exemplary account of how Brazilian music found its keenest popular focus in the 1960s" Neil Spencer of The Observer praised the album as a "dazzling 2CD set" noting its hybrid of artists such as Elis Regina and Jorge Ben with "edgier creations", noting Baden Powell's song "Canto De Ossanha".

== Track listing ==
| No. | Title | Writer(s) | Credited Performer | Length |
|---|---|---|---|---|
| 1. | "Roda" | Gilberto Gil, João Augusta | Elis Regina | 2:35 |
| 2. | "Inverno" | Ronaldo Ferraz, Ugo Marotta | Roberto Menescal | 1:56 |
| 3. | "O Sapo" | João Gilberto | João Gilberto | 1:51 |
| 4. | "Yemanja" | Luiz Roberto, Tuca | Ginga Trio | 2:07 |
| 5. | "Lalari-Olalá" | | Jorge Ben | 2:57 |
| 6. | "Berimbua" | Baden Powell, Vinicius De Moraes | Dorival Caymmi | 2:58 |
| 7. | "Primitivo" | Sérgio Mendes | Sérgio Mendes & Bossa Rio | 3:54 |
| 8. | "Birimbau" | Codo, João Mello | Nara Leão | 2:52 |
| 9. | "Mas Que Nada" | Ben | Tamba Trio | 2:36 |
| 10. | "Canto De Ossanha" | Powell, De Moraes | Baden Powell & Vinicius De Moraes | 3:25 |
| 11. | "Zimbo Samba" | Adilson Godoy | Zimbo Trio | 2:04 |
| 12. | "Viramundo" | J.C. Capinan, Gil | Gilberto Gil | 2:18 |
| 13. | "Menino Das Laranjas" | Theo | Elis Regina | 2:14 |
| 14. | "Jogo De Roda" | Edu Lobo, De Moraes | Edu Lobo | 2:50 |
| 15. | "Vida Bela" | Jobim, De Moraes | Elizete Cardoso | 2:06 |
| 16. | "Jangal" | Orlandivo, Rubens Bassini | Dom Um Romão | 1:59 |
| 17. | "Adriana" | Luiz Fernando Freire, Roberto Menescal | Wanda Sá | 1:59 |
