= Deutsche Elektronische Musik =

Compilation album by Various Artists
- Released: April 5, 2010
- Genre: Krautrock
- Label: Soul Jazz
- Compilers: Adrian Self and Stuart Baker

Deutsche Elektronische Musik chronology
Deutsche Elektronische Musik (2010)	Deutsche Elektronische Musik 2 (2013)

Deutsche Elektronische Musik is a compilation album of German electronic and rock music released in 2010 by Soul Jazz Records.

== Release ==
Deutsche Elektronische Musik was released by Soul Jazz Records on April 5, 2010. A follow-up titled Deutsche Elektronische Musik 2 was released by Soul Jazz in 2013. The album was re-released by Soul Jazz in 2018.

== Reception ==
Professional ratings
Review scores
Source	Rating
AllMusic	4.5/5 stars
The Guardian	5/5 stars
PopMatters	9/10 stars

From contemporary reviews, Dave Simpson of The Guardian gave the album a five-star rating out of five, declaring that it is "a near-definitive guide to some of the world's most extraordinary music". For AllMusic Richie Unterberger described it as including "works by some of the most renowned exponents of [krautrock]" with the exception of Kraftwerk and that the album "yields a good cross-section of a style that was likely more influential in subsequent decades than it was at the time". John Garratt of PopMatters reviewed the album in 2018, commenting on Simpson's comment of the album being "definitive", while stating that they do their "best to distance myself from such superlatives, but I'm not going to go through any writing gymnastics to say that the writer is wrong. This is extraordinary music. To say that it's near-definitive is a matter of hair-splitting. Any way you look at it, it's worth the time, money, and posterity."

== Track listing ==
Track listing adapted from the album's liner notes and sleeve.

Disc 1

No.	Title	Writer(s)	Credited Performer	Length
1.	"A Spectacle"	Holger Czukay, Irmin Schmidt, Jaki Liebezeit, Michael Karoli, Rosko Gee	Can	5:39
2.	"Devotion"	Peter Michael Hamel	Between	3:46
3.	"Dino"	Dieter Moebius, Hans Joachim Roedelius, Michael Rother	Harmonia	3:29
4.	"This Morning"		Gila	5:45
5.	"Rambo Zambo"		Kollectiv	11:39
6.	"La Chasse aux microbes"	Michael Bundt, Peter K. Seiler	Michael Bundt	8:30
7.	"Filmmuzik"	Kurt Mill	E.M.A.K.	3:15
8.	"Morgengruss"	Daniel Fichelscher	Popol Vuh	2:57
9.	"Auf Dem Schwarzen Kanal"	Conrad Schnitzler	Conrad Schnitzler	3:12
10.	"Rheinita"	Klaus Dinger	La Düsseldorf	7:37
11.	"Veterano"	Moebius, Roedelius, Rother	Harmonia	3:55
12.	"It's a Rainy Day, Sunshine Girl"	Gunther Wüsthoff, Hans Joachim Irmler, Jean-Hervé Péron, Rudolf Sosna, Werner "Zappi" Diermaier	Faust	7:26
13.	"Hallo Gallo"		Neu!	10:03

Disc 2

No.	Title	Writer(s)	Credited Performer	Length
1.	"Heisse Lippen"	Roedelius	Cluster	5:39
2.	"High Life"		Ibliss	13:01
3.	"Hasenheide"	Moebius	Dieter Moebius	2:36
4.	"Fly United"	Amon Düül II	Amon Düül II	3:29
5.	"Aguirre 1"	Florian Fricke	Popol Vuh	6:13
6.	"Daydream"	Manuel Göttsching	Ash Ra Tempel	5:22
7.	"No Man's Land"	Christopher Franke, Edgar Froese, Johannes Schmoelling	Tangerine Dream	9:05
8.	"Wie Der Wind Am Ende Einer Strasse"	Chris Karrer, Fichelscher, Falk-Ulrich Rogner, John Weinzierl, Michael Karoli, Lothar Meid	Amon Düül II	5:43
9.	"Geradewohl"	Hans-Joachim Roedelius	Roedelius	3:31
10.	"I Want More"	Czukay, Schmidt, Liebezeit, Karoli, Gilmour	Can	3:30
11.	"Soham"	Deuter	Deuter	4:55
