= Soul Jazz Records =

British record label

- Founder: Stuart Baker
- Distributor: PIAS (UK)
- Genre: Various
- Country of origin: UK
- Location: London, England
- Official website: soundsoftheuniverse.com/sjr

Soul Jazz Records is a British record label based in London. Outside of releasing records, the label also publishes books, occasionally films and performs as a DJ set. The music releases labels from a variety of genres, including reggae, house, hip-hop, punk rock, jazz, funk, bossa nova and soul.

== History ==
Soul Jazz Records was founded by Stuart Baker in 1991. Baker purchased his first record at the age of 10 and prior to starting the label, had his roots selling records at a secondhand record vinyl stall in the Camden Market in the late 1980s.

The label initially worked doing straight reissues of old albums before releasing Nu Yorica!, a double album of classic salsa and Latin funk from the 1970s. Peter Reilly spoke on the labels behalf that Nu Yorica was their first "really successful record" form Soul Jazz noting that "it was more of a kind of cult thing up until then. It opened it up to a lot of people." and that the album sold specifically well in New York.

The reggae releases were praised by important people of the genre, such as Chris Blackwell of Island records who called the It's Dynamite! compilations as the "university of reggae." Radio 1's Gilles Peterson commented that "Soul Jazz put out the best compilations. They've consistently done it, from the Studio One stuff to the free jazz stuff to the acid house compilations. As a reissue label, they're the best." Grant Marshall of Massive Attack stated that one thing he wanted to do when entering the music business was to release Studio One records in England and tried to deal with the Coxsone Dodd of Studio One. Baker managed to talk to Dodd to let him have access to their archives after Dodd had put out rare jazz compilations. Dodd died in 2004 leading to the labels relationship to continue via his daughter Carol and his wife Norma Dodd, who died in 2010. These deaths briefly led to breaks in releasing Studio One related material.

The booklets of Soul Jazz Records album are often written by Baker himself, with Baker explaining that he likes to describe the relationships between music and society, the connections between genres, and the history of the music industry.

Soul Jazz has released album through sublabels. These include Universal Sound, which was described by the Soul Jazz website as both a sister label and a subsidiary label. Soul Jazz described Universal Sound as containing "releases that are slightly more specialist. Mainly artist releases rather than compilations they often follow on from an earlier Soul Jazz Release. Many of these releases come with extensive sleeve notes and original photos." Another was Satellite Records, which was a label home to bands such as Add N to X, Sand, Bell, and Yossarian.

== Discography ==
=== Albums ===
==== Compilations ====
- SJR8 London Jazz Classics
- SJR17 London Jazz Classics 2
- SJR19 Soul Jazz Love Strata-East
- SJR22 Brasil
- SJR26 London Jazz Classics 3
- SJR27 Universal Sounds of America
- SJR29 Nu Yorica!
- SJR34 Faith: A Message From The Spirits
- SJR36 Nu Yorica 2!
- SJR37 Batucada Capoeira
- SJR39 Chicano Power!
- SJR40 100% Dynamite!
- SJR41 200% Dynamite!
- SJR42 Barrio Nuevo
- SJR43 300% Dynamite!
- SJR45 Nu Yorica Roots!
- SJR46 400% Dynamite!
- SJR47 New Orleans Funk
- SJR48 Studio One Rockers
- SJR49 Philadelphia Roots
- SJR50 Studio One Soul
- SJR53 Saturday Night Fish Fry: New Orleans Funk and Soul
- SJR55 500% Dynamite!
- SJR56 Studio One Roots
- SJR57 In the Beginning There Was Rhythm
- SJR58 Studio One DJ's
- SJR66 Hustle! Reggae Disco
- SJR67 Studio One Scorcher
- SJR68 Studio One Story
- SJR72 Miami Sound
- SJR74 Nice Up the Dance
- SJR77 New York Noise
- SJR82 British Hustle
- SJR84 600% Dynamite!
- SJR85 Studio One Ska
- SJR87 Studio One Musik City
- SJR89 Studio One Dub
- SJR93 Chicago Soul
- SJR96 Studio One Classics
- SJR97 Studio One Funk
- SJR98 The Sound of Philadelphia
- SJR100 The Gallery
- SJR102 Studio One Disco Mix
- SJR103 Studio One Disco Mix
- SJR107 Soul Gospel
- SJR110 New Thing!
- SJR111 Acid: Can You Jack?
- SJR112 The Sexual Life of the Savages
- SJR114 Studio One Roots 2
- SJR115 Microsolutions #1
- SJR116 Studio One Lovers
- SJR118 Tropicália: A Brazilian Revolution in Sound
- SJR121 Studio One Women
- SJR125 Big Apple Rappin': The Early Days of Hip-Hop Culture in New York City 1979–1982'
- SJR126 New York Noise Vol. 2
- SJR128 Studio One Soul 2
- SJR129 Soul Gospel Vol. 2
- SJR137 Studio One DJ's 2
- SJR143 Studio One Scorcher 2
- SJR144 Cinco Anos Despue (5 Years On)
- SJR146 Dynamite! Dancehall Style
- SJR147 New York Noise Vol. 3
- SJR148 Studio One Rude Boy
- SJR151 Studio One Groups
- SJR153 Do It Yourself
- SJR154 Studio One Rub-a-dub
- SJR156 Studio One Kings
- SJR158 New York Latin Hustle!
- SJR159 Rumble in the Jungle
- SJR161 Box of Dub — Dubstep and Future Dub
- SJR162 Drums of Cuba — Afro-Cuban Music From the Roots
- SJR164 Brazil 70 – After Tropicalia
- SJR166 Studio One Dub Vol. 2
- SJR168 Studio One Roots Vol. 3
- SJR170 Soul Jazz Records Singles 2006–2007
- SJR171 Jamaica Funk — Original Jamaican Soul and Funk 45's
- SJR172 Box of Dub 2 – Dubstep and Future Dub
- SJR177 An England Story
- SJR178 Steppas' Delight — Dubstep Present to Future
- SJR185 New Orleans Funk Vol.2
- SJR194 Soul Jazz Records Singles 2008–2009
- SJR196 Dancehall — The Rise of Jamaican Dancehall Culture
- SJR201 Dub Echoes
- SJR202 Subway – Subway II
- SJR204 100% Dynamite! NYC: Dancehall Reggae Meets Rap In New York City
- SJR206 Fly Girls
- SJR213 Deutsche Elektronische Musik
- SJR214 Can You Dig It? The Music And Politics Of Black Action Films 1968–75
- SJR219 Freedom, Rhythm & Sound – Revolutionary Jazz & The Civil Rights Movement 1963–82
- SJR222 Steppas' Delight 2
- SJR223 Dancehall 2 (The Rise Of Jamaican Dancehall Culture)
- SJR226 135 Grand Street New York 1979
- SJR229 Riddim Box – Excursions In The UK Funky Underground
- SJR230 Rara In Haiti
- SJR234 Future Bass
- SJR236 Invasion Of The Mysteron Killer Sounds
- SJR239 Bossa Nova And The Rise Of Brazilian Music In The 1960s
- SJR242 Brazil Bossa Beat ! Bossa Nova And The Story Of Elenco Records, Brazil
- SJR243 Delta Swamp Rock – Sounds From The South
- SJR244 The Black Caribs Of Belize
- SJR245 Bossa Jazz: The Birth Of Hard Bossa, Samba Jazz And The Evolution Of Brazilian Fusion 1962–73
- SJR248 The Legendary Studio One Records
- SJR253 Harmony, Melody & Style – Lovers Rock In The UK 1975–1992
- SJR254 Jende Ri Palenge – People Of Palenque
- SJR255 Voguing And The House Ballroom Scene Of New York City 1976–96
- SJR256 Studio One Sound
- SJR257 TV Sound And Image (British Television, Film And Library Composers 1956–80)
- SJR258 Country Soul Sisters
- SJR259 Delta Swamp Rock Volume 2 – More Sounds From The South
- SJR260 Studio One Ironsides
- SJR263 Mirror To The Soul: Caribbean Jump-Up, Mambo & Calypso Beat 1954–77
- SJR265 Deutsche Elektronische Musik 2
- SJR266 Acid – Mysterons Invade The Jackin' Zone
- SJR267 Country Soul Sisters Vol.2
- SJR268 New Orleans Funk Vol.3
- SJR269 New Orleans Soul
- SJR270 Inner City Beat! – Detective Themes, Spy Music And Imaginary Thrillers
- SJR271 Studio One Ska Fever! More Ska Sounds From Sir Coxsone's Downbeat 1962–65
- SJR272 Punk 45: Kill The Hippies! Kill Yourself! The American Nation Destroys Its Young, Vol. 1
- SJR274 Calypso: Musical Poetry In The Caribbean 1955–69
- SJR275 Gipsy Rhumba
- SJR277 Studio One Rocksteady
- SJR278 Punk 45: There Is No Such Thing As Society. Get a Job, Get a Car, Get a Bed, Get Drunk!, Vol. 2
- SJR279 Punk 45: Sick On You! One Way Spit! After the Love & Before the Revolution, Vol. 3
- SJR281 Studio One Dancehall – Sir Coxsone in the Dance: The Foundation Sound
- SJR286 No Seattle: Forgotten Sounds of the North-West Grunge Era 1986–97
- SJR287 Gwo Ka: Music of Guadeloupe, West Indies
- SJR288 Black Fire! New Spirits: Radical And Revolutionary Jazz In The U.S.A 1957–82
- SJR289 Disco: A Fine Selection of Independent Disco, Modern Soul and Boogie 1978–82
- SJR290 Degrees of Shade: Hot Jump-Up Island Sounds from the Caribbean
- SJR296 Studio One Jump-Up
- SJR299 Punk 45: Burn, Rubber City, Burn – Akron, Ohio: Punk and the Decline of the Mid-West 1975–80
- SJR300 Punk 45: Extermination Nights In The Sixth City! Cleveland, Ohio: Punk And The Decline Of The Mid West 1975 – 82
- SJR307 Sounds of the Universe: Art + Sound 2012–15, Vol. 1
- SJR309 Nu Yorica! (Reissue, Remastered)
- SJR311 Disco 2: A Further Fine Selection of Independent Disco, Modern Soul and Boogie 1976–80
- SJR312 Rastafari: The Dreads Enter Babylon 1955–83
- SJR321 100% Dynamite! (Reissue)
- SJR323 Coxsone's Music: The First Recordings Of Sir Coxsone The Downbeat 1960–62
- SJR324 Studio One Dub Fire Special
- SJR326 Studio One Showcase: The Sound Of Studio One In The 1970s
- SJR327 New Orleans Funk
- SJR328 New York Noise (Reissue)
- SJR329 Punk 45: Chaos In The City Of Angels And Devils – Punk In Los Angeles 1977–81
- SJR332 Coxsone's Music 2: The Sound Of Young Jamaica
- SJR334 Boombox 1: Early Independent Hip Hop, Electro, And Disco Rap 1979–82
- SJR335 Venezuela 70 – Cosmic Visions Of A Latin American Earth
- SJR341 Nigeria Freedom Sounds!
- SJR344 Nigeria Soul Fever
- SJR354 Punk 45: Les Punks – The French Connection
- SJR355 New Orleans Funk Vol.4
- SJR367 Studio One Rocksteady Vol.2
- SJR368 Hustle! Reggae Disco (Reissue, Expanded)
- SJR370 Boombox 2: Early Independent Hip Hop, Electro, And Disco Rap 1979–82
- SJR371 Vodou Drums In Haiti 2
- SJR377 Studio One Hi-Fi Special
- SJR378 Soul 70
- SJR 379 Nigeria Soul Power 70
- SJR392 Space, Energy & Light – Experimental Electronic And Acoustic Soundscapes 1961–88
- SJR393 Soul Of A Nation: Afro-Centric Visions in the Age of Black Power
- SJR396 Studio One Supreme: Maximum 70s & 80s Early Dancehall Sounds
- SJR398 Black Man's Pride
- SJR399 Yoruba! – Songs & Rhythms For The Yoruba Gods In Nigeria
- SJR401 Dancehall (2017 Edition Reissue): The Rise Of Jamaican Dancehall Culture
- SJR402 Deutsche Elektronische Musik 3
- SJR405 Brasil (Reissue, Remastered)
- SJR406 Studio One Records Dub Plate Special Box Set
- SJR407 Congo Revolution: African Latin, Jazz And Funk Sounds From The Two Congos (1957–73)
- SJR408 Punk 45: Approaching The Minimal With Spray Guns
- SJR409 Deutsche Elektronische Musik (2018 Edition Reissue)
- SJR411 Boombox 3: Early Independent Hip Hop, Electro, And Disco Rap 1979–83
- SJR414 Black Man's Pride 2 (Righteous Are The Sons And Daughters Of Jah)
- SJR415 Studio One Freedom Sounds (Studio One In The 1960s)
- SJR419 Venezuela 70 Volume 2 (Cosmic Visions Of A Latin American Earth: Venezuelan Experimental Rock In The 1970's & Beyond)
- SJR421 Black Man's Pride 3 (None Shall Escape The Judgement Of The Almighty)
- SJR422 Studio One Lovers Rock
- SJR423 Soul Of A Nation 2 (Jazz Is The Teacher Funk Is The Preacher: Afro-Centric Jazz, Street Funk And The Roots Of Rap In The Black Power Era 1969–75)
- SJR424 Black Man's Pride 2
- SJR428 Brazil USA 70 (Brazilian Music In The USA In The 1970s)
- SJR437 Congo Revolution (Revolutionary And Evolutionary Sounds From The Two Congos 1955–62)
- SJR438 Studio One Showcase 45
- SJR439 Boombox 45 (Early Independent Hip Hop, Electro And Disco Rap 1979–82)
- SJR440 APALA: Apala Groups In Nigeria 1967–70
- SJR443 Style & Fashion (A-Class Top Notch Hi Fi Sounds In Fine Style)
- SJR445 Studio One DJ Party
- SJR446 Nigeria Soul Power 70 (Afro-Funk ★ Afro-Rock ★ Afro-Disco)
- SJR449 Space Funk (Afro Futurist Electro Funk In Space 1976–84)
- SJR450 Studio One 007 – Licensed To Ska
- SJR452 Black Riot (Early Jungle, Rave And Hardcore)
- SJR454 Brazil Funk Power
- SJR455 Kaleidoscope (New Spirits Known & Unknown)
- SJR461 Cuba Music And Revolution Experiments In Latin Music 1975–85 Vol.1
- SJR462 Two Synths A Guitar (And) A Drum Machine
- SJR464 Rocksteady Got Soul
- Junglist! Old Skool Ragga, D&B, Jungle 1993–95

==== Re-releases ====
- SJR20 Jessica Lauren – Siren Song
- SJR23 Esperanto – Esperanto
- SJR32 Chris Bowden – Time Capsule
- SJR38 Grupo Oba-Ilu – Santeria
- SJR52 Osunlade – Paradigm
- SJR59 Sandoz – Chant To Jah
- SJR60 A Certain Ratio – Early
- SJR62 Mantronix – That's My Beat
- SJR64 ESG – Step Off
- SJR65 A Certain Ratio – B-Sides, Sessions & Rarities
- SJR76 Joe Gibbs – Joe Gibbs Productions
- SJR80 Jackie Mittoo and The Soul Brothers – Last Train To Skaville
- SJR83 Arthur Russell – The World of Arthur Russell
- SJR88 Hu Vibrational – Beautiful
- SJR90 Konk – The Story of Konk
- SJR91 Ammon Contact – Beat Tape Remixes
- SJR94 Bell – Seven Types of Six
- SJR101 Burning Spear – Sounds from the Burning Spear
- SJR104 Sugar Minott – Sugar Minott at Studio One
- SJR113 Mark Stewart – Kiss the Future
- SJR117 Mercenárias – The Beginning of the End of the World
- SJR120 Tom Moulton – A Tom Moulton Mix
- SJR122 Steve Reid Ensemble – Spirit Walk
- SJR105 Spirits of Life – Haitian Vodou
- SJR127 Sound Dimension – Jamaica Soul Shake Vol. 1
- SJR130 Sandoz – Live in the Earth
- SJR132 Rekid – Made in Menorca
- SJR133 The Sisters Love – Give Me Your Love
- SJR136 Tumba Francesa – Afro-Cuban Music from the Roots
- SJR138 ESG – Keep On Moving
- SJR139 Hu Vibrational – Universal Mother
- SJR140 Sand – The Dalston Shroud
- SJR150 ESG – Come Away With...
- SJR167 ESG – A South Bronx Story 2 – Collector's Edition: Rarities
- SJR173 Sound Dimension – Mojo Rocksteady Beat
- SJR186 Tetine – LET YOUR X'S BE Y'S
- SJR188 Secondo – A Matter of Scale
- SJR190 Ragga Twins – Ragga Twins Step Out
- SJR191 Art Ensemble Of Chicago – Les Stances A Sophie – A Motion Picture Soundtrack
- SJR246 The Lijadu Sisters – Afro-beat Soul Sisters
- SJR302 Popol Vuh – Kailash
- SJR322 Hieroglyphic Being – The Acid Documents
- SJR325 Count Ossie & The Mystic Revelation Of Rastafari – Tales of Mozambique
- SJR331 Count Ossie & The Rasta Family – Man From Higher Heights
- SJR333 Africans With Mainframes (Hieroglyphic Being & Noleian Reusse) – K.M.T.
- SJR345 Betty Harris – The Lost Queen Of New Orleans Soul
- SJR346 Tee Mac – Night Illusion
- SJR369 Laraaji – Celestial Vibration (Reissue)
- SJR373 Lloyd McNeill Quartet – Asha (Reissue)
- SJR374 Lloyd McNeill Quartet – Washington Suite
- SJR375 The Skatalites – Independence Ska And The Far East Sound
- SJR394 Hierogyphic Being – The Red Notes
- SJR412 Nigeria Fuji Machine – Synchro Sound System & Power
