= Seven Types of Six =

Studio album by Bell
- Released: 7 June 2004
- Genre: Electro
- Length: 55:44
- Label: Soul Jazz Records
- Producer: Bell

Bell chronology
Numbers (2000)	Seven Types of Six (2004)

Seven Types of Six is the second studio album by British electro duo Bell, released by Soul Jazz Records on 7 June 2004. It was recorded over a four-year period after their first album, Numbers. The album is described as having interest from Andy Weatherall and Carl Craig.

== Reception ==
Professional ratings
Review scores
Source	Rating
Allmusic	3.5/5 stars

Andy Kellman of AllMusic described Seven Types of Six as "Enough to keep the attention of any IDM head, but [having] a definite emphasis on the dancefloor".

== Track listing ==
All tracks are written by Bell

No.	Title	Length
1.	"File One"	5:06
2.	"Rist IIa4"	4:03
3.	"Rhythm Machine"	6:41
4.	"Daylight Burn"	4:41
5.	"Slide Out Wide"	4:29
6.	"Winning Signal"	3:38
7.	"Mode 3"	4:55
8.	"Black Helicopters"	5:11
9.	"Two Voices"	4:38
10.	"N"	4:35
11.	"Kathy"	3:48
12.	"Mazar"	3:59
Total length:		55:44
