= Vitabeats =

Australian music duo

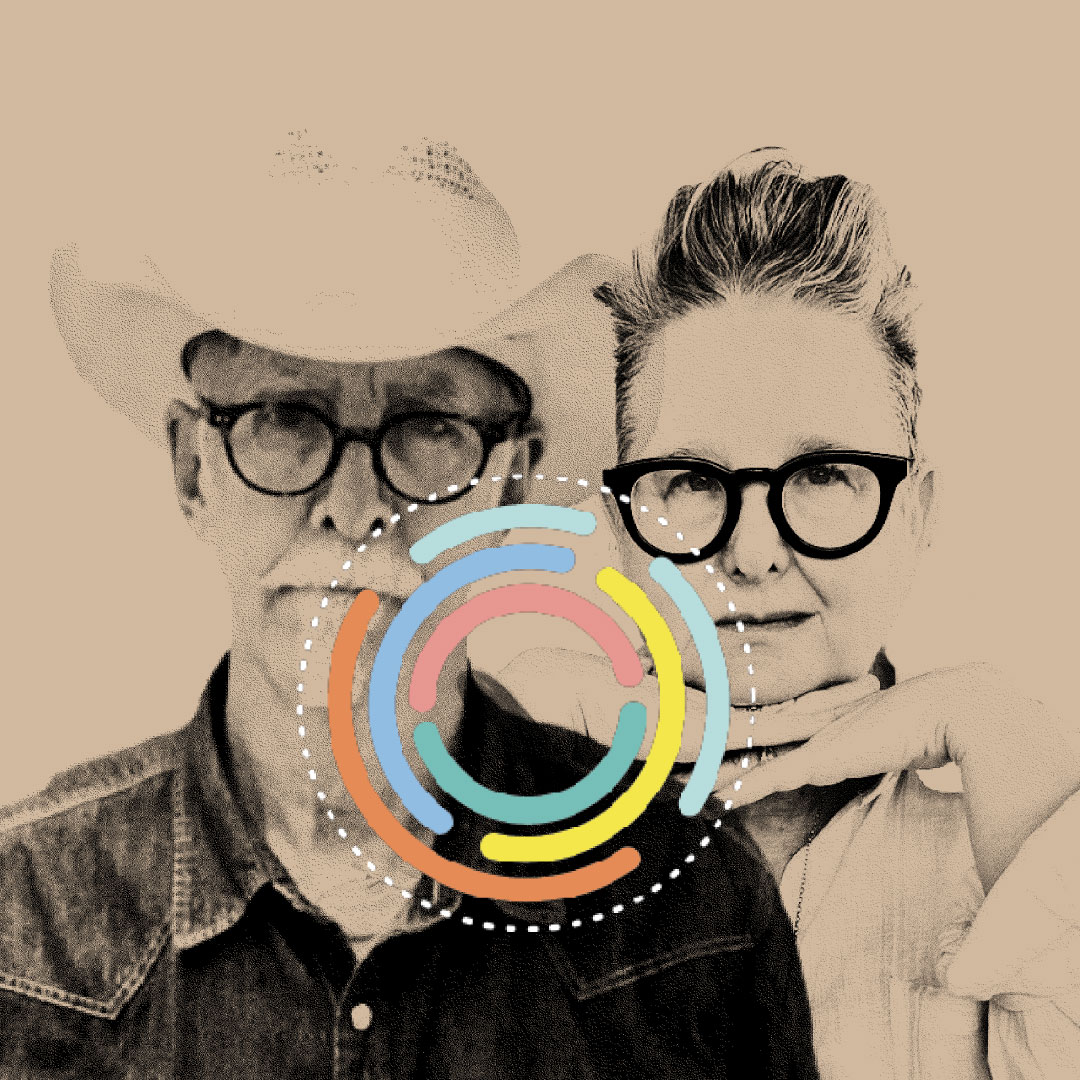
- Andrew & Lissa Vitabeats

Background information
- Origin: Australia
- Genres: Pop music
- Occupations: Designers, Artists, Educators
- Years active: 1982-Present
- Labels: Red; Hot; Foghorn
- Website: https://www.vitabeats.com

Vitabeats are an Australian musical duo, consisting of husband and wife Andrew and Lissa Barnum. Originally signed to Red Records (Festival - Mark Moffatt), the duo recorded an EP and released "Tough Guy", which did not make the Australian top 100. The EP "Cake Mix" was released in July 1985, following the commercial success of "Boom Box".

In 1984, Vitabeats signed with Hot Records and released "Boom Box" in February 1985, this was followed by "Audrey" in July 1985 and a studio album. Both albums were produced by John Bee at Studio 301 Sydney, with additional production by Kenny Francis.

In 1986 Vitabeats performed with The Rock Party, a charity project initiated by The National Campaign Against Drug Abuse, which included many Australasian musicians.

In the 1990s Vitabeats recorded 3 songs with producer Joe Wissert at Trackdown and Studio 301 with engineer David Hemmings. The songs "Mean True Love" and "One world rhythm" were released via streaming in 2013. The B-sides "Mean True Love" and "Flowers in the Wilderness" were recorded by Boris Hunt.

Andrew Barnum (as solo singer-songwriter) has released 5 albums via streaming (and physical cd) recorded with Boris Hunt, released by Foghrorn Records distributed by MGM: "The Perfect Blend: Southerly" (2006), "Feed the Clouds" (2010), "Memory Collective" (2015), "Little Phoenix / City / Country" (2018), "Dear Ancestor" (2020).

== Discography ==
=== Studio albums ===
Title	Album details
Spot the Spanner	Released: late 1985; Format: LP, Cassette; Label: Hot Records (HTLP-1016)

=== Extended plays ===
Title	Album details
The Beats Before the Boom	Released: July 1985; Format: LP, Cassette; Label: Red Records (X 14185)

=== Singles ===
List of singles, with Australian chart positions
Year	Title	Peak chart positions	Album
Year	Title	AUS	Album
1983	"Tough Guy"	-	The Beats Before the Boom
1984	"Cake Mix"	-	non album single
1985	"Boombox"	31	Spot the Spanner
1985	"Audrey"	81	Spot the Spanner
1985	"Difficult Ideas"	-	Spot the Spanner
