= Punk 45: Extermination Nights in the Sixth City =

Compilation album by Various artists
- Released: February 10, 2015
- Genre: Cleveland punk
- Length: 44:05
- Label: Soul Jazz

Punk 45 chronology
Punk 45: Burn, Rubber City, Burn! (2015)	Punk 45: Extermination Nights in the Sixth City (2015)	Punk 45: Chaos in the City of Angels and Devils (2016)

Punk 45: Extermination Nights in the Sixth City (subtitled: Cleveland, Ohio: Punk and the Decline of the Mid-West, 1975-1982) is a 2015 compilation album released by Soul Jazz Records. The album received positive reviews from The Quietus, AllMusic, and Pitchfork.

== Release ==
Punk 45: Extermination Nights in the Sixth City was released by Soul Jazz Records on vinyl and compact disc on February 5, 2015. The album was released on the same day as another release in the series titled: Punk 45: Burn Rubber City, Burn! about bands from Akron, Ohio. The album was followed up by Punk 45: Chaos in the City of Angels and Devils released in 2016.

== Reception ==
Professional ratings
Review scores
Source	Rating
AllMusic	4/5 stars
Pitchfork	(8.0/10)

Mark Deming of AllMusic praised the album, opining that Cleveland, Ohio " somehow produced some of the most exciting, intelligent, and forward-thinking music of the '70s" and "bands like Pere Ubu, the Electric Eels, X-X, and the Pagans were making music that upended the accepted tenets of rock & roll, often in ways the bands playing at CBGB in New York did not." Deming noted that the two Pere Ubu tracks were the "most accomplished performances on the set, ambitious in aim and striking in execution". Deming also commented on Jon Savage's liner notes stating that while they were "excellent" they managed to "recycle plenty of quotes from his essential punk history England's Dreaming." Deming concluded that "this collection could have been a lot longer and featured more material from these bands, but despite that, Extermination Nights in the Sixth City - Cleveland, Ohio: Punk and the Decline of the Mid-West is an excellent introduction to a remarkable musical legacy from an unexpected place."

Reviewing both of the Ohio compilations, Jason Heller of Pitchfork fount the Cleveland compilation superior, stating "The Electric Eels, trafficking in punk savagery on "Splittery Splat" and avant-rock deconstruction on "Bunnies". The Mirrors' jangling, atmospheric "Hands in my Pockets" parallels Television's dreamy vistas as well as England's Swell Maps; Poli Styrene Jass Band's twisted "Drano in Your Veins" is a fit of Syd Barrett-meets-Frank Zappa whimsy. These quirks help make for a more solid, consistent listen than Burn Rubber City, Burn!—a higher batting average aided by the fact that Pere Ubu's tracks here reflect some of the best and most important music the group ever created, while Devo's contributions to Burn Rubber City, Burn! amount to mere marginalia."

== Track listing ==
1. Pagans – "Street Where Nobody Lives" (1:36)
2. Jazz Destroyers – "Love Meant To Die" (1:35)
3. Pere Ubu – "Final Solution" (4:57)
4. The Broncs – "Tele-K-Killing" (1:06)
5. Electric eels – "Splittery Splat" (2:15)
6. Pagans – "Dead End America" (1:40)
7. x_x – "Approaching The Minimal With Spray Guns" (1:35)
8. The Defnics – "51%" (2:23)
9. Pere Ubu – "Heart Of Darkness" (4:43)
10. The Human Switchboard – "No!" (1:40)
11. x_x – "A" (2:49)
12. Pressler, Morgan – "You're Gonna Watch Me" (1:39)
13. Pagans – "I Juvenile" (1:53)
14. Poli Styrene Jazz Band – "Drano In Your Veins" (1:46)
15. The Mirrors – "Hands In My Pockets" (2:14)
16. electric eels – "Bunnies" (4:52)
17. Styrene Money – "Everything Near Me" (1:22)
18. Rocket from the Tombs – "Life Stinks" (3:26)
