= Geiom =

British DJ

Geiom, a.k.a. Hem (born Kamal Joory) is a Nottingham based producer, live electronic musician and DJ. He is also the owner of the Berkane Sol label. He was known for being part of a group of producers along with 2562 and Shackleton who blended techno, garage and dubstep.

== Early career ==
Geiom was first motivated to start making music by the early 1990s UK rave scene. His first release was a 12" on the Meir label in 1995. Meir is now the name of his studio. He went on to release music on labels such as Skam Records and Neo Ouija Geiom's music makes frequent use of live instrumentation; an early example of this is the 'Magic Radios' album which was a collaboration with instrumentalist Morgan Caney.

Geiom has also released experimental music under the name of Hem. His musical influences are said to include electro, film soundtracks, dub reggae and Indian music.

He co-promoted the influential Deselect events for several years, which featured artists such as Autechre, Plaid, Isan and Kid 606.

== Current work ==
After his first encounters with dubstep in 2004, Geiom started to incorporate the style into his productions, leading to Kode 9 including the track 'Overnight Biscuits' on his 2006 'Dubstep Allstars 3' mix CD, released by the Tempa label.

Geiom started the Berkane Sol record label in 2006 mainly to release his own productions. The label has since seen contributions from Skream, Shackleton, Kode 9, Brackles, Shortstuff, Spamchop, Earlybird, Bowly, Aleks Zen & Erra. Geiom has frequently made use of the profile of the label to showcase new or undiscovered talent. Several artists have launched their careers through a release on Berkane Sol.

Geiom is notable for his frequent collaborations with guest vocalists. The songs "Zalim maar daala" and "Pheli nazir" feature singing in Urdu language by vocalist Khalid. These songs are heavily influenced by Indian film soundtracks.
