= Mark Frazier =

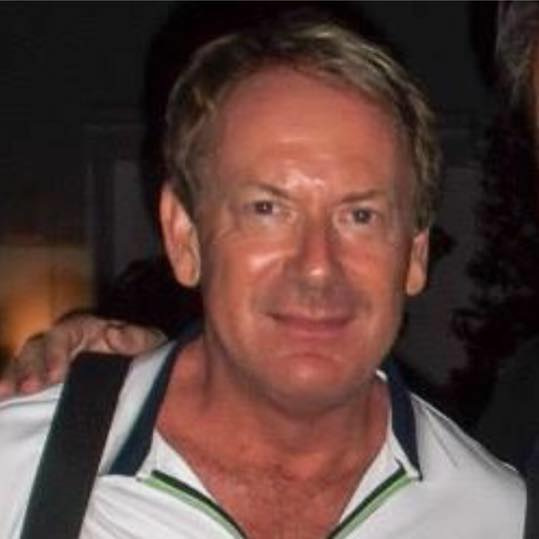
- Born: December 1, 1956 (age 69)
- Occupation: Artist
- Years active: 1980 - present
- Known for: Fine Art Paintings, Body Painting and Photography
- Website: https://www.facebook.com/fraziersart

Mark Frazier is an American born artist, painter, body painter and photographer. His work has been seen in film, television, private collections and print.

== Early life ==
Mark Frazier was born in West Covina, California on December 1, 1956 to Ralph and Doris Frazier. His father worked during the school year as a biology teacher and spent summers as a national park ranger taking the family to parks all over the western United States. His mother was an accomplished artist introducing him to the works of many California plein air painters and the late expressionist painter, LeRoy Neiman.

He attended Claremont McKenna College majoring in biochemistry but soon found his true passion in fine arts and eventually completed his studies at Cal Poly Pomona University. The works of Neiman and Roger Dean inspired Mark to change path and pursue a career in the Arts.

== Career ==
Starting in the early 1980s Mark became known around Los Angeles and New York for painting photo realistic backgrounds for photography studios. This led to the chance encounter with the staff at Playboy Studio West and eventually Hugh Hefner where he was asked to figure out how to bodypaint realistic lingerie onto live models for Hef's exclusive events at the Playboy Mansion.

Mark Frazier officially began his body painting career in 1987. He has worked as the bodypainter at every Playboy Party at the Playboy Mansion since the mid 1990s.

His paintings, body paintings and photographs have been seen in on multiple TV networks, including A&E, NBC, Showtime, CBS, HBO as well as magazines such as Cosmopolitan , Playboy, and TV shows The Girls Next Door, and Badger Airbrush.

Mark worked for years with legendary photographers Stephen Wayda of Playboy and the inventive Jack Eadon developing his own style and techniques of photography. After doing work for Hugh Hefner's personal collection which included paintings and photographs, Hef (who had only trusted film cameras up to this point) selected him to do the first digital photography for Playboy magazine shooting the October 2001 issue of the magazine and then many featured pictorials. Hef's nickname for Mark "the Wizard" stuck around the Playboy organization and in turn The Hollywood crowd.

In 2007 Mark was listed as No. 46 in the Time Magazine Alt Most Influential People in the World List for his hand in creating the modern style and techniques in bodypainting and digital photography.

He is credited with discovering several well known personalities including reality TV star Kendra Wilkinson, and helping guide Madonna's transition from The Breakfast Club to Emmy in the band Emmy and the Emmys and then her solo career.

== Personal life ==
Mark is married to Susan Frazier. They have two grown children, designer Michael Frazier and psychologist Dr. Megan Frazier.
