= Tropicália: A Brazilian Revolution in Sound =

Compilation album by Various Artists
- Released: February 13, 2006
- Genre: Tropicália
- Language: Portuguese
- Label: Soul Jazz
- Compiler: Stuart Baker

Tropicália: A Brazilian Revolution in Sound is a 2006 compilation album released by Soul Jazz Records.

== Release ==
Tropicália: A Brazilian Revolution in Sound was initially set for release in 2005, the album was pushed to February 13, 2006, to tie in with a Tropicalia festival at the Barbican in London. The festival had nearly every artist featured on the compilation. The album was re-released in 2010.

== Reception ==
Professional ratings
Aggregate scores
Source	Rating
Metacritic	93/100
Review scores
Source	Rating
Robert Christgau	A−
Entertainment Weekly	A
The Guardian	4/5 stars
Pitchfork Media	(9.5/10)
The Province	A

At Metacritic, which assigns a normalised rating out of 100 to reviews from mainstream critics, the album has received an average score of 93, indicating universal acclaim, based on 10 reviews. Richard Williams of The Guardian" commented that the artists on the album "brim with youthful inventiveness, blending funk grooves, Brazilian energy, a restrained hint of primitive Haight-Ashbury psychedelics, a sense of humour that transcends linguistic boundaries and a Beatlesque sense of limitless possibilities expressed in the use of orchestral resources alongside the usual beat-group or samba-combo instrumentation." Joe Tangari declared that the compilation takes "an extremely focused look at six of the most important and influential Tropicália artists, [...] responsible for some of the most bracing records Brazil ever produced-- and though omissions are certain to be an issue for cratedigging obsessives, this collection is as flawless a primer as has ever been made available on a single disc."

== Track listing ==
Track listing adapted from the liner notes.

No.	Title	Writer(s)	Credited Performer	Length
1.	"Bat Macumba"	Caetano Veloso, Gilberto Gil	Gilberto Gil
2.	"A Minha Menina"	Jorge Ben	Os Mutantes
3.	"Tuareg"	Ben	Gal Costa
4.	"Domingo No Parque"	Gil	Gilberto Gil & Os Mutantes
5.	"Alfômega"	Gil	Caetano Veloso
6.	"Sebastiana"		Gal Costa
7.	"Procissão"	Gil	Gilberto Gil
8.	"Irene"	Veloso	Caetano Veloso
9.	"Ave Genghis Khan"	Rita Lee, Arnaldo Baptista, Sérgio Dias	Os Mutantes
10.	"Take It Easy, My Brother Charles"	Ben	Jorge Ben
11.	"Jimmy, Renda-Se"	Tom Zé, Waldez	Tom Zé
12.	"Ando Meio Desligado"	Lee, Dias, Batistsa	Os Mutantes
13.	"Tropicália"	Veloso	Caetano Veloso
14.	"Quero Sambal Meu Bem"		Tom Zé
15.	"Vou Recomeçar"		Gal Costa
16.	"Panis et Circenses"	Gil, Veloso	Os Mutantes
17.	"Gloria"		Tom Zé
18.	"Quem Tem Medo De Brincar De Amor"	Baptista, Lee	Os Mutantes
19.	"Lost in the Paradise"	Veloso	Caetano Veloso
20.	"Bat Macumba"	Veloso, Gil	Os Mutantes

== Credits ==
Credits adapted from the vinyl liner notes.

- Stuart Baker – compiler, sleeve notes
- Adrian Self – sleeve designer
- Toothé Grim – sleeve designer
- Pete Reilly – mastering
- Duncan Cowell – mastering
