= Boombox – Early Independent Hip Hop, Electro and Disco Rap 1979–82 =

Compilation album by various artists
- Released: 3 June 2016
- Genres: Hip hop, electro
- Label: Soul Jazz

Boombox – Early Independent Hip Hop, Electro and Disco Rap 1979–82 is a 2016 compilation album released by Soul Jazz Records.

== Content ==
Boombox – Early Independent Hip Hop, Electro and Disco Rap 1979–82 is a 17-track compilation album which focuses on relatively unknown tracks and artists. The CD version of the album contained a 40-page booklet, photography and original album artwork for these releases. The release contains liner notes from Stuart Baker. Baker's notes focus less on individual tracks, instead going into greater detail about the genre's more significant important elements of the era, such as how most rap artists were featured live bands instead of sampling.

== Release ==
Boombox – Early Independent Hip Hop, Electro and Disco Rap 1979–82 was released on 3 June 2016 by Soul Jazz Records on vinyl, compact disc and as a digital download.

== Reception ==
The Irish Times gave the album a positive review, praising the music as "still packs quite a punch" and that the album photos were "just as fascinating", describing it as an era long consigned to books, film and television.

PopMatters noted that "things do start to feel a bit repetitious after awhile (especially across two whole discs), there are still genuine great takeaways to be found, whether it be Sweet G's next-level boasting on "Boogie Feelin' Rap" ("I'm the Clark Gable of the turn tables") to the fantastic female guest spot on Bon-Rock & The Rhythm Rebellion's "Searching Rap" to the downright silly "Cop Bop" by Portable Patrol, which avoids the common traps of playful boasting and party-rapping by tying everything to a silly narrative about "the Disco Cop" (who came here to bop)."

Fact later stated the release was one of Soul Jazz's "best releases in 2016" and as one of their best "sets in ages, a legitimate party in a box, overflowing with underground deep cuts that have seldom — if ever — been spotted on other collections."
