= Dzyan (band) =

German band

- Origin: Mannheim, Baden-Württemberg, Germany
- Genres: Jazz rock, Krautrock, progressive rock, space rock
- Years active: 1971–1974
- Labels: Aronda-Schallplatten, Rock-Fever Music, Bacillus, Compañía Fonográfica Española, Long Hair Music
- Past members: Reinhard Karwatky; Jochen Leuschner; Gerd Bock-Ehrmann; Harry Krämer; Ludwig Braum; Eddy Marron; Lothar Scharf; Peter Giger

Dzyan was a German jazz rock band. The band in its final form comprised Eddy Marron (guitar) Reinhard Karwatky (bass), and percussionist Peter Giger.

The original line-up consisted of guitarist Harry Krämer, singer Jochen Leuschner, drummer Ludwig Braum, bassist Reinhard Karwatky and Gerd Ehrmann on saxophone. As a quintet, the band recorded an album under the same name; However, Braum and Krämer left the band before the album's release.[1] With Lothar Scharf on drums, replacing Volker Kriegel, and guitarist Eddy Marron, coming from the band Vita Nova, the quintet developed a more jazz rock sound in the second half of 1972; they performed at the Pop Shop of the then Südwestfunk (when the radio recording "Mandala", released in 2010, was created). After a brief hiatus, bassist Reinhard Karwartky then re-formed the band in 1973 with Eddy Marron and Peter Giger on drums; Dzyan released two more albums as a trio, which received critical acclaim. On the occasion of the release of the last record "Electric Silence", Jazz Podium said in 1974 that with the album Dzyan would distinguish themselves as “probably the best German band” in the jazz rock sector.

== Discography ==
- Dzyan (1972)
- Time Machine (1973)
- Electric Silence (1974)
- Mandala (SWF-Session 1972) (2010)
