= Nu Yorica! =

Compilation album by Various artists
- Released: February 1996
- Length: 109:17
- Label: Soul Jazz
- Compiler: Stuart Baker

Nu Yorica! – Culture Clash in New York City: Experiments in Latin Music 1970–77 is a 1996 compilation album of Latin music released by Soul Jazz Records in 1996. The album was received positive reviews in The Guardian and Muzik on its initial release. A follow-up album titled Nu Yorica 2! was released in 1997. The album was reissued in 2015 with remastered audio and some re-arranged and re-placed tracks.

== Music ==
The music on the disc is Latin music crossing over with funk, soul music, and jazz. The album was a double album of classic salsa and Latin funk from the 1970s.

== Release ==
Nu Yorica! was released in February 1996 by Soul Jazz Records. Peter Reilly spoke on the labels behalf that Nu Yorica was their first "really successful record" from Soul Jazz noting that "it was more of a kind of cult thing up until then. It opened it up to a lot of people." and that the album sold specifically well in New York. A follow-up album, Nu Yorica 2! was later released by Soul Jazz.

The album was re-issued in 2015. The reissue had its tracks remastered and re-arranged some tracks omitted some tracks and added five bonus tracks such as Ricardo Morera's "My Friend".

== Reception ==
Professional ratings
Review scores
| Source | Rating |
|---|---|
| AllMusic | 4.5/5 stars |
| The Guardian | 4/5 stars |
| Mojo | 4/5 stars |
| Muzik | 5/5 stars |
| Uncut | (9/10) |

Dan Glaister of The Guardian declared the album to be the CD of the week, declaring it an "inspired selection, and Soul Jazz deserve credit for delving further into the murky background of popular dance and jazz music." A reviewer in Muzik declared the compilation "utterly brilliant and well-documented snapshot" and proclaimed that "If you want to know where everyone from Masters at Work to Patrick Pulsinger get their jazz-funk inclinations from, here is the answer." Muzik placed the album among their top ten compilations of the year in January 1997. The magazine noted the release was "Lovingly packaged" and that it was "the definitive round-up of those boss Latin grooves and lost samba drum attacks you've always wanted but been far too skint to fly to New York to find."

Reviewing the re-issue of the album in 2015, John Lewis of Uncut reflected on the album's original release, stating its release was "something of a revelations for many of us." noting that they had never heard Latin music like it and declared it "a landmark Latin comp." Mojo praised the re-release of the album noting the label had remastered it for better sound quality, and declared the album "A great listen from start to finish, propelled by frequent genre-hopping."
