= Punk 45: Kill the Hippies! Kill Yourself! =

Compilation album by Various artists
- Released: November 11, 2013
- Genre: Punk rock
- Length: 55:32
- Label: Soul Jazz
- Compiler: S. Baker

Punk 45 chronology
Punk 45: Kill the Hippies! Kill Yourself! (2013)	Punk 45: There Is No Such Thing As Society (2014)

Punk 45: Kill the Hippies! Kill Yourself! (subtitled: The American Nation Destroys Its Young - Underground Punk in the United States of America, Vol. 1.) is a 2013 compilation album released by Soul Jazz Records. It was Soul Jazz Records' first release in their Punk 45 series documenting punk music released either independently or on non-major labels. The first volume focuses on American music from regions across the United States, ranging from Detroit, Cleveland, San Francisco, Austin, and New Orleans. The album was released to positive reviews from The Guardian, The Irish Times and The Quietus.

== Music and content ==
Punk 45: Kill the Hippies! Kill Yourself! covers punk music released outside of major labels in the United States between 1973 and 1980 ranging from music from Detroit, Cleveland, San Francisco, Austin, and New Orleans among others.

== Release ==
Punk 45: Kill the Hippies! Kill Yourself! was released by Soul Jazz Records on November 11, 2013. It was released to coincide with a publication of a book edited by Jon Savage on punk music cover art.

== Reception ==
Jim Caroll of The Irish Times gave the album a four star out of five rating, stating that the album was"Brimming with both classics and rare cuts" and that it was "a reminder of the many hometown heroes who found a way to channel their anger, frustration and excess energy though a bunch of scratchy riffs topped by a furious opening salvo of one-two-three-four."

Joe Banks of The Quietus proclaimed that the music contained music that was "very much of their time, enjoyably cartoonish or anti-authoritarian without necessarily being socially conscious." and that "for the most part, your enjoyment of this compilation will depend on your enthusiasm/tolerance for shouty blokes with scratchy guitars, knocking out a basic riff and seeing where it takes them". Banks concluded that "this album is ample evidence that its spirit was alive and kicking long before then if only you knew where to look."

Alexis Petridis of The Guardian called the release an "excellent compilation" and proposes that what made the compilation great was that there was dozens of varieties of American punk music comparing more traditional bands like The Heartbreakers to more extreme artists like the electric eels. Petridis also noted that the bands that followed the traditional Ramones influenced sounds like The Normals were strong while the more unique bands such as Theoretical Girls that Petridis compared both The Dead Boys as well as Philip Glass or Steve Reich.

== Track listing ==
1. The Urinals – "I'm a Bug" (1:10)
2. The Normals – "Almost Ready" (2:18)
3. The Hollywood Squares – "Hillside Strangler" (1:54)
4. electric eels – "Agitated" (2:09)
5. Pere Ubu – "The Modern Dance" (3:28)
6. The Randoms – "Let's Get Rid Of New York" (2:40)
7. The Bizarros – "Ice Age" (5:02)
8. The Zeros – "Wild Weekend" (1:31)
9. Tuxedomoon – "Joeboy The Electronic Ghost" (2:57)
10. X Blank X – "Your Full Of Shit" (2:00)
11. Flamin' Groovies – "Dog Meat" (4:02)
12. The Deadbeats – "Kill The Hippies" (2:03)
13. Theoretical Girls – "U.S. Millie" (3:02)
14. The Skunks – "Earthquake Shake" (2:26)
15. Knots – "Action" (2:51)
16. Crash Course in Science – "Cakes In The Home" (1:29)
17. The Pagans – "Not Now No Way" (2:42)
18. Pastiche – "Flash Of The Moment" (3:52)
19. The Lewd – "Kill Yourself" (2:07)
20. Johnny Thunders & The Heartbreakers – "Chinese Rocks" (2:55)
21. The Controllers – "Neutron Bomb" (2:04)

== Credits ==
Credits adapted from the vinyl liner notes.

- S. Baker – compiler, liner notes
- Duncan Cowell – mastering
- Pete Reilly – mastering
- Adrian Self – sleeve design
- Spikey Ponce – sleeve design
- John Jones – vocals, bass (on track "I'm A Bug")
- Kjehl Johansen – guitar (on track "I'm A Bug")
- Kevin Barrett – drums, vocals (on track "I'm A Bug")
- Vitus Matare – producer (on track "I'm A Bug")
- Steve Walters – bass (on track "Almost Ready")
- Chris Luckett – drums, backing vocals (on track "Almost Ready")
- David Brewton – guitar, vocals (on "Almost Ready")
- Charlie Hanson – guitar, vocals (on "Almost Ready")
- Eddie Vincent – guitar, vocals (on "Hillside Strangler")
- Spider Cobb – bass (on "Hillside Strangler")
- Tad Malone – drums (on "Hillside Strangler")
- Ron Hitchock – producer (on "Hillside Strangler")
- John D Morton – guitar (on "Agitated")
- Dave E McManus – vocals (on "Agitated")
- Brian McMahon – guitar (on "Agitated")
- Nick Knox – drums (on "Agitated")
- David Thomas – vocals (on "The Modern Dance")
- Tom Herman – guitar (on "The Modern Dance")
- Tony Maimone – bass, keyboards (on "The Modern Dance")
- Scott Krauss – drums (on "The Modern Dance")
- Allen Ravenstine – keyboards (on "The Modern Dance")
- Pat Garrett – guitar, vocals (on "Let's Get Rid of New York")
- K.K. Barrett – drums (on "Let's Get Rid of New York")
- John Doe – bass (on "Let's Get Rid of New York")
- Nick Nicholis – vocals (on "Ice Age")
- Rick Gabberson – drums (on "Ice Age")
- Jerry parkins – guitar, vocals (on "Ice Age")
- Terry Walker – keyboards, guitar (on "Ice Age")
- Javier Escovedo – guitar, lead vocals (on "Wild Weekend")
- Robert Alan Lopez – guitar, backing vocals (on "Wild Weekend")
- Hector Penalosa – bass (on "Wild Weekend")
- Karton Chenelle – drums (on "Wild Weekend")
- Blaine Reininger – keyboards, violin, guitar (on "Joe Boy the Electronic Ghost")
- Steven Brown – keyboards, clarinet, saxophone (on "Joe Boy the Electronic Ghost")
- Victoria Lowe – vocals (on "Joe Boy the Electronic Ghost")
- Winston Tong – vocals (on "Joe Boy the Electronic Ghost")
- John D Morton –guitar, vocals (on "Your Full of Shit")
- Andrew Kimek – guitar (on "Your Full of Shit")
- James Ellis – bass (on "Your Full of Shit")
- Tony Fier – drums (on "Your Full of Shit")
- Cyril Jordan – guitar, vocals (on "Dog Meat")
- Chris Wilson – guitar, vocals (on "Dog Meat")
- George Alexander – guitar, vocals (on "Dog Meat")
- Tim Lynch – guitar, vocals (on "Dog Meat")
- Danny Mihm – guitar, vocals (on "Dog Meat")
- Scott Guerin – lead vocals, percussion (on "Kill the Hippies")
- Geza X – lead vocals, percussion (on "Kill the Hippies")
- Pasquale Amadeo – lead vocals, percussion (on "Kill the Hippies")
- Shaun Guerin – lead vocals, percussion (on "Kill the Hippies")
- Pat Delaney – saxophone (on "Kill the Hippies")
- Jeffrey Lohn – guitar, vocals (on "U.S. Millie")
- Glen Branca – guitar (on "U.S. Millie")
- Margaret DeWys – keyboards (on "U.S. Millie")
- Wharton Tiers – producer (on "U.S. Millie")
- Jon D. Graham – guitar (on "Earthquake Shake")
- Billy Blackmoon – drums (on "Earthquake Shake")
- Jesse Sublett – bass, vocals (on "Earthquake Shake")
- George Hammerlein – producer (on "Earthquake Shake")
- Joey Pinter – bass (on "Action")
- Jerry Ryan – bass (on "Action")
- Tommy Bell – vocals (on "Action")
- Dale Feliciello – vocals (on "Cakes in The Home")
- Mallory Yago – keyboards, electronics (on "Cakes in The Home")
- Michael Zodorozny – keyboards, electronics (on "Cakes in The Home")
- R.A. La Centra – drums (on "Flash of the Moment")
- Mener Sheene – lead guitar (on "Flash of the Moment")
- Kim Preston – vocals, organ, electric piano, guitar (on "Flash of the Moment")
- Mr. Curt – vocals, guitars (on "Flash of the Moment")
- Dave Godbey – bass, vocals (on "Flash of the Moment")
- Jon Nay – drums (on "Kill Yourself")
- Brad Ramels – guitars, vocals (on "Kill Yourself")
- Kurdt Vanderhoof – bass (on "Kill Yourself")
- J. Setz Beret – vocals (on "Kill Yourself")
- Johnny Thunders – guitar, vocals (on "Chinese Rocks")
- Billy Rath – bass (on "Chinese Rocks")
- Jerry Nolan – drums (on "Chinese Rocks")
- Walter Lure – guitar, vocals (on "Chinese Rocks")
- D.O.A. Danny – bass, vocals (on "Neutron Bomb")
- Kid Spike – guitar, vocals (on "Neutron Bomb")
- Johnny Stingray– guitar, vocals (on "Neutron Bomb")
- Charlie Trash – drums, vocals (on "Neutron Bomb")
