= KaS Product =

French electronic duo

- Origin: Nancy, France
- Genres: Cold wave, minimal wave
- Years active: 1980–1990, 2005–
- Label: DSA
- Past members: Spatsz (Daniel Favre); Mona Soyoc
- Website: KasProduct.com

KaS Product are a French electronic duo. Their music has been considered part of the French cold wave and electropunk movements. Formed in 1980, the duo consisted of Spatsz (Daniel Favre) on electronics and rhythm machines with Mona Soyoc on guitar, vocals and piano. Spatsz worked at a psychiatric hospital previously while Soyoc worked with a jazz band before meeting Spatsz.

Their music is done in a similar minimal electronics and vocal style akin to Kaleidoscope-era Siouxsie and the Banshees, Suicide and Soft Cell. The press compared Soyoc's voice to that of Siouxsie Sioux.

Their first and second albums were re-released with bonus tracks. Try Out was re-released with five bonus tracks: "Mind", "Seven", "Doctor Insane", "In Need", and "Malena". By Pass was re-released with four bonus tracks: "Scape", "Sweet & Sour", "Crash" and "Party". All of the tracks on both CDs have been remastered.

Gorgeously provocative duo of Mona Soyoc and Spatz who released a couple of singles on their own punk label, then signed to RCA which seemed a remarkably odd union, which produced two blindingly brilliant albums, 'Try Out' and 'Bypass' that found the haunting, mad vocals hemmed in by and stretched out over the alternately boiling/icy keyboards, the shattering chatter of arching/dive bombing guitar and stabbing electronic rhythms. - Mick Mercer

On 1 February 2019, it was announced that Spatsz had died. He was 61 years old.

Per videos on YouTube with a 2022 copyright, now KaS Product Reload with Thomas Bouetel (machines) and Pierre Corneau (Basse) joining Mona. Their Facebook activity is current as of September, 2024, and they have several live videos on their Youtube channel from 2024 concerts in France.

A new album, Reloaded, is due to be released at the end of March 2025.

== Discography ==
Title	Year
Play Loud	1980
Try Out	1982
By Pass	1983
Ego Eye	1987
Black & Noir	1990
Tribute	2022
Reloaded	2025
