= The Marvels (band) =

British reggae group

- Genres: Reggae
- Past members: Alex "Dimples" Hinds; Cornell "Ornell" Hinds; Eddie Smith

The Marvels were a UK-based reggae group active between 1962 and 1982. Originally active in Jamaica, Alex "Dimples" Hinds and Cornell "Ornell" Hinds and Eddie Smith formed their group in the UK. The guitarist and saxophonist Pepe Bartholomeusz played for six years with the band in the 1960s.

The band specialised in doo-wop harmonies. Dimples and Ornell Hinds are married to each other.

After the group was disbanded, Dimples and his daughter Donna Hinds become DJs on the London reggae radio station RJR (98.3 FM).
