= Try Out (Kas Product album) =

Studio album by KaS Product
- Released: 1982
- Recorded: August 1981 at Sunrise Studio
- Genre: Coldwave
- Label: RCA
- Producers: KaS Product, G. N'Guyen

KaS Product chronology
Play Loud (1980)	Try Out (1982)	By Pass (1983)

Try Out is the debut studio album by French coldwave band KaS Product. It was released in 1982, through record label RCA.

== Track listing ==
All tracks are written by KaS Product (Mona Soyoc, Spatsz).

Side A
No.	Title	Length
1.	"One of the Kind"	3:25
2.	"Man of Time"	3:22
3.	"No Shame"	3:15
4.	"Countdown"	3:24
5.	"Never Come Back"	3:17
6.	"Underground Movie"	2:38

Side B
No.	Title	Length
1.	"So Young But So Cold"	3:00
2.	"Digging in a Hole"	3:04
3.	"Sober"	4:28
4.	"Breakloose"	2:58
5.	"Pussy X"	3:31

== Critical reception ==
Professional ratings
Review scores
Source	Rating
AllMusic	4/5 stars

AllMusic called the album "so good it's almost a crime that KaS Product haven't gained more attention".

== Personnel ==
- Mona Soyoc – vocals, guitar, production
- Spatsz – electronics, production

Technical

- G. N'Guyen – production
- E. Conod – engineering
- R. Vogel – engineering
