= Klaus Weiß =

German handball player (1944–2000)

Klaus Weiß (20 November 1944 – 8 June 2000) was an East German former handball player who competed in the 1972 Summer Olympics. He was born in Breslau. In 1972 he was part of the East German team which finished fourth in the Olympic tournament. He played four matches.
