= Lloyd McNeill =

American musical artist (1935–2021)

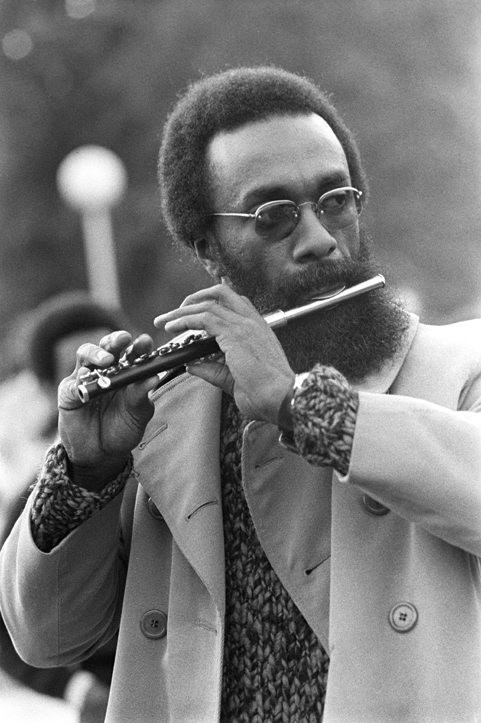
- McNeill playing in Washington Square Park, New York City (October 1970)

Background information
- Born: April 12, 1935; Washington, D.C., United States
- Died: October 5, 2021 (aged 85) New York City
- Genres: Jazz
- Occupations: Flutist, Canvas Painter, Educator
- Instrument: Flute
- Website: www.lloydmcneill.com

Lloyd McNeill (born in Washington, D.C.) was a jazz flutist and visual artist based out of New York City. He is generally recognized as a jazz flutist of eminent ability, alongside James Newton, Yusef Lateef, Sam Rivers, James Moody, Bobbi Humphrey and Eric Dolphy.

== Biography ==
Having studied Art and Zoology in Morehouse College, Atlanta, he moved on to be the first recipient of Howard University's MFA degree (1963). In 1964-5, he did further study in Lithography at Paris' L'Ecole Nationale Des Beaux Arts. During his residence in France, he spent a considerable amount of time with Pablo Picasso and his wife, Jacqueline in Cannes. He has also studied music composition privately with the composer Hale Smith, music theory and flute technique with the jazz musician Eric Dolphy, and classical flute technique and repertoire with Harold Jones. McNeill taught at several institutes of higher education, and was Professor Emeritus of Mason Gross School of the Arts, at Rutgers University, New Jersey, having retired in 2001. Through the 1970s, and in addition to his position in Art, McNeill also taught Afro-American Music History, private flute lessons, and was instrumental in launching the Jazz Studies Program at Rutgers University.

McNeill has exhibited his paintings and drawings at several galleries and colleges in the U.S. Northeast. He published two volumes of poems: Blackline: A Collection of Poems, Drawings and Photographs and After the Rain: A Collection of New Poems. In 2007, Lloyd McNeill was chosen by the USPS to design a postage stamp for the celebration of Kwanzaa 2009.

== Discography ==
- 1969: Asha (with Gene Rush, Steve Novosel, Eric Gravatt, Paul Hawkins)
- 1969: Tanner Suite (duo with bassist Marshall Hawkins)
- 1970: Washington Suite
- 1976: Treasures (with Dom Salvador, Cecil McBee, Ray Armando, Brian Brake, Portinho)
- 1978: Tori (with Dom Salvador, Amaury Tristao, John T. La Barbera, Buster Williams, Victor Lewis, Dom Um Romao, Nana Vasconcelos, Howard Johnson)

Mr. McNeill's albums "Asha" and "Washington Suite" have recently been reissued by the London-based company, "Soul Jazz."

- 1980: Elegia
- 1998: X.Tem.Por.E
