= In the Beginning There Was Rhythm (album) =

Compilation album by various artists
- Released: 28 January 2002
- Genre: Post-punk
- Label: Soul Jazz
- Compiler: Stuart Baker, Adrian Self

In the Beginning There Was Rhythm is a 2002 compilation album compiled by Stuart Baker and Adrian Self and released by Soul Jazz Records. The album consists of post-punk from the United Kingdom from the late 1970s to the early 1980s made in the United Kingdom.

== Release ==
In the Beginning There Was Rhythm was released by Soul Jazz Records on 28 January 2002. The album was released on compact disc and vinyl record.

== Reception ==
Professional ratings
Review scores
| Source | Rating |
|---|---|
| AllMusic | 4.5/5 stars |
| The Guardian | 4/5 stars |
| Muzik | 5/5 stars |
| Now | 4/5 stars |
| Pitchfork Media | (9.3/10) |

From contemporary reviews, Andy Kellman of AllMusic found that the album "does a spectacular job of combining the known with the not so known" and that the album showcased "post-punk's breadth, showcasing within the grooves, jabs, and rattling waves of static the style's influences (disco, funk, reggae, Krautrock, electronic experimentation) and the styles that the style influenced (indie rock, post-rock, almost every stripe of dance music that followed) at the same time." Kellman felt that "one might bemoan the exclusion of Public Image Limited, Associates, the Normal, Magazine, or other bands crucial to the ideology, there's no denying that In the Beginning There Was Rhythm is a great gateway into this expansive, fruitful, trailblazing era." Chris Dahlen of Pitchfork praised the album stating that "Every track on this album cooks with the excitement of musicians trying new things." and "doesn't have a single limp tune" while stating "If there's anything's wrong with the disc, it's that it's too short; the story of post-punk could take up several box sets. The disc comes with 35 pages of liner notes, but the record itself doesn't tell a story or connect the songs. Many bands got left out, and it would also be interesting to hear how the bands developed-- for example, to watch the early Human League with its craptronic keyboards and all-guy line-up grow into the band that created the synth-pop masterpiece Dare." Garry Mulholland of The Guardian gave the album a four-star rating, stating "to the ranting agit-prop commitment of Gang of Four and Pop Group. In the Beginning is essential missing-link history – and body-rockin' fun". In Muzik, their reviewer "TM" gave the album a five out of five out of five rating, calling it "a choice selection [...] from the fertile post-punk period" when "bands thought nothing of combining politics and philosophy with imported dance rhythms and edgy industrial angst." concluding the album was "Fantastic. Listen and learn." Matt Galloway listed the album as a "Critic's Pick" in Now. Galloway noted that tracks like "Knife Slits Water" and "She Is Beyond Good and Evil" were "Groundbreaking stuff" but "hasn't aged particularly well" while finding "Coup", "Sluggin' Fer Jesus" and "Being Boiled" were "More natural and still fresh-sounding".

== Track listing ==
Track listing adapted from back of album sleeve and liner notes.

| No. | Title | Writer(s) | Credited performer | Length |
|---|---|---|---|---|
| 1. | "Shack Up" | J. Carter, M. Daniels | A Certain Ratio | 3:16 |
| 2. | "Coup" | Alex Turnbull, Johnny Turnbull, Fritz Catlin, Peter Martin | 23 Skidoo | 4:10 |
| 3. | "To Hell with Poverty" | Jon King, Dave Allen, Andy Gill, Hugo Burnham | Gang of Four | 4:57 |
| 4. | "Being Boiled" | Philip Oakey, Martyn Ware, Ian Craig Marsh | The Human League | 3:50 |
| 5. | "In the Beginning There Was Rhythm" | The Slits | The Slits | 5:35 |
| 6. | "24 Track Loop" | Charles Bullen, Charles Hayward, Gareth Williams | This Heat | 5:57 |
| 7. | "20 Jazz Funk Greats" | Throbbing Gristle | Throbbing Gristle | 2:44 |
| 8. | "She Is Beyond Good and Evil" | The Pop Group | The Pop Group | 3:22 |
| 9. | "Sluggin for Jesus" | Richard H. Kirk, Stephen Mallinder, Chris Watson | Cabaret Voltaire | 5:02 |
| 10. | "Vegas El Bandito" | Turnbull, Turnbull, Catlin, Sam Mills, Tom Heslop | 23 Skidoo | 2:56 |
| 11. | "Knife Slits Water" | Donald Johnson, Martin Moscrop, Jez Kerr, Peter Terrell, Simon Topping | A Certain Ratio | 9:40 |

== Credits ==
Track listing adapted from back of album sleeve and liner notes.

- Stuart Baker – compiler, sleeve notes
- Adrian Self – compiler
- Jon Savage – editing
- Pete Reilly – mastering
- Duncan Cowell – mastering
- Sir Dan Flea – design
- B.Uttocks – design
- Pierce Smith – repro man
- Angela Scott – licensing
