= Rumble in the Jungle (compilation album) =

Compilation album by Various Artists
- Released: April 30, 2007
- Genre: Jungle
- Label: Soul Jazz

Rumble in the Jungle is a 2007 compilation album released by Soul Jazz Records. It compiles early 1990s ragga jungle tracks.

== Music ==
Robin Wilks of Plan B magazine described the compilation as a combination of the "super hits" with tracks like "Incredible", "Original Nuttah", "Super Sharp Shooter") along with obscure odds and ends.

== Release ==
Rumble in the Jungle was released on April 30, 2007, by Soul Jazz Records on compact disc and vinyl. The track "Super Sharp Shooter" was only included on the CD version of the album.

== Reception ==
Professional ratings
Review scores
Source	Rating
Pitchfork	(7.5/10)

From contemporary reviews, Jess Harvell stated that Rumble in the Jungle, as a collection of 1990s jungle music, "is not necessarily the perfect introduction to a genre that's become something of a forgotten story", but that new fans to the genre "will find it easy to look past the deficiencies that longtime jungle obsessives (including myself) have been complaining about on message boards and blogs-- the obviousness of the tracklisting, the deathly dry packaging, the deeply contentious liner notes, the preponderance of tracks by renegade hip-housers Shut Up and Dance-- Rumble may still one of the best (or at least easy to actually procure) old-school jungle comps for newbies that's currently out there." Colin Buttimer of BBC Music praised the album stating that "Every one of Rumble in the Jungle’s thirteen tracks is brimming over with life and sonic thrills" and that "some of this music was released in ‘91, but it sounds like it was made yesterday. If you want to shake the sleep from your eyes and bring the sun out from behind the clouds, Rumble in the Jungle is the record you need to be hearing." Matt Earp of XLR8R praised the compilation stating that "Soul Jazz's string of success continues with this dynamite showcase of the UK jungle sound of 1994" stating that "the comp's real strength is the rare gems, which place Jungle in the larger musical context that helped shape its sound" noting the addition of Ragga Twins and Shut Up and Dance tracks. David Dacks of Exclaim! proclaimed the album to be "an essential document" and that it was a "definitive compilation [that] profiles the revolutionary sound of early jungle, circa the dawn of the 90s." Dacks also praised the sound quality of the album stating that "the mastering sounds better than it was back in the day" noting specifically the Ragga Twins tracks sure sound better." Wilks wrote in Plan B that due to the albums tracklist, the album "is questionable when there are more comprehensive collections available." Wilks also critiqued the album cover, stating it looked more like a sixties jazz reissue than a "riot of junglist nuttahs."

== Track listing ==
Tracklisting adapted from album's liner notes and sleeve.

No.	Title	Writer(s)	Credited Performer	Length
1.	"One Bible"	Asher Senator	Asher Senator	5:02
2.	"Bad Boy Lick a New Shot (Jungle Bullet)"	D. Ballantine, R. Price, M. Davis, G. Foreman, L. James	Ninjaman, Bounty Killer, Beenie Man and Ninja Ford	5:58
3.	"Incredible"	M Beat	M Beat with General Levy	4:16
4.	"Under Mi Sensi (X-Project Remix)"	Love, B. Levy, Davis	Barrington Levy and Beenie Man	4:16
5.	"Ragga Trip"	Smiley, PJ, Deman, Flinty	Ragga Twins	4:37
6.	"Press the Trigger"	D. McDermott, Fashion	Poison Chang	5:32
7.	"No Doubt"	Smiley, PJ	Shut Up and Dance	4:41
8.	"Original Nuttah"	A, Williams, Lakfa	UK Apachi and Shy FX	4:00
9.	"Illegal Gunshot"	Smiley, PJ, Deman, Flinty	Ragga Twins	4:01
10.	"Super Sharp Shooter"		DJ Zinc	6:28
11.	"Oh Jungle"	Ben Intellect	Ben Intellect and Ragga G	4:55
12.	"Limb by Limb"	P. Thomas, Fashion	Cutty Ranks	4:59
13.	"Tan So Back"	Smiley, PJ, Deman, Flinty	Ragga Twins	3:55

== Credits ==
Credits adapted from the vinyl liner notes.

- Stuart Baker – sleeve notes
- Adrian Self – sleeve design
- Sizewell Scissors – sleeve design
- Duncan Coweel – mastering
- Pete Reilly – mastering
- Lawrence Watson – photography
- Stefan de Batselier – photography
- Martyn Goodacre – photography
- Shy FX – producer (on "Original Nuttah")
- Smiley & PJ – producer on "Illegal Gunshot" and "Tan so Black"
- Half Breed – remix producer on "Press the Trigger"
- Ben Intellect – producer on "Oh Jungle"
- DJ SS – remixer producer on "Limb by Limb"
