= Experimental rock =

Music genre

- Other names: Avant-rock; avant-garde rock; avant-garde rock and roll (early)
- Stylistic origins: Rock; avant-garde; experimental; free jazz; noise; musique concrète; free improvisation; tape music; sound collage
- Cultural origins: 1960s; United States and United Kingdom
- Derivative forms: Art rock

Subgenres
- Krautrock; art punk; noise rock; no wave; avant-prog; zeuhl; post-rock; math rock; mathcore; post-progressive; brutal prog

Other topics
- Avant-garde metal; avant-pop; electronics in rock music; experimental pop; industrial music; post-punk; progressive rock; psychedelic rock; shoegaze

Experimental rock (originally known as avant-garde rock or avant-rock) is a subgenre of rock music that emerged in the 1960s. The genre emphasizes innovation over commercial appeal, incorporating influences and ideas lifted from avant-garde music through traditional rock music instrumentation. It is primarily characterized by its use of unconventional song structures, musical techniques, rhythms and lyricism, usually deemed challenging, difficult, inaccessible or underground.

== Etymology ==
Experimental rock was originally referred to as "avant-garde rock and roll" by music publications throughout the mid- to late 1960s. The earliest known use of the term was in 1966, in an issue of Sing Out!, which labelled New York City band the Fugs an "avant-garde rock and roll group". That same year, Record Research also used the term "avant-garde rock" in an issue describing the musical catalog of radio station WPMU, while the following year Canadian publication Take One used the phrase to describe California's the Mothers of Invention and the Gas Company, as well as New York's the Velvet Underground. By the late 1960s and 1970s, several music publications published articles using the term as well as "experimental rock". Additionally, some experimental rock acts would be referred to as "art rock".

== Characteristics ==
Experimental rock incorporates influences and ideas lifted from avant-garde music through traditional rock instrumentation. It is characterized by the use of unconventional song structures, techniques, rhythms, and approaches to lyricism not typically found in traditional rock music, often emphasizing innovation over commercial appeal, with artists frequently associated with "underground music". Artists drew influences from contemporary art movements such as dadaism, conceptual art, pop art and surrealism.

== History ==
=== 1930s–1950s: Forerunners ===
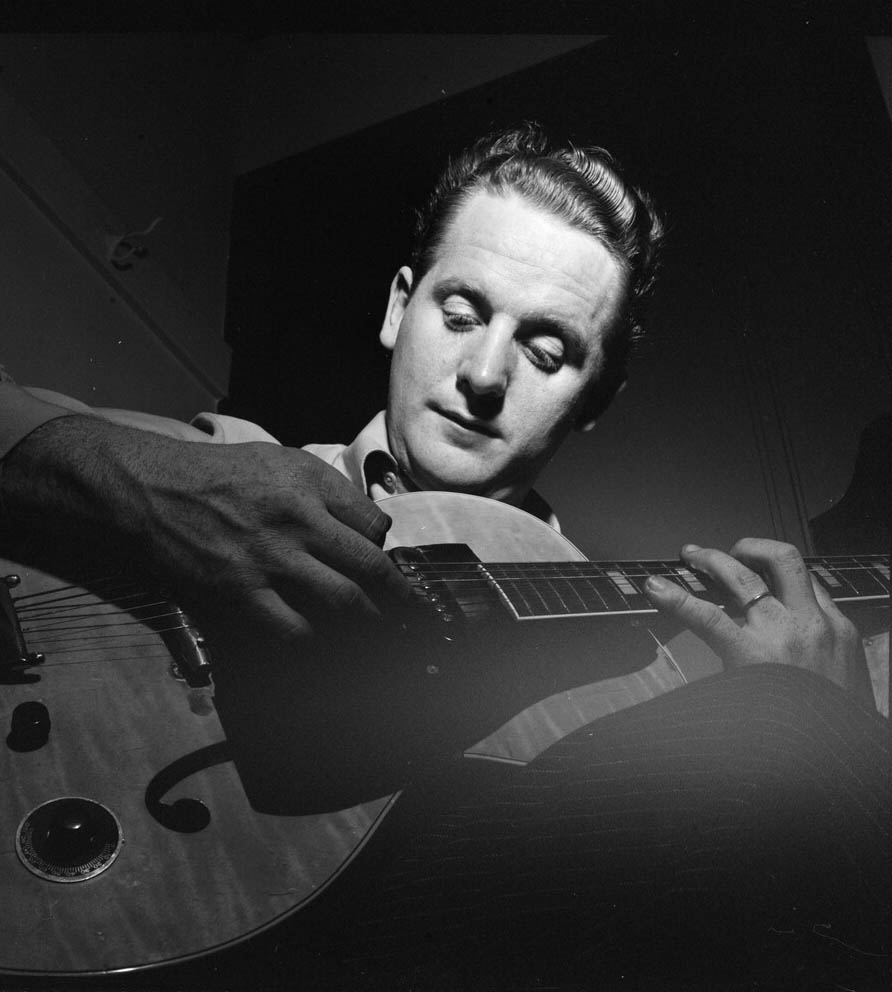
Les Paul released "How High The Moon" in 1951, which showcased early audio effects such as flanging, delay, phasing, and vari-speed

Although not associated with the avant-garde, during the early years of rock and roll, several artists experimented with the medium, creating innovative techniques that would become staples of the genre. In 1930, Les Paul became an early innovator of overdubbing, originally creating multi-track recordings by using a modified disk lathe to record several generations of sound on a single disk, before later using tape technology, having been given one of the first Ampex 300 series tape recorders as a gift from Bing Crosby. During the early 1940s–1950s, labels such as King Records, Sun Records, and Stax played a crucial role in the development of jazz, rhythm and blues, and early rock and roll, which were initially sidelined by the major companies alongside pioneering musical and production techniques, with Atlantic being the first label to make recordings in stereo, while Sun's Sam Phillips and Chess introduced slapback echo and makeshift echo chambers. Additionally, independent labels were often the only platforms available for marginalized African-American musicians in the U.S. at the time.

At the time, guitar amplifiers were often low-fidelity, and would often produce distortion when their volume (gain) was increased beyond their design limit or if they sustained minor damage. Between 1935 and 1945, guitarists such as Bob Dunn, Junior Barnard, Elmore James and Buddy Guy experimented with early distortion-based guitar sounds. In early rock music, Goree Carter's "Rock Awhile" (1949) and Joe Hill Louis' "Boogie in the Park" (1950) featured an over-driven electric guitar style similar to that of Chuck Berry's sound several years later. By 1950, electric guitarists began "doctoring" amplifiers and speakers to emulate this form of distortion, which was also inspired by the accidental damage to amps, featured in popular recordings such as Ike Turner and the Kings of Rhythm song "Rocket 88" released in March 1951, where guitarist Willie Kizart used a vacuum tube amplifier that had a speaker cone slightly damaged in transport. Subsequent developments in rock music distortion were pioneered by guitarists such as Willie Johnson of Howlin' Wolf's band, Guitar Slim, Chuck Berry, Pat Hare of James Cotton's band, Paul Burlison of the Johnny Burnette Trio, and Link Wray throughout the 1950s.

On March 26, 1951, Les Paul released "How High The Moon", performed with his then-wife Mary Ford, and spent 25 weeks (beginning on March 26, 1951) on the Billboard chart, which included 9 weeks at #1. At the time, the song featured a significant amount of overdubbing, along with other studio techniques such as flanging, delay, phasing and vari-speed. Les Paul's advancements in recording were seen in the adoption of his techniques by artists like Buddy Holly. In 1958, Holly released "Words of Love" and "Listen to Me", which were composed with overdubbing for added instrumentation and harmonies.

Subsequently, the single "Space Guitar" by Johnny "Guitar" Watson, released in April 1954, showcased over-the-top guitar playing and the heavy use of reverb and echo effects, which influenced artists such as Bo Diddley, Ike Turner, Frank Zappa, and Jimi Hendrix.

=== 1960s: Origins ===
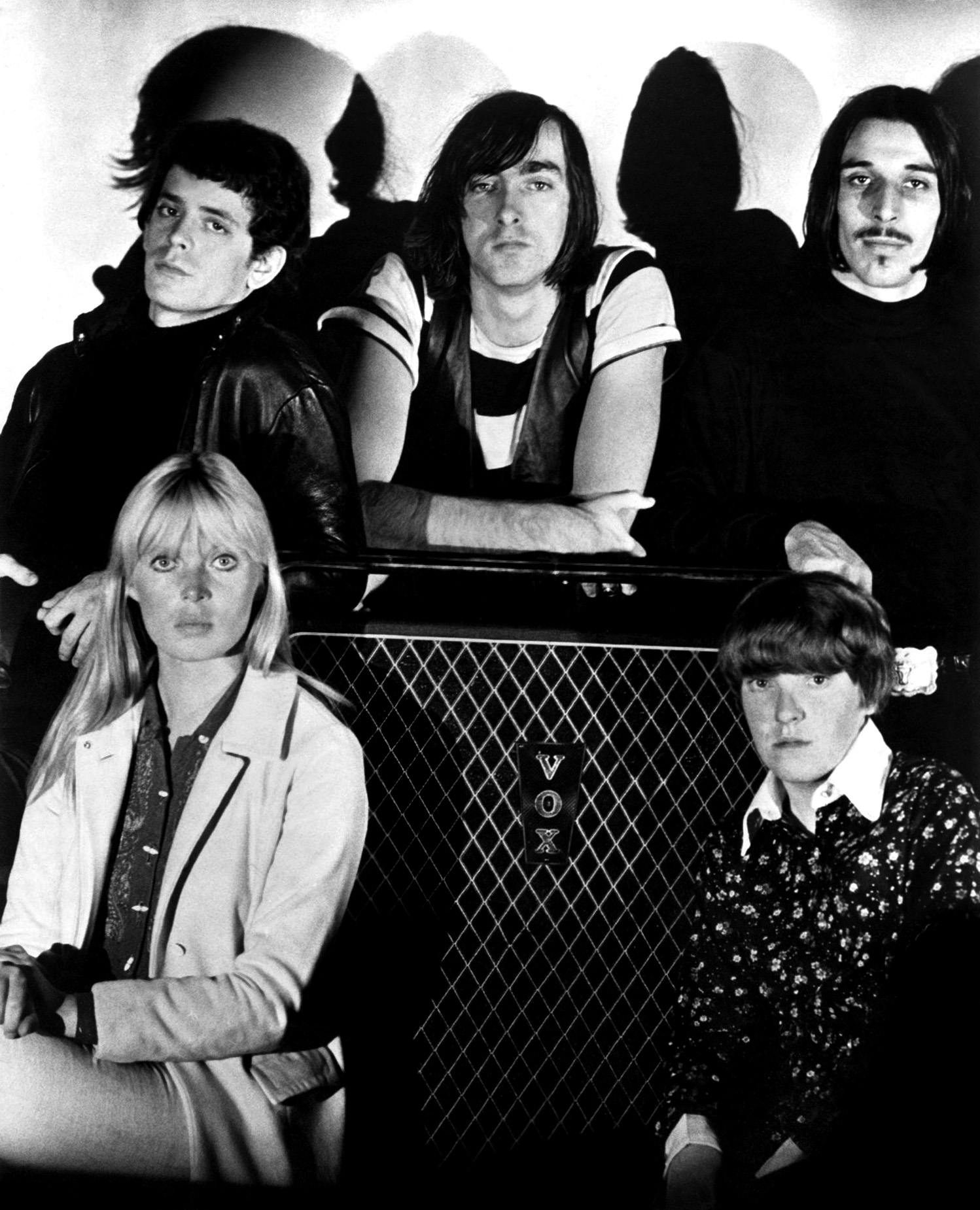
The Velvet Underground and Nico were an influential experimental rock act in the late 1960s

Although experimentation had always existed in rock music, it was not until the early to mid-1960s that the genre widely began to incorporate influences from contemporary art, the avant-garde, and the wider art world. English artists such as members of the Beatles, the Who, the Rolling Stones, the Kinks, 10cc, the Move, the Yardbirds, and Pink Floyd attended and drew avant-garde ideas from art school, which they incorporated into a traditional rock and roll framework. Pete Townshend's avant-garde ideas which he learnt in art school such as that of auto-destructive art, inspired his guitar smashing in the Who, while others such as Syd Barrett drew influence from avant-garde music movements like free improvisation, particularly the prepared guitar techniques of AMM's Keith Rowe, which he incorporated into his psychedelic free-form guitar playing in Pink Floyd through the use of a zippo lighter as a guitar slide. Additionally, rock musicians drew from previous counterculture movements such as the Beat Generation, as well as contemporaneous developments in experimental film, literature, and music. Other early influences included avant-garde and free jazz, musique concrète, and the works of composers Igor Stravinsky, John Cage, Karlheinz Stockhausen, and Luciano Berio. Subsequently, early attempts to merge the avant-garde with rock music were made by several underground music acts such as the Druds, the Fugs, the Daevid Allen Trio, the Mothers of Invention, the Velvet Underground, Nico, Nihilist Spasm Band, Soft Machine, the Godz, Red Krayola, Hapshash and the Coloured Coat, Silver Apples, the United States of America, Cromagnon, Fifty Foot Hose, the Sperm, Pärson Sound, and Pink Floyd, who incorporated elements of avant-garde music, sound collage, and poetry into their work. (Note: Author Barry Miles commented on Pink Floyd, "They were the first people I'd ever heard who were combining some kind of intellectual experimentation with rock 'n' roll". Photographer John Hopkins remembers: "The band did not play music, they were playing sounds. Waves and walls of sound, quite unlike anything anybody in rock 'n' roll had played before. It was like people in serious, nonpopular music".) Commercially successful British acts such as the Rolling Stones and the Beatles would also incorporate avant-garde influences into their music, with the latter's songs "Carnival of Light" and "Revolution 9".

==== East Coast: New York's Lower East Side Scene ====
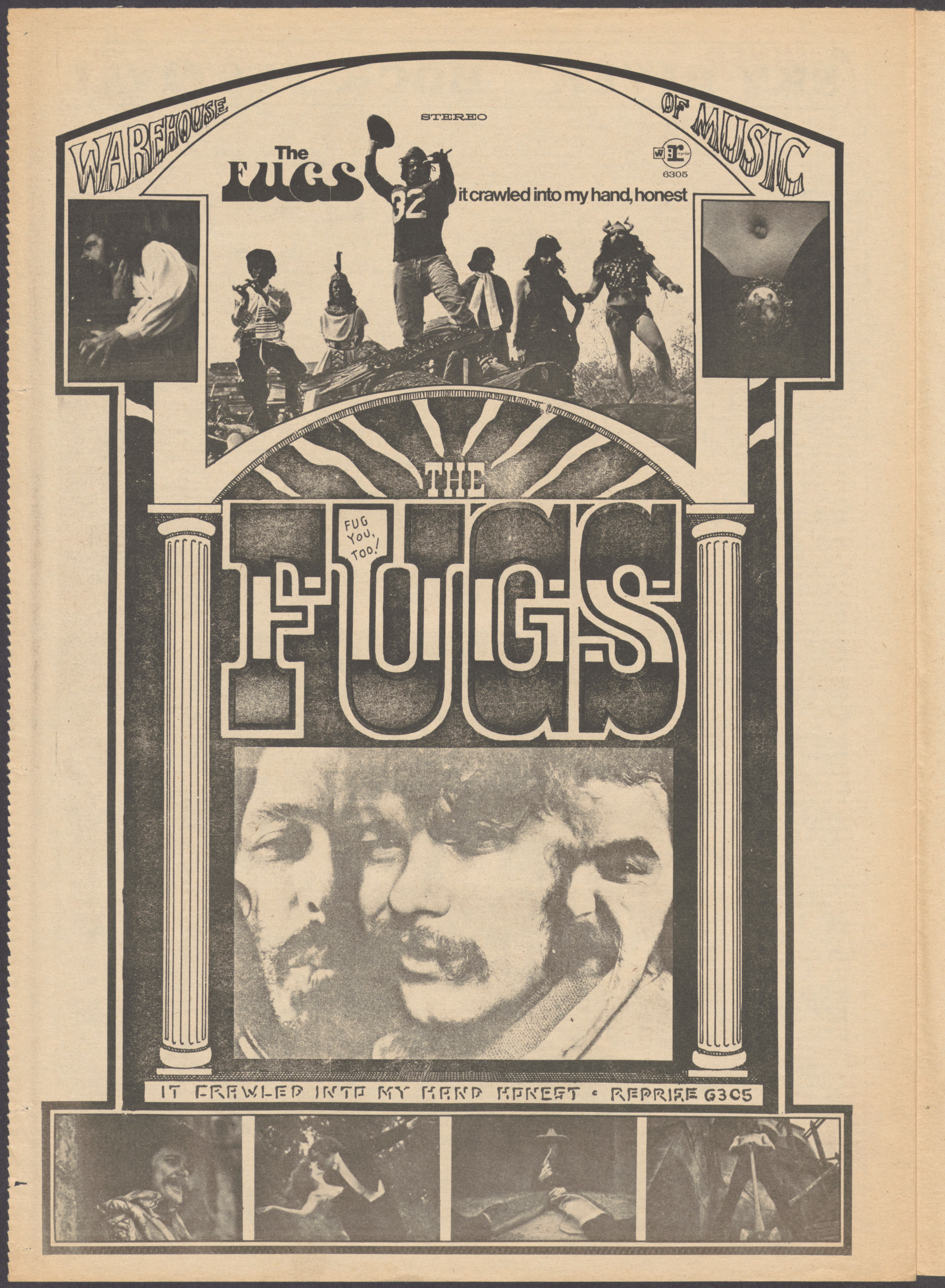
The Fugs' promotional poster for their album It Crawled into My Hand, Honest, 1968

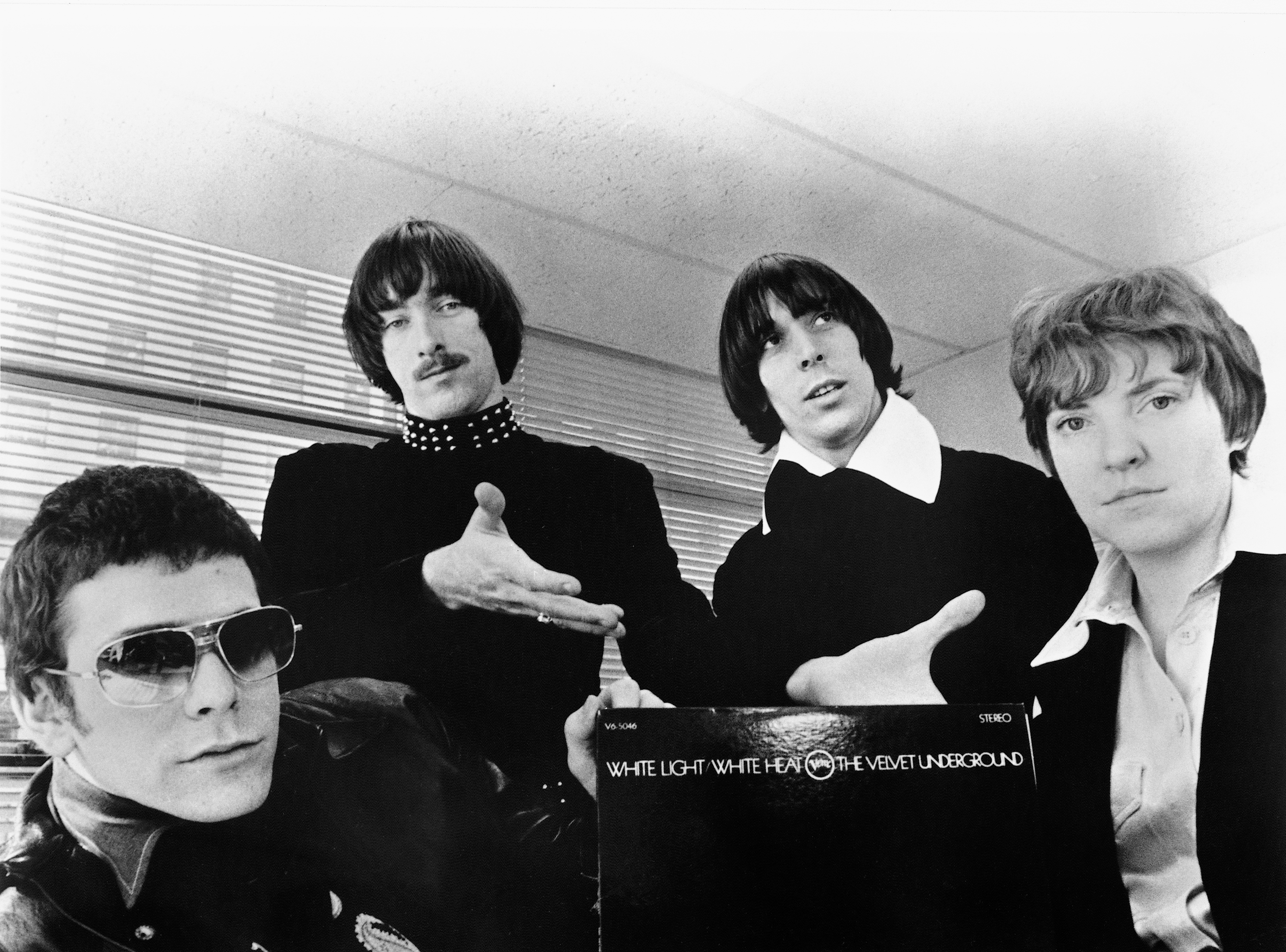
A publicity photo of the Velvet Underground holding a copy of White Light/White Heat c. 1968.

In 1963, New York visual artist and underground film producer Andy Warhol formed a short-lived avant-garde band known as the Druds, alongside local conceptual artists, Walter De Maria, Larry Poons, La Monte Young, Patty Mucha, Jasper Johns, Gloria Graves and Lucas Samaras. Subsequently, influential underground rock band the Fugs were formed by Ed Sanders and Tuli Kupferberg on the Lower East Side, who were later described as helping to "bridge the gap between the Beat Generation and experimental rock". Their songs blended beat poetry and folk music with rock and roll, and they collaborated frequently with New York folk-based act the Holy Modal Rounders, formed in 1963 by Peter Stampfel and Steve Weber, who both later briefly joined the band. The Fugs were an early influence on Lou Reed, David Peel, Iggy Pop, and several early underground and experimental rock acts such as the Godz.

By late 1965, Warhol began scouting for bands to represent the music for his multimedia art performance series the Exploding Plastic Inevitable. Warhol briefly considered the Fugs and the Holy Modal Rounders before ultimately choosing the Velvet Underground, who were first introduced to him by Barbara Rubin, through Gerard Malanga, at the beatnik venue Café Bizarre in December 1965. (Note: According to Gerard Malanga, the Bockris book's account of the introduction gets a few details wrong in regard to who was present in the Café Bizarre on which night. Also, according to Rosebud Pettet, Rubin made the introduction at Pettet's urging. All the sources seem to agree on one thing, however: It was Barbara Rubin who arranged the introduction.) They merged the influence of avant-garde artists such as La Monte Young, John Cage, and the Theatre of Eternal Music, as well as minimalism and drone music, with rock instrumentation. These performance art happenings aimed to bridge the gap between the avant-garde and popular music, mixing screenings of Warhol's films, the Velvet Underground's experimental rock music, and dancing and performance art by regulars of Warhol's Factory.

Additionally, the independent record label ESP-Disk became a pivotal force in the early New York counterculture and underground music scene, signing early avant-garde rock artists such as the Fugs, the Godz, Pearls Before Swine, and later Cromagnon. Other East Coast psychedelic acts that drew from experimental rock music included the Deep, the Tea Company, and Blues Magoos. In 1966, ESP released the Velvet Underground's earliest recording, an instrumental entitled "Noise", which appeared on the various-artists compilation album The East Village Other [aka Electric Newspaper]. At the same time, Lou Reed taught and gave guitar lessons to Fluxus artist Henry Flynt, who later formed the short-lived avant-garde rock band the Insurrections. Additionally, Flynt briefly performed with the Velvet Underground, playing violin as a stand-in for John Cale at a concert in September, 1966. In March 1967, the band released the influential debut album The Velvet Underground & Nico, produced by Andy Warhol, which was followed by White Light/White Heat in 1968. Later that year, New York band Silver Apples, formed by Simeon Coxe and Danny Taylor, incorporated the sounds of oscillators into an early form of electronic rock on their debut album.

==== Development of production techniques ====
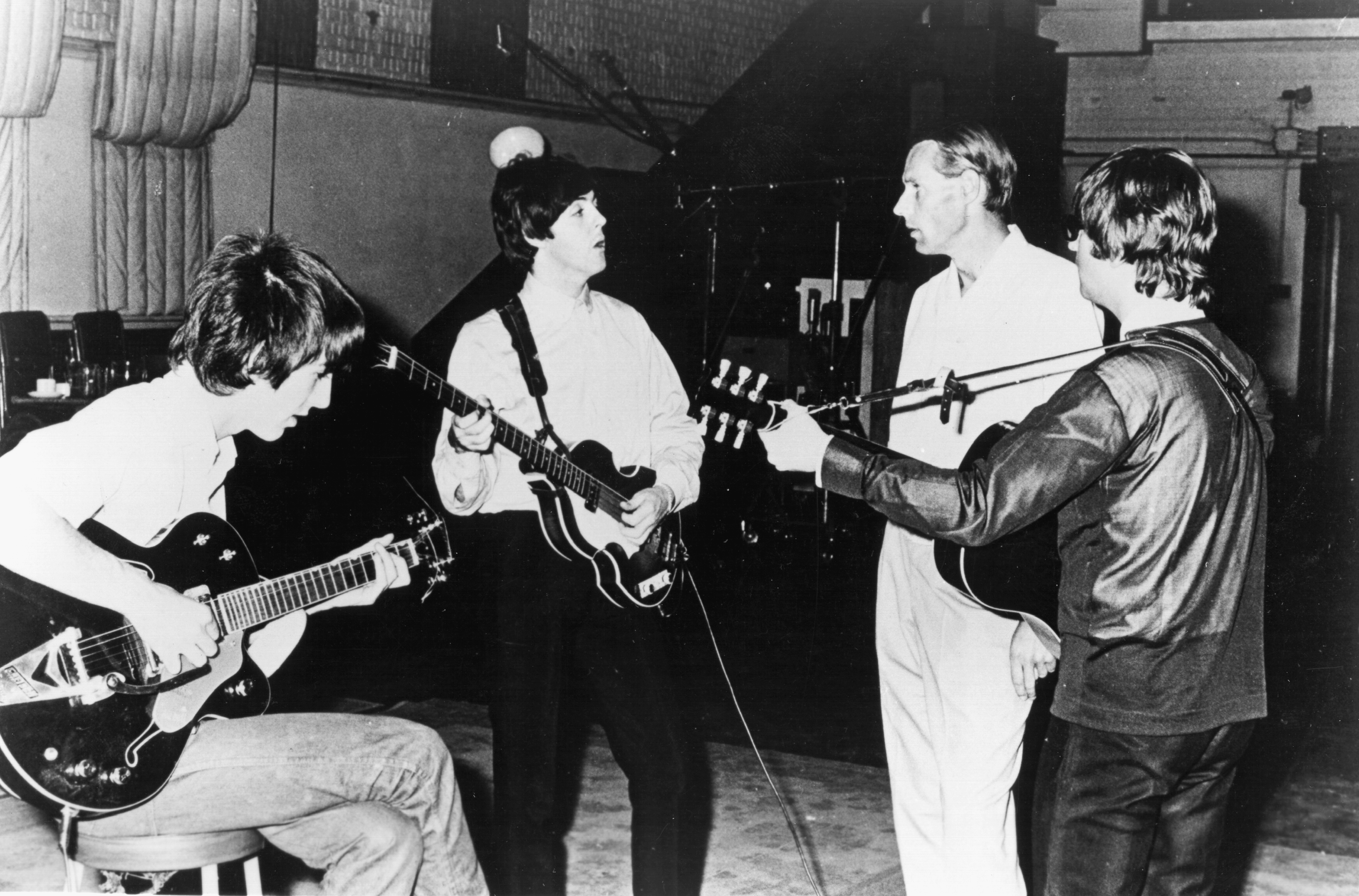
The Beatles 1964 track "I Feel Fine" was the first commercially released rock song to feature deliberate guitar feedback

During the early 1960s, guitar distortion became integral to contemporary rock music, and was further developed by musicians such as Link Wray, Grady Martin of Marty Robbins's band, Dave Davies of the Kinks, and Keith Richards of the Rolling Stones, while Grady Martin and Keith Richards pioneered and popularized the use of fuzz distortion in rock music. Other forms of early rock music experimentation included a deliberate use of guitar feedback, which was pioneered by blues and rock and roll guitarists such as Willie Johnson, Johnny Watson, and Link Wray. According to AllMusic's Richie Unterberger, the very first use of intentional feedback on a commercial rock record is the introduction of the song "I Feel Fine" by the Beatles, recorded in 1964. Jay Hodgson agrees that this feedback created by John Lennon leaning a semi-acoustic guitar against an amplifier was "the first chart-topper" to showcase feedback distortion. The Who's 1965 hits "Anyway, Anyhow, Anywhere" and "My Generation" featured feedback manipulation by Pete Townshend, with an extended solo in the former and the shaking of his guitar in front of the amplifier to create a throbbing noise in the latter. By 1965, feedback was used extensively by the Monks, Frank Zappa, Jefferson Airplane, and the Velvet Underground, and later the Grateful Dead, Jimi Hendrix, and underground music acts like Michael Yonkers, whose use of feedback was described by Dazed as far more extreme than any of his contemporaries.

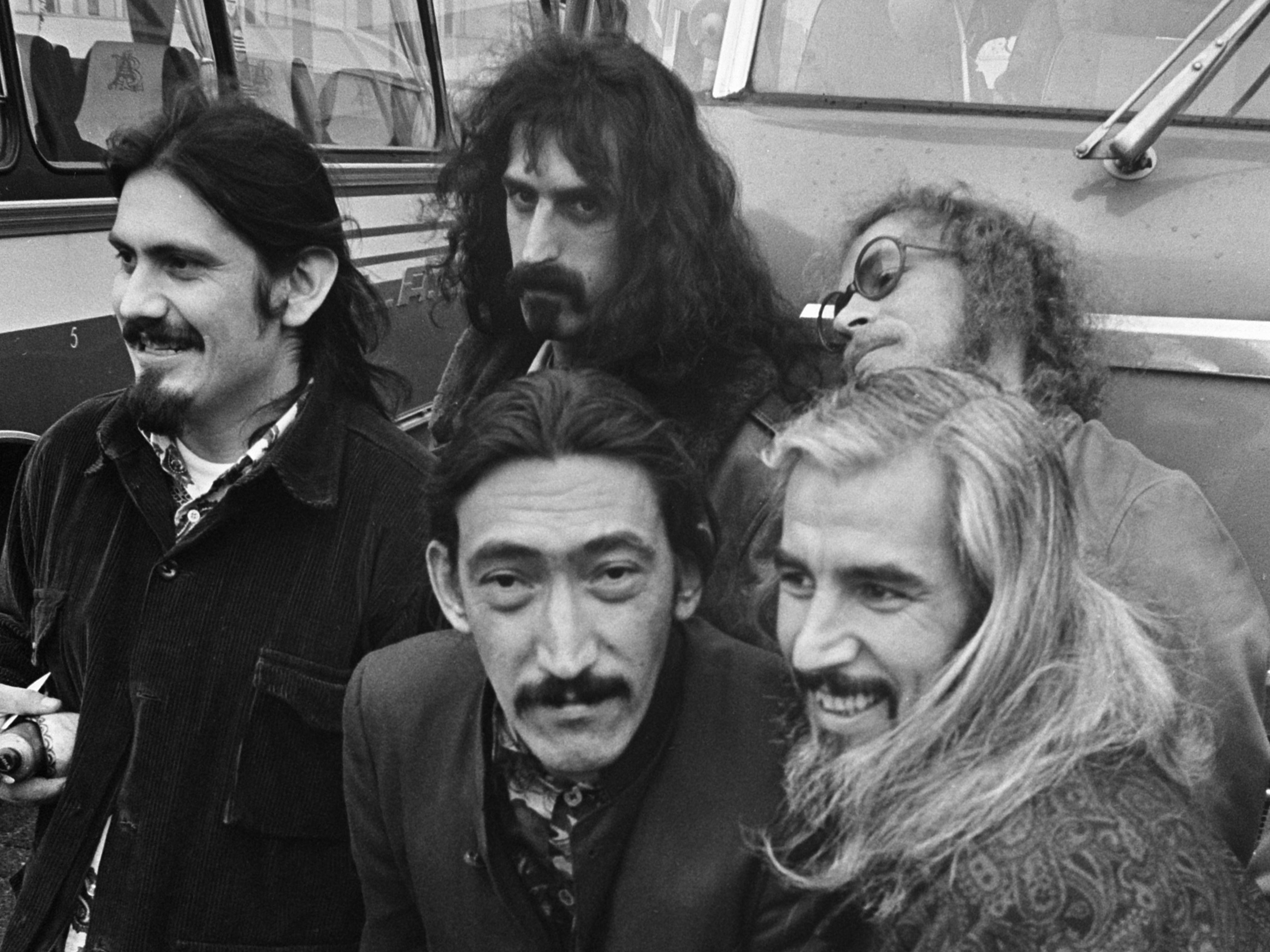
Frank Zappa's the Mothers of Invention released Freak Out! in 1966, which inspired several experimental rock bands

Throughout the decade, the advancing technology of multitrack recording and mixing boards inspired prominent artists to create complex and layered compositions. Producers such as Joe Meek, Phil Spector, the Beach Boys' Brian Wilson, Beatles producer George Martin and engineer Geoff Emerick contributed to the pioneering of the recording studio as an instrument. (Note: In the popular music of the early 1960s, it was common for producers, songwriters, and engineers to freely experiment with musical form, arrangements, unnatural reverb, and other sound effects. Some of the best known examples are Phil Spector's Wall of Sound production formula and Joe Meek's use of homemade electronics for acts like the Tornados.) In 1966, the release of influential albums such as the Beach Boys' Pet Sounds and Frank Zappa's Freak Out! inspired many rock-based groups to incorporate unconventional approaches and recording studio techniques into their music. In August of the same year, the Beatles released the influential album Revolver, which further advanced contemporary production techniques, particularly on its closing track, "Tomorrow Never Knows". By 1967, the innovations of Pet Sounds and Freak Out! influenced the Beatles' Sgt. Pepper's Lonely Hearts Club Band, which contributed heavily to the wider popularization of advanced unconventional studio techniques in popular music. (Note: The Beach Boys followed Pet Sounds several months later with the single "Good Vibrations" (1966), credited as a milestone in the development of rock music and, with the Beatles' Revolver, a prime proponent in revolutionizing rock music from live concert performances to studio productions which could only exist on record.)

==== West Coast: California's L.A. and San Francisco Scene ====
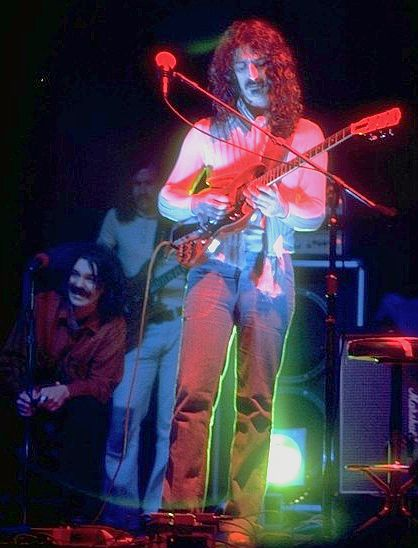
Frank Zappa with Captain Beefheart, seated left, during a 1975 concert

In the opinion of Stuart Rosenberg, the first "noteworthy" experimental rock group was the Mothers of Invention, formed in 1964 by composer Frank Zappa. Greene recognises the group's debut album, Freak Out!, as marking the "emergence of the 'avant-rock' studio album." Also, Rosenberg described the Velvet Underground as "even further out of step with popular culture than the early recordings of the Mothers of Invention". (Note: According to Clash Music, the group's debut March 1967 album The Velvet Underground & Nico was the first art rock record.) According to author Kelly Fisher Lowe, Zappa "set the tone" for experimental rock with the way he incorporated "countertextural aspects [...] calling attention to the very recordedness of the album." His 1968 album We're Only in It for the Money, was praised by Barret Hansen in an April 1968 review for Rolling Stone, as the most "advanced" rock album released up to that date, though not necessarily the "best". In 1969, the release of Captain Beefheart's album Trout Mask Replica, produced by and released on Frank Zappa's record label Straight Records, marked a foundational moment for experimental rock music, with the Guardian stating, "Trout Mask Replica remains the standard by which almost all experimental rock music is judged, its reputation as a fearsomely difficult listen undimmed by the passing of time or its influence." Pitchfork stated that the album "set an unmatched standard for avant-rock". Other West Coast underground experimental rock acts included Vito & the Hands, the Gas Company, the Inrhodes, the Urban Renewal Project, the United States of America, the Ethix and Fifty Foot Hose. Among the most influential were the Residents, formed in San Francisco in 1969. Commercially successful groups such as the Doors would also incorporate avant-garde influences into their music, their song "Not to Touch the Earth" (1968), is what critic Mick Wall described as "nearly four minutes of avant-rock."

==== Across the world ====
By the mid-to late 1960s, the rise of San Francisco's psychedelic rock scene led to the wider popularization of psychedelia and psychoactive drugs like LSD, across the United States, inspiring bands to explore more experimental approaches to rock music. Subsequently, genres such as art rock, progressive rock, and later art pop would emerge during this period. (Note: Martin believes: "almost everything that is interesting and creative in rock music that comes after about 1970 is influenced one way or another by progressive rock". Specific influences on rock musicians were: improvement in musicianship, broad eclecticism, utopianism, romanticism, and a commitment to experimentation.) In Canada, Nihilist Spasm Band formed as a self-described "noise" band, while in Texas, Red Krayola emerged, with Pitchfork later retrospectively labelling them "likely the most experimental band of the 1960s". In Brazil, Os Mutantes formed as part of the Tropicália movement.

=== Early 1970s ===
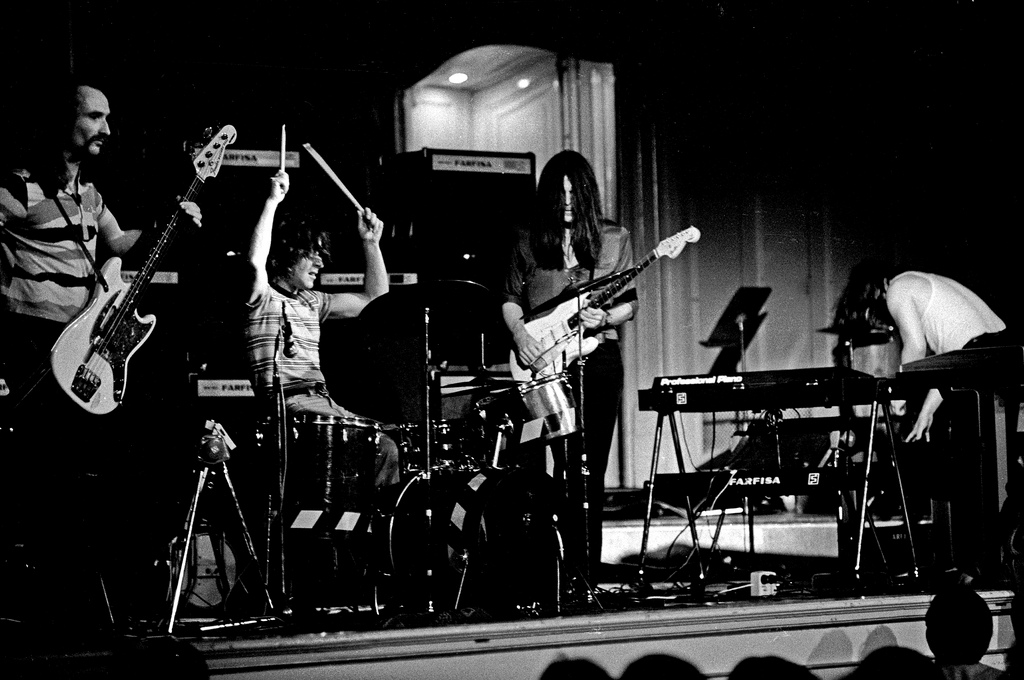
German krautrock band CAN performing in der Musikhalle Hamburg in 1972

By the late 1960s to early 1970s, experimental rock music further proliferated across the world with the emergence of scenes that drew influence from American and British avant-garde rock bands. Germany's krautrock scene, partly born out of the student movements of 1968, and originally centered on Kommune 1, took form as German youth sought a unique countercultural identity distinct from the country's past traditions, which ultimately led to bands developing a form of experimental rock that rejected formal rock conventions, and was primarily inspired by minimalism, avant-garde, and contemporary classical composers such as Stockhausen, as well as American experimental rock artists like the Velvet Underground and Frank Zappa. Prominent acts such as Can, Faust, Neu!, Amon Düül II, Ash Ra Tempel, Kraftwerk, Tangerine Dream, and Popol Vuh merged elements of psychedelic rock with electronic music, funk, and jazz improvisation.

Can's 1971 album Tago Mago has been described as a "genre-defining" work of experimental rock music. British magazine Uncut cited the album along with Ege Bamyasi (1972) and Future Days (1973) as "experimental rock touchstones".

In Czechoslovakia while under the Soviet Union, the Prague Underground led by the Plastic People of the Universe and underground samizdat writer Egon Bondy made experimental rock music as inspired by then banned US artists such as the Velvet Underground and Frank Zappa. The Plastic People of the Universe were later arrested, and their trial sparked the creation of Charter 77, the movement which contributed to the later Velvet Revolution that ended the regime.

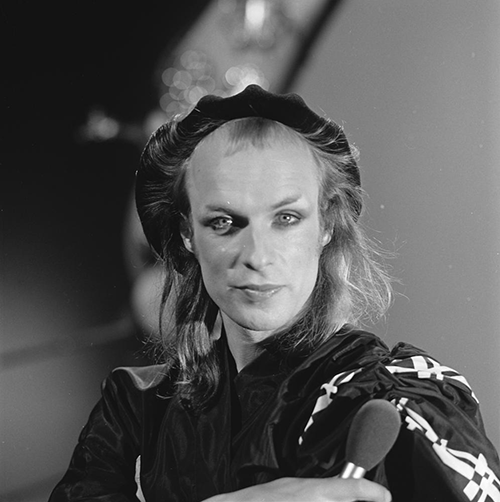
Brian Eno on AVRO's television program TopPop, April 1974

In England, art rock band Roxy Music emerged. Singer Bryan Ferry briefly attended art school, while keyboardist Brian Eno drew influences from Germany's krautrock scene, alongside frequent collaborator David Bowie, with Eno releasing influential debut and sophomore albums, which were followed by Bowie's Berlin Trilogy in the late 1970s. According to Bandcamp Daily, English group Henry Cow who spearheaded the Rock in Opposition movement are "essential to the last 60 years of avant-garde and experimental rock".

In America, New York City artists such as Television, Patti Smith, Richard Hell and the Voidoids, and Talking Heads emerged from the early NYC punk rock scene, centered on local venues such as CBGB and Max's Kansas City, with their music blending the raw energy of early punk with influences from the local art and avant-garde scenes, which contributed to the development of "art punk". Other contemporaneous developments included the early Cleveland punk scene spearheaded by Mirrors, Electric Eels, the Styrenes, Rocket from the Tombs and later Pere Ubu, as well as Half Japanese, formed by brothers Jad and David Fair in Uniontown, Maryland in 1974.

=== Late 1970s–1990s ===
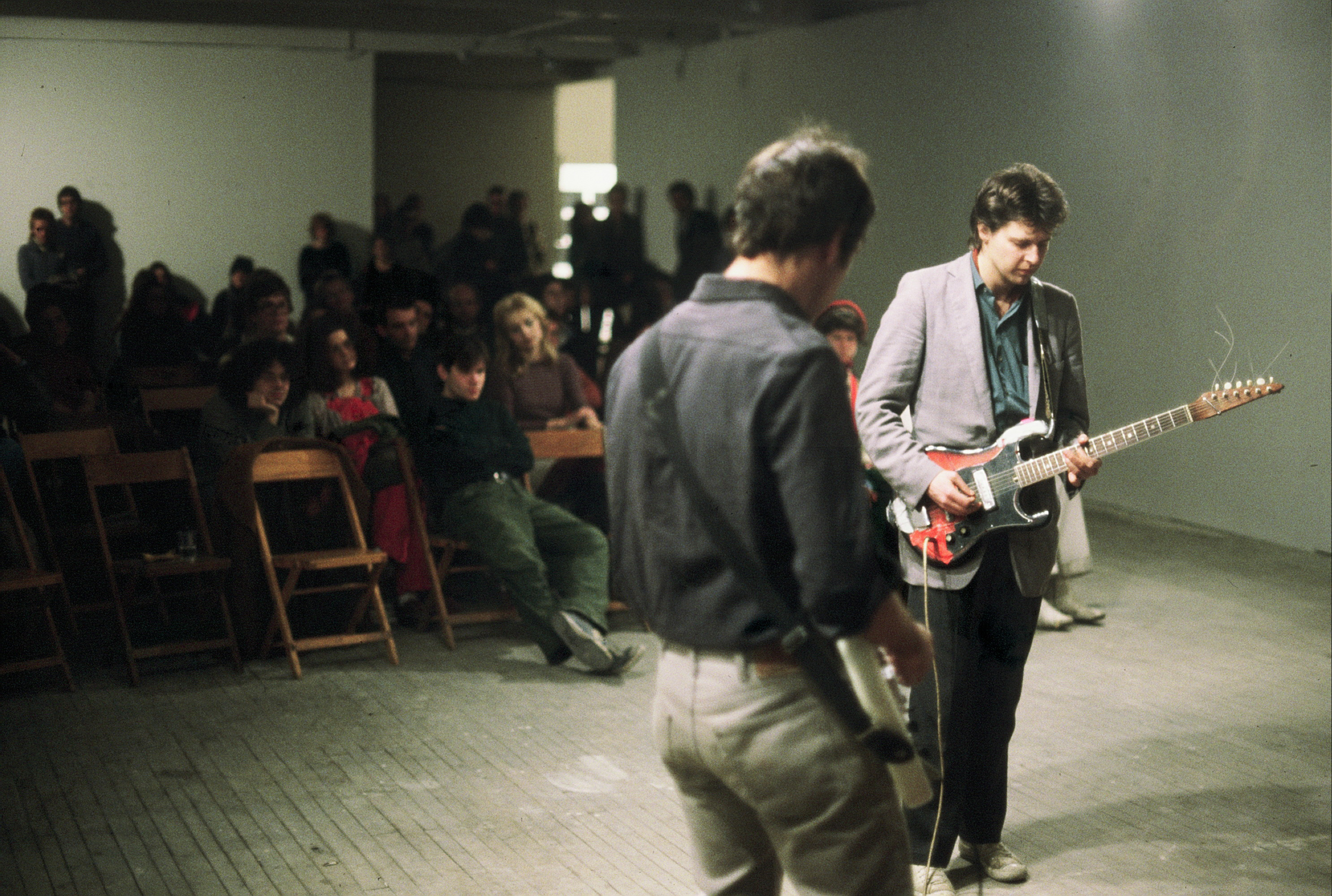
Glenn Branca performing in New York in the early 1980s

By the late 1970s, several developments emerged influenced by the wider punk rock movement. In England this was represented by the burgeoning post-punk movement. Similarly to Germany's krautrock scene, artists eschewed rock conventionality, in favor of influences indebted to music genres such as funk, dub, and avant-garde jazz. Experimental rock acts during this period included This Heat, Public Image Ltd, and the Fall. In America, the New York no wave scene consisted of experimental rock bands that rejected the commerciality of new wave, and who, according to Village Voice writer Steve Anderson, pursued an abrasive reductionism which "undermined the power and mystique of a rock vanguard by depriving it of a tradition to react against." Anderson claims that the no wave scene represented "New York's last stylistically cohesive avant-rock movement." The industrial music scene led to acts such as Einstürzende Neubauten, Cabaret Voltaire, Nurse with Wound and Throbbing Gristle.

In Japan, Osaka, Kobe, Kyoto and other parts of the Kansai region developed a regionalized extension of New York City no wave known as "Kansai no wave". Artists included Aunt Sally, INU, Hide, Jojo Hiroshige and SS. This scene led to the emergence of the Japanoise scene led by artists such as Keiji Haino, Boredoms, Fushitsusha, the Gerogerigegege, Ruins and Hanatarash, which helped develop styles of contemporary noise music such as harsh noise.

By the 1980s, notable broader experimental rock groups included acts such as Material, Swans, the Work, Last Exit, Sonic Youth, John Zorn and Massacre. Pitchfork later described acts such as the Birthday Party as "avant-rock icons." According to journalist David Stubbs, "no other major rock group [...] has done as much to try to bridge the gap between rock and the avant garde" as Sonic Youth, who drew on improvisation and noise as well as the sound of the Velvet Underground.

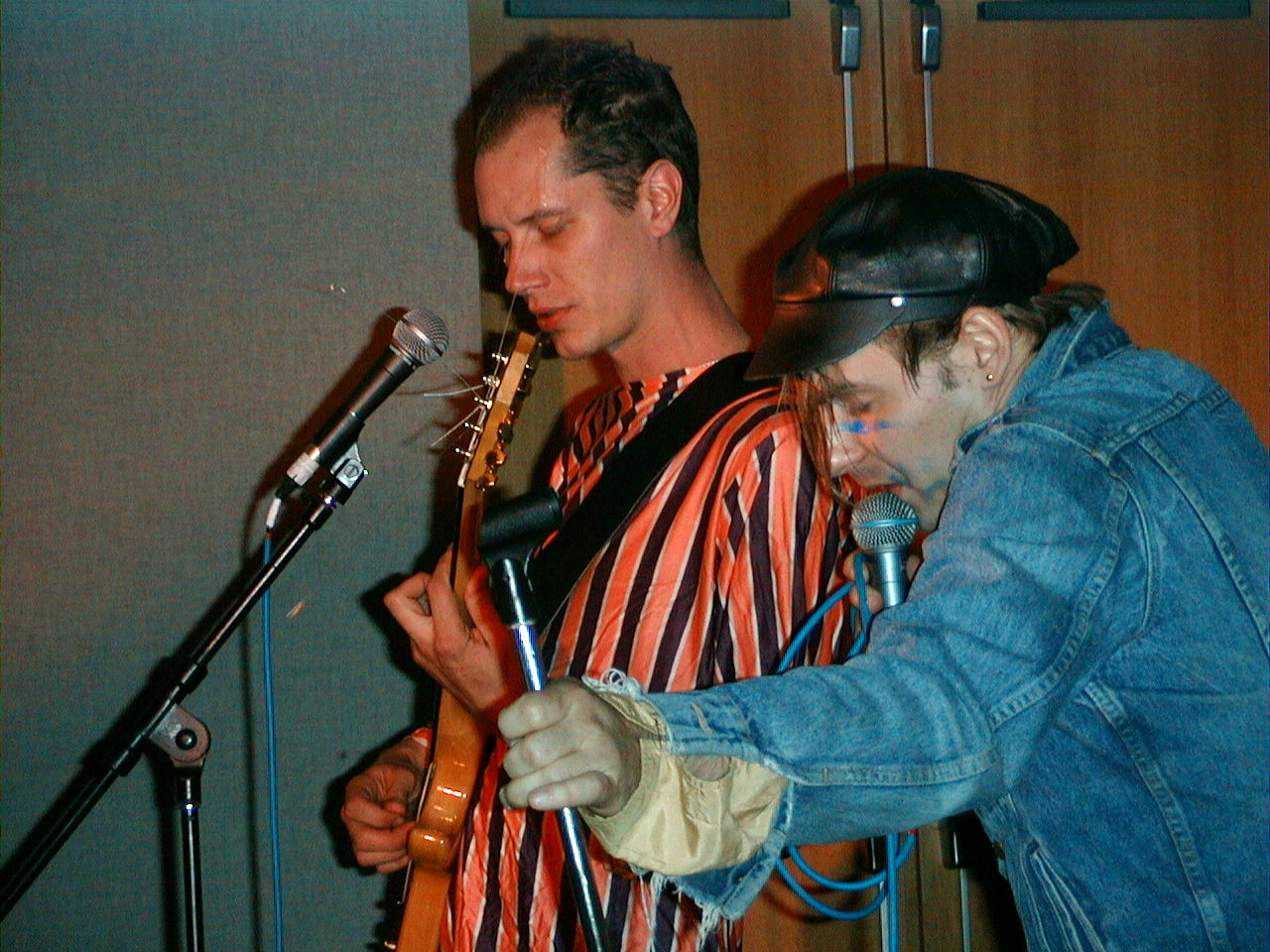
U.S. Maple performing in September, 1999

Subsequently, the innovation of the British shoegaze movement was described by Guardian writer Jude Rogers as being better received outside the United Kingdom, stating: "there wasn't a shoegazing backlash in America; the music was seen as part of an ongoing heritage of experimental rock, which fed into later genres like space-rock and post-rock." During the 1990s, as a reaction against traditional rock music formula, post-rock artists combined standard rock instrumentation with electronics and influences from various styles such as ambient music, IDM, krautrock, minimalism, and jazz. Other developments in experimental rock included brutal prog, noise, and math rock influenced artists such as U.S. Maple, Lightning Bolt, Laddio Bolocko, Storm & Stress, and Arab on Radar. Long-lasting American avant-rock bands such as the Residents and Red Krayola continued to release music into the 21st century.

=== 2000s–2020s ===
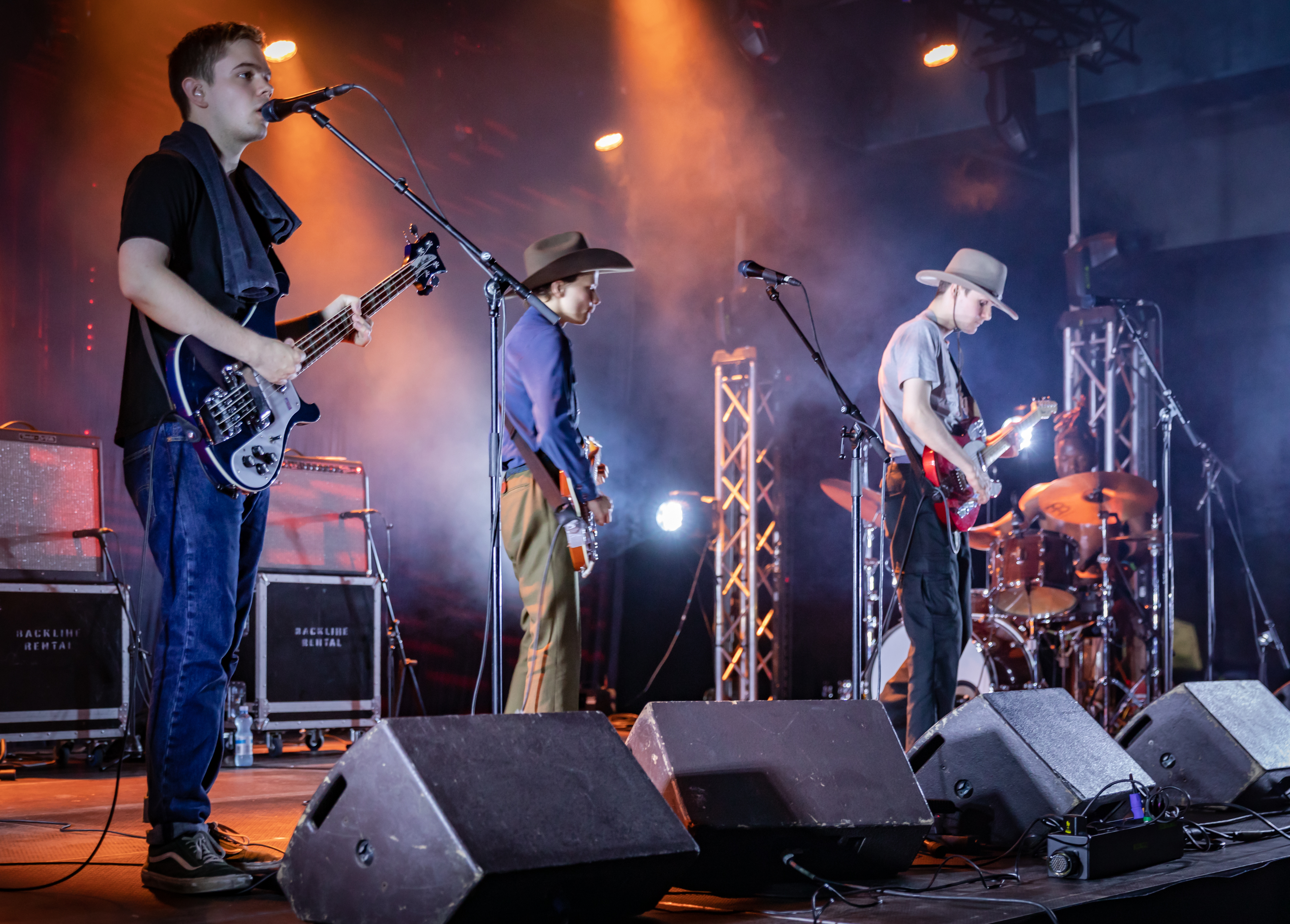
Black Midi performing at Sideways Festival 2019 in Helsinki, Finland

In 2015, The Quietus' Bryan Brussee contemporarily noted uncertainty with the term "experimental rock", and that "it seem[ed] like every rock band [...] ha[d] some kind of post-, kraut-, psych-, or noise- prefixed to their genre." In 2020, the Tokyo Weekender labelled math rock "one of the most prominent pillars of progressive and experimental rock music for the best part of three decades."

By the late 2010s to early 2020s, Windmill scene emerged in Brixton, London, drawing from post-punk and centered on the venue the Windmill. Artists in the scene described as "experimental rock" include Black Midi.

== See also ==
- Postmodern music
- Experimental music
- Industrial music

== Bibliography ==
- Ashby, Arved Mark, ed. (2004). The Pleasure of Modernist Music: Listening, Meaning, Intention, Ideology. Boydell & Brewer. ISBN 978-1-58046-143-6.
- Birnbaum, Larry (2013). Before Elvis: The Prehistory of Rock 'n' Roll. Lanham, Maryland: Scarecrow Press. ISBN 978-0-8108-8638-4.
- Blake, Andrew (2009). "Recording practices and the role of the producer". In Cook, Nicholas; Clarke, Eric; Leech-Wilkinson, Daniel (eds.). The Cambridge Companion to Recorded Music. Cambridge University Press. ISBN 978-1-139-82796-6.
- Bogdanov, Vladimir, ed. (2001). All Music Guide to Electronica. Backbeat Books. ISBN 0-87930-628-9.
- Corcelli, John (2016). Frank Zappa FAQ: All That's Left to Know About the Father of Invention. Hal Leonard. ISBN 978-1-61713-673-3.
- Edmondson, Jacqueline, ed. (2013). Music in American Life: An Encyclopedia of the Songs, Styles, Stars, and Stories that Shaped our Culture. ABC-CLIO. ISBN 978-0-313-39348-8.
- Faulk, Barry J. (2016). British Rock Modernism, 1967-1977: The Story of Music Hall in Rock. Routledge. ISBN 978-1-317-17152-2.
- Gillett, Charlie (1984). The Sound of the City: The Rise of Rock and Roll. Perseus Books Group. ISBN 978-0-306-80683-4.
- Greene, Doyle (2016). Rock, Counterculture and the Avant-Garde, 1966-1970: How the Beatles, Frank Zappa and the Velvet Underground Defined an Era. McFarland. ISBN 978-1-4766-2403-7.
- Lowe, Kelly Fisher (2007). The Words and Music of Frank Zappa. U of Nebraska Press. ISBN 978-0-8032-6005-4.
- Hegarty, Paul; Halliwell, Martin (2011), Beyond and Before: Progressive Rock Since the 1960s, New York: The Continuum International Publishing Group, ISBN 978-0-8264-2332-0
- Julien, Olivier (2008). "'A lucky man who made the grade': Sgt. Pepper and the rise of a phonographic tradition in twentieth-century popular music". In Julien, Olivier (ed.). Sgt. Pepper and the Beatles: It Was Forty Years Ago Today. Ashgate. ISBN 978-0-7546-6708-7.
- Lawrence, Tim (2009). Hold On to Your Dreams: Arthur Russell and the Downtown Music Scene, 1973-1992. Duke University Press. p. 344. ISBN 978-0-8223-9085-5.
- MacDonald, Ian (2005). Revolution in the Head: The Beatles' Records and the Sixties (2nd rev. ed.). Chicago: Chicago Review Press. ISBN 978-1-55652-733-3.
- Martin, Bill (1998). Listening to the Future: The Time of Progressive Rock, 1968–1978. Open Court. ISBN 0-8126-9368-X.
- Martin, Bill (2015). Avant Rock: Experimental Music from the Beatles to Bjork. Open Court Publishing Company. ISBN 978-0-8126-9939-5.
- Morse, Erik (2009). Spacemen 3 And The Birth Of Spiritualized. Omnibus Press. ISBN 978-0-85712-104-2.
- Wall, Mick (October 30, 2014). Love Becomes a Funeral Pyre. UK: Hachette. ISBN 978-1409151258.
- Reynolds, Simon (2005). Rip It Up and Start Again: Postpunk 1978–1984. London: Faber and Faber. ISBN 978-0-571-21570-6.
- Rosenberg, Stuart (2009). Rock and Roll and the American Landscape: The Birth of an Industry and the Expansion of the Popular Culture, 1955-1969. iUniverse. ISBN 978-1-4401-6458-3.
- Schaffner, Nicholas (1992). Saucerful of Secrets: The Pink Floyd Odyssey. Dell. p. 223. ISBN 978-0-385-30684-3.
- Simonelli, David (2013). Working Class Heroes: Rock Music and British Society in the 1960s and 1970s. Lanham, MD: Lexington Books. ISBN 978-0-7391-7051-9.
- Smith, Chris (2006). The Greenwood Encyclopedia of Rock History: From arenas to the underground, 1974-1980. Greenwood Press. ISBN 978-0-313-33611-9.
- Stubbs, David (2009). Fear of Music: Why People Get Rothko But Don't Get Stockhausen. John Hunt Publishing. ISBN 978-1-84694-179-5.
- Stuessy, Joe; Lipscomb, Scott David (2009). Rock and Roll: Its History and Stylistic Development. Prentice Hall Higher Education. ISBN 978-0-13-601068-5.
- Unterberger, Richie (1998). Unknown Legends of Rock 'n' Roll. Hal Leonard Corporation. ISBN 978-1-61774-469-3.
- Frith, Simon (1989). Facing the Music: A Pantheon Guide to Popular Culture. Pantheon Books. ISBN 0-394-55849-9.
- Gittins, Ian (2004). Talking Heads: Once in a Lifetime : the Stories Behind Every Song. Hal Leonard. ISBN 978-0-634-08033-3.
- MacDonald, Ian (1998). Revolution in the Head: The Beatles' Records and the Sixties. London: Pimlico. ISBN 978-0-7126-6697-8.
