= Cleveland punk =

1970s music scene in Ohio, US

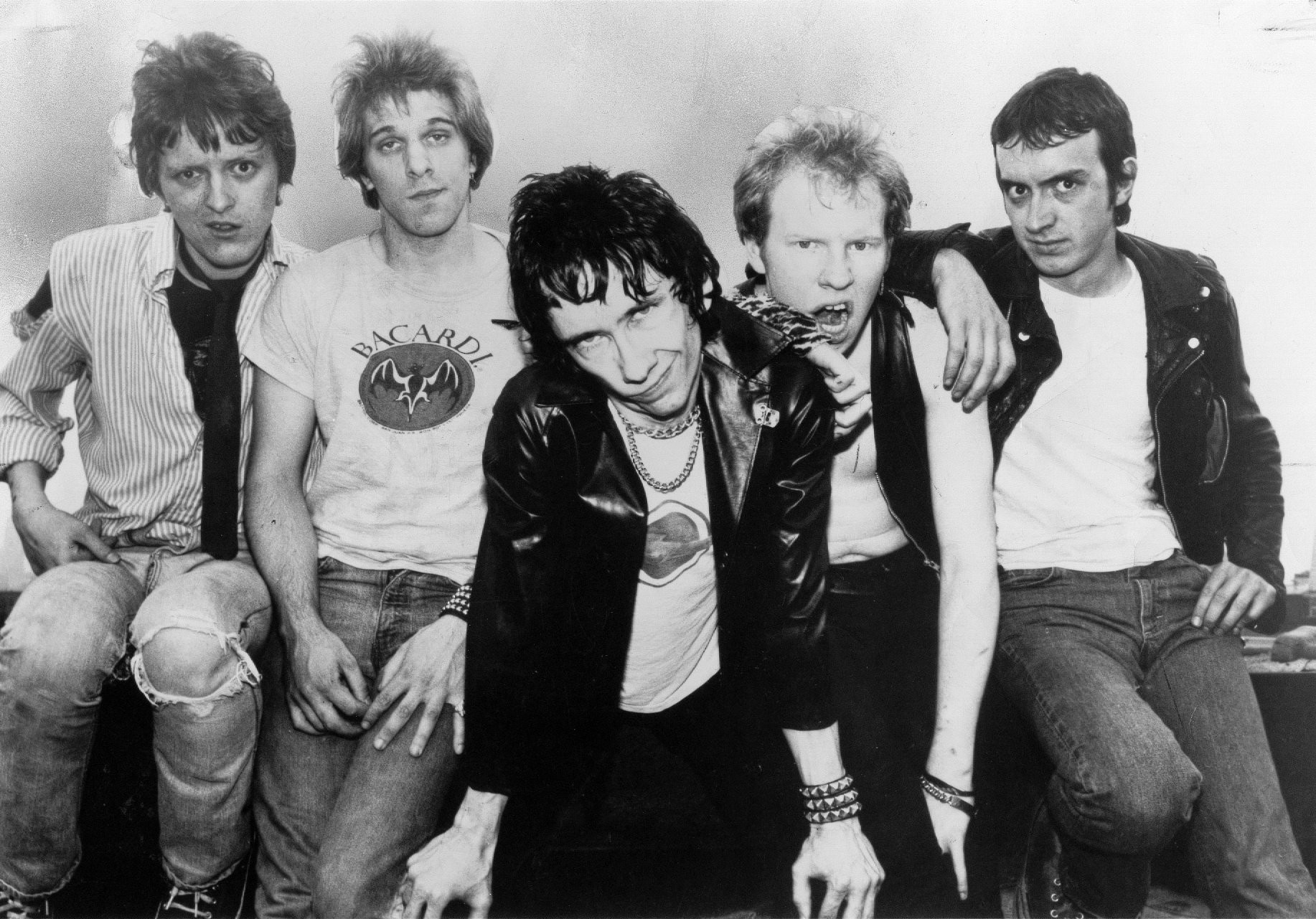
- Cleveland punk band Dead Boys in 1977.
- Other names: Cle Punk; Cleveland Scene
- Stylistic origins: Proto-punk; garage rock; experimental rock; rock and roll
- Cultural origins: 1970s, Cleveland, Ohio, United States
- Typical instruments: Electric guitar, bass guitar, drums, vocals

Other topics
- Akron Sound

Cleveland punk was a proto-punk and punk rock music scene in Cleveland, Ohio, during the 1970s. Its early bands included Mirrors, Electric Eels, the Styrenes and Rocket from the Tombs. Notable bands that emerged included Pere Ubu, the Pagans, and Dead Boys.

== Background ==
During the 1970s Cleveland earned the nickname "Bomb City U.S.A." for its organized crime and economic struggles, which were exacerbated by deindustrialization that produced the Rust Belt. The city's air and water supply were contaminated by pollution so severe that the Cuyahoga River caught on fire several times during the late 1960s.

Artists drew on Cleveland's harsh, smog-infested, industrial landscape to create jagged, chaotic, and dissonant music informed by gritty urban decay. Other influences included Ghoulardi, a popular fictional character of disc jockey Ernie Anderson, who hosted "Shock Theater," a television program that screened late-night horror films on TV-8, the CBS affiliate in Cleveland, from January 13, 1963, through December 16, 1966.

== History ==
=== 1970s–1980s ===
By the 1970s Cleveland had a thriving underground rock scene, with artists like David Thomas, who began his career in the early 1970s as a writer for the local weekly The Scene under the pseudonym 'Crocus Behemoth' and later went on to form the short-lived influential rock band Rocket from the Tombs. The scene began in the early 1970s with bands like Mirrors, Electric Eels, the Styrenes and Rocket from the Tombs, groups that combined aggressive garage rock with avant-garde experimentation, nihilism, and confrontational attitude. Bands in the scene drew influences from the Stooges, the Velvet Underground, MC5, Captain Beefheart, and free jazz as much as traditional rock and roll.

In 1974 the Cleveland scene began with the proliferation of shows headlined by bands like Mirrors, Electric Eels, the Styrenes and Rocket from the Tombs which were dubbed "Extermination Night". While influential venues included the Pirate's Cove, the Agora, Piccadilly Inn, and Viking Salon.

Around this time Cleveland legend Peter Laughner emerged as a leading force in the scene. Richie Unterberger called Laughner "the single biggest catalyst in the birth of Cleveland's alternative rock scene". A prolific guitarist and songwriter, he played in several key bands, including Cinderella Backstreet and, later, David Thomas' Pere Ubu. Laughner, who had also reportedly auditioned to replace Richard Hell in Television, organized the band's first gig outside NYC, which was played at Cleveland's Piccadilly Inn on July 24–25, 1975 and supported by Rocket from the Tombs. Some bands in the Cleveland scene like Pere Ubu, positioned themselves in opposition to the early New York punk scene. However, Laughner admired the NYC scene, hanging around prominent CBGB figures like Patti Smith, Richard Hell and Tom Verlaine during the early 1970s. Laughner's health deteriorated; his growing self-destruction and unreliability were attributed to his emulation of rock heroes like Lou Reed. Members of Pere Ubu were concerned about his unreliability, which led him to leave the band in 1976. He died on June 22, 1977, at age 24, with his death linked to extensive alcoholism and drug use.

Later bands in the Cleveland punk scene included Human Switchboard, the Wild Giraffes, the Pagans, X-X, Defnics and Broncs.

== Legacy ==
The Cleveland punk scene influenced other Ohio bands, including Devo, whose members hailed from Akron and Kent, and were part of the Akron Sound movement.

In 1975 Thomas formed the independent record label Hearpen Records as a partial document of the Cleveland scene. Terminal Records formed a few years later, became another important label in the scene.

By the late 1970s many of the original Cleveland punk bands had disbanded or transmuted into other forms. In 1975, Stiv Bators was tried out as lead singer of Rocket from the Tombs but did not remain with the band. The Dead Boys, including former Rocket from the Tombs guitarist Cheetah Chrome, moved to New York City. Electric Eels drummer, Nick Knox, went on to join the Cramps.

The Cleveland scene's lasting influence reached punk fashion as well; the Electric Eels' guitarist, John D Morton was allegedly the first punk rock musician known to wear a jacket held together by safety pins.

By the 1980s to the early 1990s the Cleveland scene grew to encompass the emerging hardcore and post-punk movements.

== See also ==
- Punk 45: Extermination Nights in the Sixth City

== Bibliography ==
- Lange, Aaron (2023). Ain’t It Fun: Peter Laughner & Proto-Punk in the Secret City. Cleveland, OH: Stone Church Press.
