= Art punk =

Experimental punk rock genre

- Stylistic origins: Punk rock; avant-garde; art rock; experimental rock
- Cultural origins: Mid-1970s, United States and United Kingdom

Regional scenes
- Brixton, London

Other topics
- Art pop; post-hardcore; post-punk; avant-rock; pub rock; progressive rock; egg punk; noise rock; art music; punk jazz

Art punk is a subgenre of punk rock influenced by art school culture in which artists go beyond the genre's rudimentary three-chord garage rock conventions, incorporating more complex song structures, esoteric influences and a more sophisticated sound and image. While retaining punk's simplicity and rawness, art punk draws more from avant-garde music, literature and abstract art than other punk subgenres, often intersecting with the more experimental branches of the post-punk scene and attracting opposing audiences to that of the angry, working-class ones that surrounded the original punk rock scene.

== Etymology ==
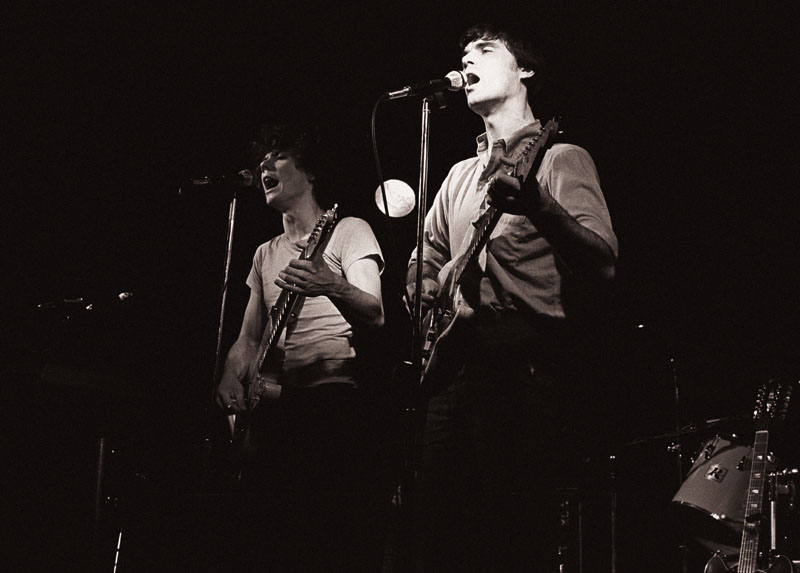
Jerry Harrison (left) and David Byrne (right) of art-punk band Talking Heads performing at Jay's Longhorn Bar in Minneapolis, 1978

On December 12, 1977, writer Stanley Mieses of Melody Maker used the term "art-punk" to describe the American band Devo. In 2004, music historian Ian Gittins noted that the term "art-punk" began to be used prominently by several music publications during the post-punk era primarily to describe artists deemed too sophisticated and out of step with punk's dogma, though some critics used it as a pejorative. Gittins stated:

In the post-punk years at the end of the 1970s, it became a lazy journalistic habit to refer to certain groups as “art-punks”. This generally meant no more than that they delivered garage rock’s adrenalin rush with a moderate degree of intelligence (i.e. they weren't Sham 69). Some fundamentalist critics even flung the term at bands as an insult, implying they weren't as “authentic” as punk's dogma: demanded. You had to “mean it, maan” as Johnny Rotten once drawled (even though, with Public Image Limited, Rotten was to later prove himself the most contrary art-punk of all).

In the rock music of the 1970s, the "art" descriptor was generally understood to mean either "aggressively avant-garde" or "pretentiously progressive". Musicologists Simon Frith and Howard Horne described the band managers of the 1970s punk bands as "the most articulate theorists of the art punk movement", with Bob Last of Fast Product identified as one of the first to apply art theory to marketing, and Tony Wilson's Factory Records described as "applying the Bauhaus principle of the same 'look' for all the company's goods". Wire's Colin Newman described art punk in 2006 as "the drug of choice of a whole generation".

== Characteristics ==
Art-punk artists often utilize angular guitar riffs, intricate rhythms, and a wide array of influences equal to that of post-punk which included but was not limited to krautrock, dub, funk, free jazz and glam. Music critic Simon Reynolds in his book, Rip It Up and Start Again, attributed the rise of avant-garde movements like art punk and post-punk in the late 1970s to British government art school grants and funding:

Especially in Britain, art schools have long functioned as a state-subsidized bohemia, where working-class youths too unruly for a life of labor mingle with slumming bourgeois kids too wayward for a middle-management career.

Author Gavin Butt writes that:

People went to art school to be in a band. That was even the principle principal reason they went […] this was because art school was a place where you could get a local authority grant, have the costs of your tuition paid for by the government, and have three years to do whatever you wanted.

Additionally, post-punk and art punk are not mutually exclusive and frequently intersect. Although, some artists such as Patti Smith have been described as "art punk" with no relation to the post-punk scene. Art punk is defined as a more avant-garde and artier form of punk music, blending poetry, literary and abstract influences and general art school culture with the genre. Post-punk bands such as Wire, Gang of Four, Pere Ubu, Delta 5 and the Raincoats have been described as "art punk" by Louder, who define art punk as "bands obsessed with the form of their music, of avoiding ‘rockist' clichés and aiming for something more avant-garde and challenging".

Art punk is often marked by well-read musicians with middle-class sensibilities, bookish lyrics, art school backgrounds, and a stripped-back fashion style that rejects punk fashion clichés (as seen with bands like Talking Heads, the Fall and Wire).

== History ==
=== Forerunners ===
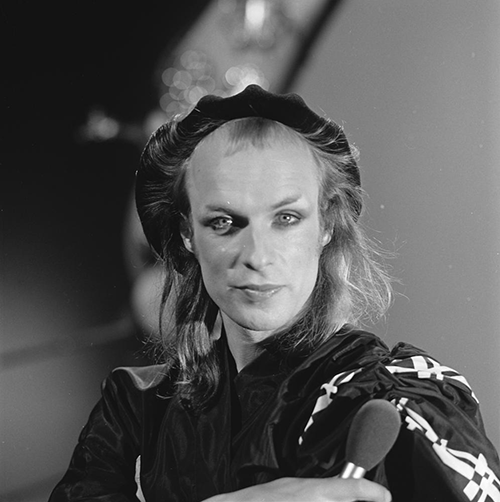
Brian Eno on AVRO's television program TopPop, April 1974

Art punk drew influences from art rock bands like the Velvet Underground. According to Pitchfork, musicians Mayo Thompson, Captain Beefheart, and Lou Reed were "the primary oracle for a generation of art punks". The publication had also stated that groups such as "the Fall, Public Image, Ltd., and the Minutemen split Beefheart's structural innovations into new branches of art-punk". Experimental rock artists such as the Monks, along with Germany's krautrock groups such as Faust and Can were also influential to the genre.

By the early 1970s, English art rock band Roxy Music emerged, singer Bryan Ferry had briefly attended art school, while keyboardist Brian Eno, drew influences from Germany's krautrock scene, alongside frequent collaborator David Bowie, who would also collaborate with Iggy Pop, on his solo album The Idiot, and released the Berlin Trilogy. Brian Eno released influential art rock albums such as Here Come the Warm Jets and Taking Tiger Mountain (By Strategy), and later produced for art punk bands like Television, Devo and Talking Heads as well as the No New York compilation album.

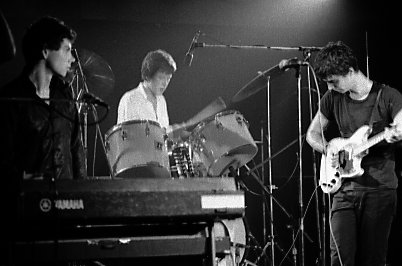
Talking Heads performing in 1978 with Harrison (left), Frantz (middle) and Byrne (right).

=== 1970s–1980s: Origins ===
During the early-to-mid 1970s, New York City artists such as Television, Patti Smith, Richard Hell and the Voidoids and Talking Heads would emerge from the burgeoning early NYC punk scene, performing at local clubs like CBGB and Max's Kansas City. Their music blended the raw energy of early punk with influences from poetry as well as local art and avant-garde scenes, contrasting with what would become the standard rudimentary punk sound associated with British pub rock and American acts like the New York Dolls, Heartbreakers, Dead Boys and Ramones.

Talking Heads, originally known as "the Artistics," formed while studying at the Rhode Island School of Design in 1975. In Ohio, bands such as Devo, Mirrors, the Styrenes, Electric Eels, and Pere Ubu would form, blending garage rock and proto-punk with avant-garde experimentation. Additionally, Oklahoma band Debris' who merged the Stooges with Beefheart, acid rock and early Roxy Music have been described as a "proto-art-punk band". Other early art punk groups were often formed at art schools or composed primarily of musicians who had studied at art schools.

In 1975, Patti Smith released her debut album Horses produced by John Cale previously of the Velvet Underground. The album was retroactively described by AllMusic as "essentially the first art punk album". Subsequently, retrospective reviews cited Television’s debut album Marquee Moon as "jazzy art punk," and Talking Heads as graduating from an "art punk jangle to maximalist post-modern funk orchestra".

In the UK, the post-punk scene often intersected with art punk, bands such as the Fall, the Raincoats, Public Image Ltd and Magazine being attributed the label interchangeably with post-punk. Author Gavin Butt linked art education as a "really important part of the cultural ecology" of Leeds-based bands such as Delta 5, Gang of Four, Scritti Politti and the Mekons.

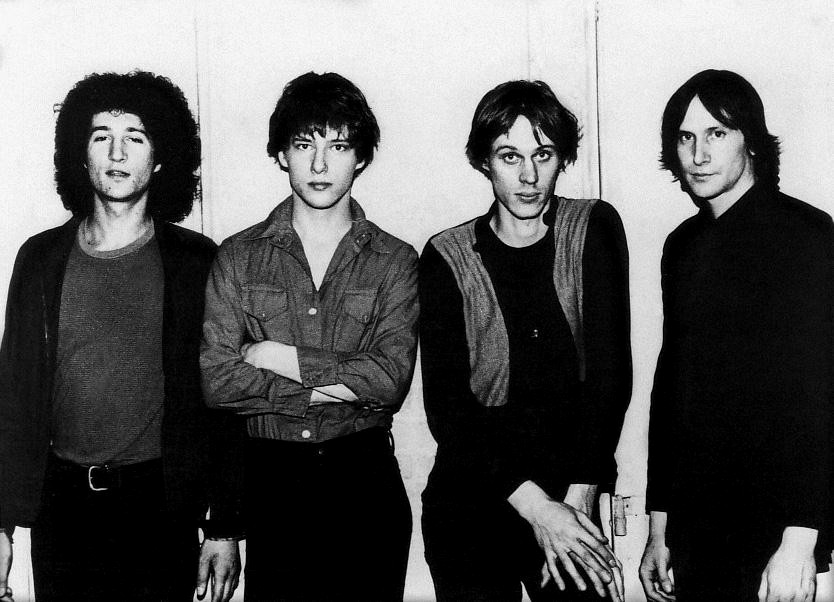
New York City punk pioneers Television were later labeled a pioneering art punk band

However, Simon Reynolds cites that not all bands in the British post-punk scene had gone to art school:

Some accused these experimentalists of merely lapsing back into the art rock elitism that punk originally aimed to destroy […] Of course, not everyone in postpunk attended art school, or even college. Self-educated […] figures like John Lydon or Mark E. Smith […] fit the syndrome of the anti-intellectual intellectual.

By late 1977, English band Wire released their debut album Pink Flag, marking the start of a string of highly influential records—including Chairs Missing and 154 that would go on to define and lay the groundwork for art punk and broader alternative music. Other bands such as Swell Maps whose debut single "Read About Seymour" gained cult success after being played on the John Peel show, blended DIY sensibilities with more experimental and artier influences. Their albums A Trip to Marineville and Jane from Occupied Europe, later became staple art punk releases.

By the early 1980s, bands such as the Feelies came to further define the genre, with their debut album "Crazy Rhythms" being described as "oddball art punk". Followed by, Kansas band the Embarrassment described as "Midwest art-punk heroes", who blended the nerdy sound of Jonathan Richman's The Modern Lovers with the quirky, cerebral style of Talking Heads. Audiences noted that "they looked more like nerds than punks", resulting in the band being retrospectively assessed as a template for geek rock. In England, the band Cardiacs made avant-prog and post-punk influenced art rock, with the Guardian describing the song R.E.S. as an "art-punk Bohemian Rhapsody".

Subsequently, groups such as the Slits, Alternative TV, Au Pairs, the Flying Lizards and the Pop Group would further develop the art punk sound, crafting songs that blended abstract lyrics and avant-garde music with punk and post-punk elements, whilst bands such as Half Japanese, the Birthday Party, and Blurt incorporated a noise rock influence. Later, the New York no wave scene also saw brief intersections with art punk, evinced by artists like James Chance and the Contortions, Rosa Yemen, Mars, Theoretical Girls, the Static, A Band, Teenage Jesus and the Jerks, and most notably Sonic Youth.

Californian punk bands such as MX-80 Sound and the Minutemen took influences from jazz, blending intricate rhythms, and unconventional song structures to create a more experimental and cerebral form of punk.

The scene also took form internationally, Anna Szemere traces the beginnings of the Hungarian art-punk subculture to 1978, when punk band the Spions performed three concerts which drew on conceptualist performance art and Antonin Artaud's Theatre of Cruelty, with neo-avant-garde/anarchist manifestos handed out to the audience.

=== Late 1980s–1990s ===
In Ireland, the band Stump drew influence from Captain Beefheart and Pere Ubu further developing the sound of art punk into the late '80s, as they were featured on the NME's infamous C86 cassette compilation, alongside other art punk groups such as the Manchester-based band bIG*fLAME.

By the late 1980s to early 1990s, Scottish bands like Country Teasers and Dog Faced Hermans emerged from the scene, with the latter forming in art school. They continued the legacy of experimental and art-driven punk, though they were preceded by the Fire Engines a few years earlier. Subsequently, American band Thinking Fellers Union Local 282 blended the sound of experimental art punk with that of indie rock.

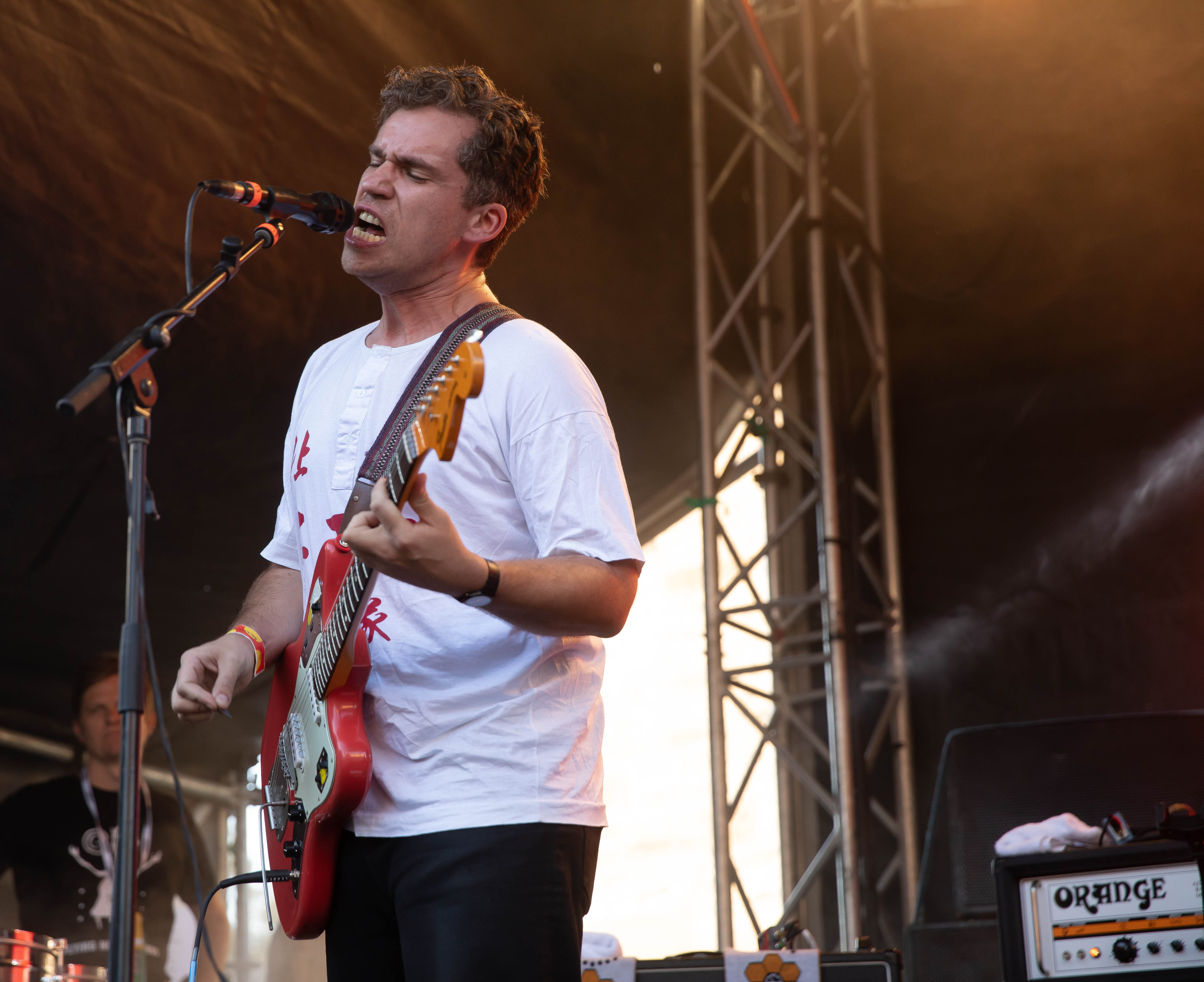
The Guardian described Parquet Courts as "agitated art-punk".

=== 2000s–2010s ===
In the early 2000s, the post-punk revival scene briefly revived the art punk sound with bands like the Rapture, and the Yeah Yeah Yeahs, the latter being labeled by the Guardian as "New York's favourite art-punk rockers".

During the 2010s, Canadian groups such as Preoccupations, Ought and Women, alongside American bands like Protomartyr and Parquet Courts. While Australian band Tropical Fuck Storm, Danish band Iceage and Ireland's Gilla Band continued to develop the art-punk sound. Additionally, the egg punk scene pioneered by Indiana-based punk trio the Coneheads, and later proliferated by groups like Uranium Club and Snõõper who incorporated art-punk elements.

By the late 2010s and early 2020s, a new wave of UK and Irish post-punk bands began to gain popularity. Originally emerging out of Brixton's Windmill scene, terms such as "crank wave" and "post-Brexit new wave" were used to describe these bands, who blended the more experimental sides of post-punk with post-rock, no wave and other art-based influences, some of these bands include Squid, Parquet Courts, Dry Cleaning, Fat White Family, Shame, Black Country, New Road, Idles and Yard Act.

== See also ==
- List of art punk bands
- Art music
- Art pop
- Avant-garde music
- Postmodern music

== Bibliography ==
- Frith, Simon (1989). Facing the Music: A Pantheon Guide to Popular Culture. Pantheon Books. ISBN 0-394-55849-9.
- Gittins, Ian (2004). Talking Heads: Once in a Lifetime : the Stories Behind Every Song. Hal Leonard. ISBN 978-0-634-08033-3.
- MacDonald, Ian (1998). Revolution in the Head: The Beatles' Records and the Sixties. London: Pimlico. ISBN 978-0-7126-6697-8.
- Heylin, Clinton (2007). Babylon's Burning: From Punk to Grunge. Canongate Books Ltd. ISBN 978-1841958798.
