= John D Morton =

American musician (born 1953)

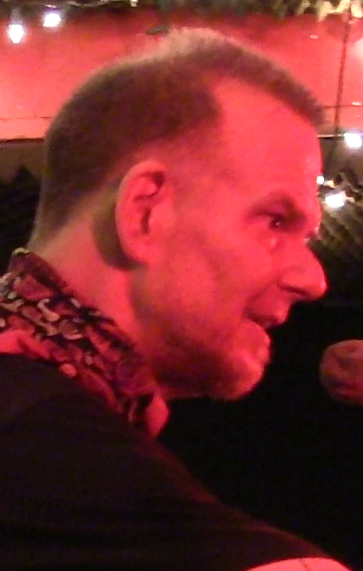
- Morton playing with X_____X at the Cake Shop in New York City

Background information
- Born: March 27, 1953 (age 73)
- Origin: Lakewood, Ohio, U.S.
- Genres: Punk rock; hardcore punk; noise rock; avant-garde
- Website: mortonia.com

John D Morton (born March 27, 1953) is an American musician born in the Cleveland suburb of Lakewood, Ohio, best known as the leader and founder of protopunk band electric eels in 1972.

== Early life ==
Growing up in and around Cleveland, John Morton played in bands during school while simultaneously getting into Beat Generation authors such as William S. Burroughs, Jack Kerouac and others as well as art thru films like Lust For Life, A Bucket of Blood, and other avenues. "Being an artist seemed like a way-viable means to get away with a whole lot of societal misbehaving."

Morton wore a jean jacket held together by safety pins as early as 1971, years before the use of safety pins became a widespread part of punk fashion. The use of safety pins in clothing and piercings was later popularized by artists such as Richard Hell, the Sex Pistols and others during the punk rock explosion of the late 70's. It was a jacket that Morton had admired a few years prior on his friend and mentor, Royce Dendler, an assistant professor at Oberlin College, whom Morton met when he was 14 years of age. Morton later visited Dendler while he was attending SVA and Dendler was also living in New York at the time. Upon inquiring as to the jacket's current whereabouts, Dendler answered by pointing to the doormat below them. Morton offered to replace the doormat and asked if he could have the jacket even though it was now tattered, in need of much repair. Morton subsequently repaired the jacket using safety pins to make it wearable and liked the look so much that he gleefully added even more safety pins. It's also been said that Morton wrote the lyrics to one of his earliest songs, Mr. Crab, after Dendler "walked him around New York and told him to write them." He recorded the song a few weeks later in September 1972 and it was eventually released in 1997 on the Those Were Different Times 3x10" vinyl set on Scat Records credited to The Styrenes.

Also around that time, he met Peter Laughner at Disc Records' Westgate store, where Laughner clerked after school, when Morton ordered about half of the ESP-Disk jazz catalogue from him. Laughner's interest was piqued by this esoteric taste in music, as well as by Morton's hulking appearance and peroxide blonde long hair, both at that time in Cleveland (especially) being quite unique, so he struck up a conversation. A few years later the two would both perform at the Special Extermination Night shows at the Viking Saloon. Morton appeared with electric eels, Laughner as a member of Rocket From The Tombs. Mirrors completed the bills which took place in December 1974 and January 1975.

== Electric Eels ==
The electric eels 'Agitated' 45 cover by John D Morton

John Morton founded the band electric eels in 1972. The other original members were his friends Dave E McManus and Brian McMahon. The impetus for finally becoming an actual band being after they'd been to see a Captain Beefheart and his Magic Band gig and were unimpressed enough by the support band (Youngstown's Left End) that they decided they could do better themselves. "Me and Davie, or me and Brian, or me, Brian and Davie went to see Captain Beefheart, and Left End were playing. And they were real bad. And I said that we could do better than that. We started practicing on the back porch. I played guitar and Brian played piano cause he didn't want to play guitar. We figured Davie could sing cause he didn't do anything else. We had our ideas about playing anti-music back then." The band only played out 5 times. The first two times were in Columbus, Ohio, where they'd relocated "because John thought his life in danger from a jealous husband. The rest of us just followed as usual." Their last three shows were after returning to Cleveland. A few years after the eels called it quits, Rough Trade released the band's debut, a 7" single, Agitated b/w Cyclotron, released in the UK during 1978, at the height of punk rock music attaining mainstream attention on an international level like never before. Both sides were recorded during one of the band's many rehearsals, with the original Rough Trade single release version of Agitated being put to tape on May 25, 1975.

== Ohio bands after Electric Eels ==
In late 1979, Morton formed a short lived band, "X____X. You could put anything between the X's, like "Appearing tonight, "X 'Charles Manson and the Family' X" In our short 6-month career we played out 4 times, recorded two 45s on Drome Records. We were a very tight band, not by design. Tony (Anton) Fier added a lot of professionalism with his work on the drumbo kit." A fake band photo with no actual members was also circulated and appeared on the back of one of the band's two Drome Records singles.

Johnny and the Dicks were also formed in 1979, a performance art group who performed to a pre-recorded soundtrack, including You're Full of Shit recorded with Morton and The Styrenes, another band that Morton has played with at various times over the years in Cleveland and New York (most recently on their 2010 Dymaxion US Tour of 2010). Johnny and the Dicks played gigs in DC, Buffalo and Cleveland, ultimately releasing an "album" with no record, just the cover art.

== Visual art, writing and music after leaving Ohio ==
In late 1978, Morton moved to New York with his wife at the time, the artist Michele Zalopany, also a member of "The Dicks" and seen in the fake band photo of the X____X single. Once in NY, most of his creative energies were focused on his visual art. Despite an increasing addiction to drugs and alcohol, Morton was initially very productive, exhibiting often in his own solo shows and w/ group shows such as his own curated Murder, Suicide and Junk (ABC No Rio, Winter 1980), The Real Estate Show (Delancey St., Jan. 1980), and the infamous The Times Square Show (201 W 41st, Summer 1980). Morton was one of the prime movers of Collaborative Projects, becoming the group's president in 1982.

Throughout the 80's and 90's Morton continued to focus on his visual art as well as writing, surfing, traveling and eventually overcoming his various addictions. He formed Amoeba (raft boy), "seven months after I got sober in 1994", followed a few years later by The New Fag MotherFuckers. Some of his writing has been published in the Ecstatic Peace Poetry Journal (#5 and No. 6, poems 2002), Cle Magazine (66 Dog, short fiction 1998), Psychotronic Video magazine (Sun Ra – Alien Against Manifest Destiny, article 1994).

In 2011, he participated in the Violet Times curated Foggy Notion art exhibition where he also debuted a new 3 piece musical group, The Dunking Swine of Chelsea, performing on treated electric sitar, theremin, musique concrète w/ accompaniment by violin and vocals. As of early 2013, it's been the Dunking Swine's only live appearance.

In 2012 Morton played on the sessions for two Scarcity of Tanks albums and performed as part of the group at a show in Brooklyn, NY.

He continues making art and music, as he has always done.

== Selected discography ==
- electric eels Agitated 45 – Rough Trade (1978)
- electric eels God Says Fuck You CD – Homestead (1991)
- electric eels The Eyeball of Hell 2xLP – Scat (2001)
- X__X 45 A 45 – Drome (1979)
- X__X 45 No Nonsense 45 – Drome (1980)
- Amoeba (Raft Boy) Bad Fuggum From The Mysterium CD – Smog Veil Records (2002)
- X__X LP – X STICKY FINGERS X LP – Ektro Records (2014)
- X__X Albert Ayler's Ghosts live at the Yellow Ghetto EP CD – Smog Veil Records (2015)
- X__X 45 Not Now, No Way – My Mind's Eye Records (2018)

== Selected art exhibitions ==
2012

- 'Someday All The Adults Will Die' Punk Graphics 1971–1984, Group Exhibition, Hayward Gallery, London, UK

2011

- Foggy Notion, Group Exhibition, Live With Animals Gallery, Brooklyn, NY

2009

- Looking at Music: Side Two, Group Exhibition, Museum of Modern Art, New York, NY

2008

- Word Falling – Photo Falling, One-Person Photography and Art Installation The Word & Image Gallery, Treadwell, NY

2001

- Esta Es Tu Casa Vicenta, Bienal Alternative Group Exhibition, Havana, Cuba.

2000

- Yuma Peligroso, Aglutinador Space, Havana, Cuba. A one-person exhibition concerning an ex-pat's life in Cuba.

1980

- Murder, Suicide and Junk, ABC No Rio Gallery, NYC
- The Times Square Show, Times Square, NYC
- A Real Estate Show, Delancey Street, NYC
