= X X (band) =

X Blank X
- Origin: Cleveland, Ohio, U.S.
- Genres: Punk rock; avant-garde
- Years active: 1978, 2014-present
- Labels: Drome; Ektro; Smog Veil; My Mind's Eye
- Spinoff of: Electric Eels
- Members: John D Morton; Andrew Klimeyk; Craig Willis Bell; Weasel Walter; Osvaldo Rodriguez; Gary Siperko; Markymoon
- Past members: Jim Ellis; Michael J. Weldon; Dave E. McManus; Anton Fier; Matthew Albert Harris; Lamont Thomas
- Website: x--x.co.uk

X_______X (pronounced "ex blank ex") was a no wave band formed in 1978 by Cleveland musician and artist John D Morton. Morton is perhaps best known as the leader and founder of protopunk band Electric Eels. Original members of X_______X were Morton on lead guitar & vocals, Anton Fier (née Tony Fier) on drums, Jim Ellis on bass, and Andrew Klimeyk on rhythm guitar and vocals.

== Overview ==
The name X_______X was designed to be mutable—a pictogram—to mean whatever one wanted at any given moment. Mutations included Ex Blank Ex, X Charlie Manson and the Family X, and for their archival vinyl album release in 2014, X The Rolling Stones X. It is Morton's Dada-esque tendencies that lie behind the decision to name the band something that is so malleable and, therefore, so difficult to search for on the internet. "This artistic antagonism, inspired by an affinity for the Dadaist movement, has been at the heart of Mr. Morton's work — both as a musician and a visual artist — for the better part of four decades.". Subsequent to this release, the band has been playing shows since with Morton (vocals/guitar) and Klemyk (vocals/guitar) joined by Craig Bell (bass) and Matthew Harris (percussion). A post-reunion album, Albert Ayler's Ghosts live at the Yellow Ghetto, was released in November 2015 by Smog Veil Records.

X_______X lasted only six months in their original incarnation. The band was formed at Morton's 25th birthday party. Morton, knowing he would be shortly moving to NYC said, "Hey! Let's form a band that last six months!" Attendees, Jim Ellis and Andrew Klimeyk were recruited on the spot. The first infusion included Mirror's drummer Michael J. Weldon and electric eels singer Dave E. McManus. After Dave and Michael quit, Anton (who suggested to name the band "Golden Palominos"—a name that was summarily rejected by Morton) was conscripted and Morton took over on vocals: "It made me a better musician to sing and play guitar at the same time . . . I couldn't be looking at my fingers all the time. I had to look at the mic!"

In its short 6-month career the band played out 4 times and, in this brief lifespan, provided Cleveland with "a smart and muscular take on no wave", and recorded two 45s released on Drome Records. A fake band photo with no actual members (including Morton's wife at the time, Michele Zalopany) was also circulated and appeared on the back of one of the band's two Drome Records singles.

== Reviews, praise, and notability ==
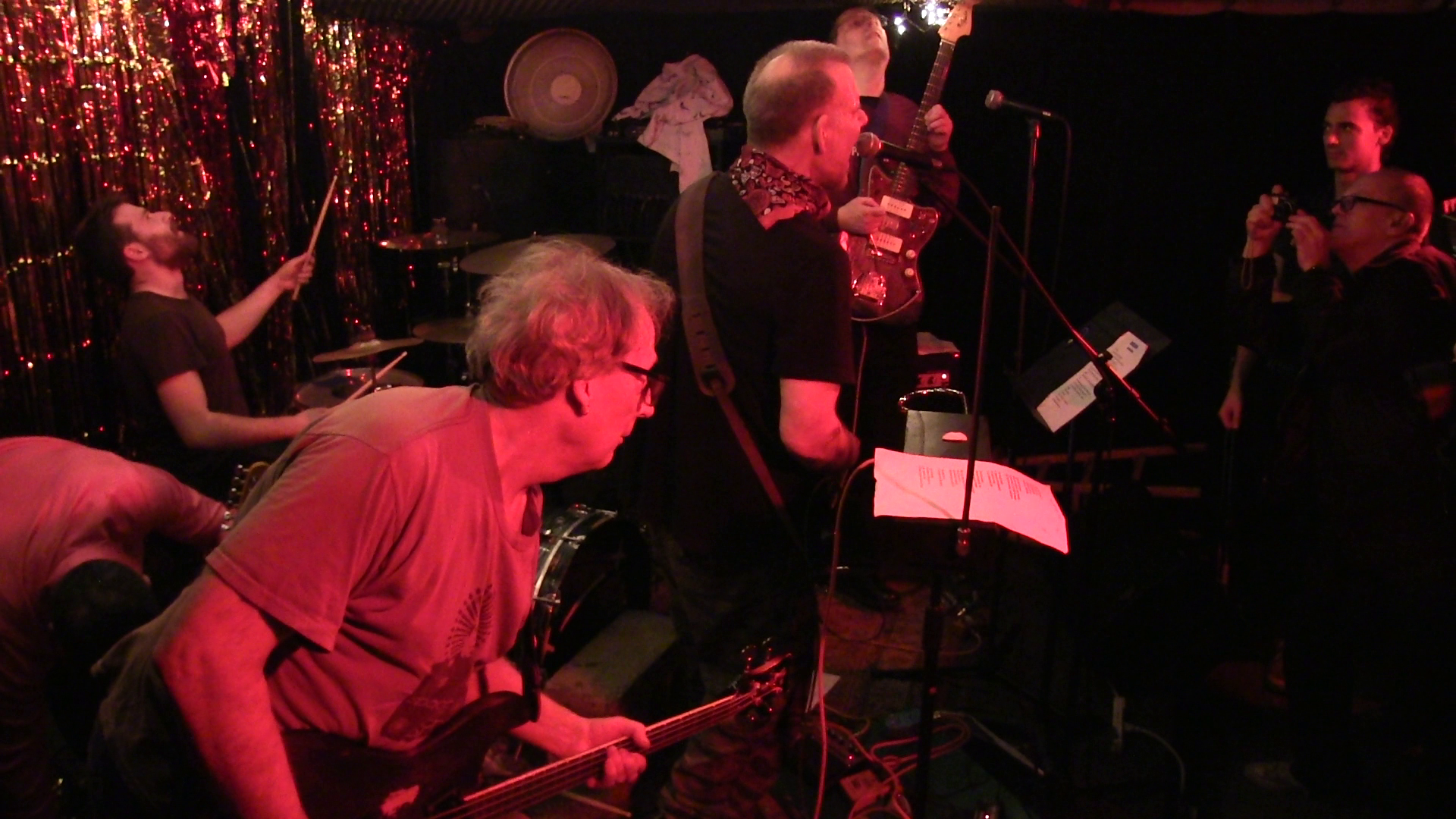
X____X performing at Cake Shop NYC

Music journalist and historian Jon Savage mentions the band in his book Punk: An Aesthetic Punk: An Aesthetic[2] and also wrote "Anybody who has his or her ears tuned into punk-rock 45s would probably describe X_______X as the swingingest foursome to have hit the music scene since the British invaded these shores."[1], in the liner notes to the 2014 Ektro Records release "X STICKY FINGERS X." Joe Harrington simply said of X_______X in his book 'Sonic Cool: The Life & Death of Rock'N'Roll', "It sure ain't the Allman Brothers!"[3], to show how against the grain of popular music at the time X_______X was. Morton: "(As) an artist, I have always thought it was my mandate to break new ground and push boundaries. I have since found out (to my consternation) that the 'breaking new ground' facet of my aesthetic is not necessarily a common aspiration among other artists and musicians, but I will keep holding sway to it."

One of the 45 covers appeared in the book, Five Hundred 45s Five Hundred 45s

== Discography ==
- X__X 45 A 45 – Drome (1979)
- X__X 45 No Nonsense 45 – Drome (1980)
- X__X LP – X STICKY FINGERS X LP – Ektro Records (2014)
- X__X Albert Ayler's Ghosts live at the Yellow Ghetto EP CD – Smog Veil Records (2015)
- X__X 45 Not Now, No Way – My Mind's Eye Records (2018)
