= List of proto-punk bands =

This is a list of notable proto-punk artists and bands.

== List ==
- ? and the Mysterians
- The 101ers
- The 13th Floor Elevators
- Alice Cooper
- The Amboy Dukes
- Blue Cheer
- Captain Beefheart
- The Chocolate Watchband
- Count Five
- Crushed Butler
- David Bowie
- Death
- Destroy All Monsters
- The Dictators
- Doctors of Madness
- Dr. Feelgood
- The Droogs
- Eddie and the Hot Rods
- Electric Eels
- The Electric Prunes
- Flamin' Groovies
- The Fugs
- Woody Guthrie
- Hawkwind
- The Hangmen
- The Hollywood Brats
- John's Children
- Juice Leskinen & Coitus Int
- Kilburn and the High Roads
- The Kingsmen
- The Kinks
- MC5
- The Modern Lovers
- The Monks
- Motörhead
- The Music Machine
- Neu!
- New York Dolls
- The Night Walkers
- John Otway & Wild Willy Barrett
- Pink Fairies
- Paul Revere & The Raiders
- Rocket from the Tombs
- Los Saicos
- Sam the Sham & the Pharaohs
- The Seeds
- The Shadows of Knight
- The Shaggs
- Simply Saucer
- Patti Smith
- The Sonics
- Chris Spedding
- The Spiders from Mars
- The Standells
- The Stooges
- Suicide
- Suomen Talvisota 1939–1940
- Television
- Thee Midniters
- Them
- Third World War
- The Troggs
- The Tubes
- The Up
- The Velvet Underground
- The Wailers
- The Who
- Ton Steine Scherben
- Zakary Thaks
