= Akron Sound =

Music style

The Akron Sound is the independent music, largely new wave and punk rock, coming out of Akron, Ohio, in the late 1970s.

== History ==
In the late 1970s, following the international success of local band Devo, talent scouts combed the city. Soon, several compilation albums promoted the Akron Sound, a multifaceted music scene led by the Waitresses and Rachel Sweet, and many artists of regional prominence including the Numbers Band, Tin Huey, Liam Sternberg, Bizarros, and Rubber City Rebels. Local clubs that featured these bands included the Crypt and the Bank.

== Legacy ==
Photos, recordings, and artifacts are collected at The Akron Sound Museum in downtown Akron.

== See also ==
- Culture of Akron, Ohio
- Cleveland punk

== Bibliography ==
- The Akron Sound: The Heyday of the Midwest's Punk Capital by Calvin C. Rydbom (The History Press; March 5, 2018)
- Akron 200: The History of the Akron Sound, Part One (panel discussion held at the Akron-Summit County Public Library, May 20, 2025)
