= Culture of Akron, Ohio =

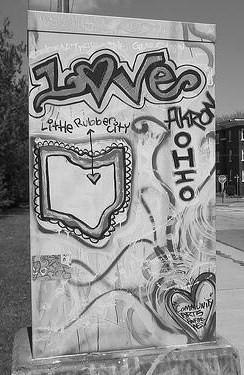
Akron street art, derived from the graffiti subculture

The culture of Akron, Ohio, reflects the influences of people of diverse backgrounds who have lived here since the city's founding in 1825.

== Cuisine ==
The city's largely German-American settlers were joined in the late 1800s and early 1900s by immigrants who brought Jewish, Italian, Lithuanian, Polish, Slovenian and Ukrainian food to the table: pastrami, pierogis, pizza, and sauerkraut balls. Today's restaurants also feature African, Asian, Middle-Eastern, and Mexican cuisine.

Akron is a haven for urban farming, whose products are used in local restaurants such as Bricco, Cilantro, Crave, and Lockview.

Independent grocery stores include Krieger's, Mustard Seed Market, and Seven Grain Market.

Akron is among the cities that claim to be the birthplace of the hamburger. A "National Hamburger Festival" was held in the city annually for many years.

== Fine arts ==
Founded in 1922, the Akron Art Museum was vastly expanded in the early 2000s and now hosts international exhibitions along with its local collections.

Across the street from the museum is the small, independent Nightlight Cinema. As Vogue describes it, the theater "focuses exclusively on locally produced movies, as well as obscure documentaries, foreign films, and first-run indie features (in other words—titles you’ve likely never heard of, and that’s the point)".

== Literature ==
The award-winning Knight-Ridder newspaper chain began in Akron as two separate companies, the Akron Beacon Journal and the German-language New Yorker Staats-Zeitung.

The city is the birthplace of Rita Dove, former Poet Laureate Consultant in Poetry to the Library of Congress.

Sojourner Truth gave her famous "Ain't I A Woman" speech in Akron at the Ohio Women's Rights Convention in 1851.

The city is and has been home to award-winning writers David Auburn and Terry Pluto.

A former literary editor of Esquire, Adrienne Miller, came from the Akron suburbs; she later wrote the novel The Coast of Akron.

The Saalfield Publishing Company of Akron, Ohio published children's books and other products from 1900 to 1977. It was once one of the largest publishers of children's materials in the world.

=== Comic books ===
The landmark Akron pizza shop Luigi's is the inspiration for the pizza shop Montoni's in the comic strip Funky Winkerbean, written by Akron native Tom Batiuk.

In the Flaming Carrot Comics, Iron City, where the Carrot lives, was made similar to Akron and another working-stiff town, Pittsburgh.

Writer and illustrator Bill Watterson has also lived in the county.

== Music ==
Akron has been home to a wide variety of musical artists including:

- country singer David Allan Coe
- rhythm and blues singers Howard Hewett, James Ingram, and Ruby Nash Curtis
- jazz musician Jeff Golub
- folk musician Len Chandler
- vocalist Helen Jepson
- big band leader Vaughn Monroe
- opera singer Russell Oberlin
- composer Nikola Resanovic
- singer-songwriters Joseph Arthur, Roger Hoover, and Pete Nischt
- avant garde musician Ralph Carney
- novelty songwriters Buckner & Garcia
- The Akron Symphony Orchestra
- composer Julia Perry

=== Rock music ===
In the late 1970s, following the international success of local band Devo, talent scouts combed the city. Soon, several compilation albums promoted the "Akron Sound", a multifaceted music scene led by the Waitresses and Rachel Sweet, and many artists of regional prominence including Tin Huey, Liam Sternberg, Bizarros, and Rubber City Rebels.

Other major rock musicians from the city are:

- Chrissie Hynde, lead singer for the Pretenders
- The Black Keys
- If These Trees Could Talk
- Chi-Pig
- Hammer Damage
- Robert Quine
- Glen Buxton
- Lux Interior
- Jani Lane
- Tim "Ripper" Owens
- Dominic Frasca
- Neal Smith
- Harvey Gold
- Liam Lynch

The city's music scene is chronicled and commemorated in the Akron Sound Museum, established in 2015.

=== Concert venues ===
The Akron Art Museum has hosted free outdoor concerts every summer since 1984.

Major venues for music in Akron include the Akron Civic Theatre, E.J. Thomas Hall, and Blossom Music Center. Residents and fans of alternative music still miss the Lime Spider, but continue to appreciate new bands and live poetry at Annabelle's and Paolo's.

The North Hill neighborhood was known for jazz during the early 1900s.

== Sports and recreation ==
The city is home to basketball superstar LeBron James, and renamed part of its Main Street to "King James Way" in his honor. The city hosts a Minor League Baseball team, the Akron RubberDucks, who play at 7 17 Credit Union Park. The World Championship finals of Soap Box Derby are held annually at Derby Downs.

Hikers and bikers have long enjoyed the Ohio & Erie Canal Towpath Trail, which runs through Akron and on to Cleveland.
