= List of art punk bands =

The following is a list of art punk bands. Art punk is a subgenre of punk rock influenced by art school culture.

Contents
0–9 · A · B · C · D · E · F · G · H · I · J · K · L · M · N · O · P · R · S · T · U · V · W · X · Y · Z

== D ==
- Devo

== G ==
- GRÓA

== M ==
- Minny Pops
- The Monsoon Bassoon

== P ==
- Pere Ubu

== S ==
- Squid
- Suuns

== T ==
- Television
- The Victorian English Gentlemens Club

== W ==
- Wire

== Y ==
- Yeah Yeah Yeahs
