= Liam Sternberg =

American songwriter and producer (born 1949)

- Born: July 28, 1949 (age 76); Akron, Ohio, U.S.
- Genres: Pop · new wave · Akron sound

Liam Sternberg (born July 28, 1949) is an American songwriter and producer who wrote the Bangles' hit "Walk Like an Egyptian".

== Career ==
Sternberg began his musical career as part of the late-1970s "Akron Sound" which included Devo and the Waitresses. A member of the band Jane Aire and the Belvederes, Sternberg curated an Akron Sound compilation album for Stiff Records, which gained the attention of rock critic Robert Christgau and brought national attention to the scene. Following this, he worked for other artists including Kirsty MacColl, Rachel Sweet, Ratt, Fuzzbox, Riff Regan, Jane Aire and the Belvederes, and Baby Tuckoo. As a songwriter, Sternberg was the composer of the theme for the hit television program 21 Jump Street. In 1980, Sternberg also produced the first single from the post-punk band Theatre of Hate, featuring vocalist Kirk Brandon.

== Personal life ==
Sternberg has lived in Paris since 1990.
