= Proto-punk =

Music that foreshadowed the punk rock genre

- Other names: Protopunk
- Stylistic origins: Garage rock; pub rock; glam rock
- Derivative forms: Punk rock; garage punk; hardcore punk

Fusion genres
- Glam punk

Other topics
- History of the punk subculture; acid rock; hard rock; punk blues; rock and roll; post-punk

Proto-punk (or protopunk) is music that foreshadowed the punk rock genre, particularly rock music artists during the 1960s and early-to mid 1970s. A retrospective label, the musicians involved were generally not originally associated with each other and came from a variety of backgrounds and styles; together, they anticipated many of punk's musical and thematic attributes.

The tendency towards aggressive, raw, simplistic rock songs is a trend rooted in the earliest forms of rock and roll. The American garage rock movement of the mid-1960s is a key influence in the development of punk rock. By the late 1960s, Detroit bands the Stooges and MC5 had taken the influence of garage groups to form a distinct prototypical punk sound. In the following years, this sound spread both domestically and internationally, alongside glam rock and pub rock, into several regional early underground punk scenes in New York, Ohio, Australia and England.

== Etymology ==
The term proto-punk has been defined differently by several writers and publications. In his essay Protopunk: the Garage Bands, music critic Lester Bangs applied the term to 1960s garage rock acts as well as Ritchie Valens' 1958 cover of "La Bamba".

However, in 2010, writers Lars J. Kristiansen, Joseph R. Blaney, Philip J. Chidester, Brent K. Simonds in their book Screaming for Change: Articulating a Unifying Philosophy of Punk Rock, defined "proto-punk" as emerging after the wave of mid-60s garage rock, and specifically referring to groups who were inspired by Detroit acts such as the Stooges and MC5, with the sound then spreading to the United Kingdom, New York, Australia and Cleveland, Ohio:

Although Velvet Underground served as an important influence, proto-punk is largely a term used to describe bands that followed in the wake of the first wave of garage rock. More specifically, it is a label normally reserved for bands such as MC5 and the Stooges that sprung out of Detroit, Michigan, and its surrounding areas.

The book further states that "Although largely an American phenomenon, proto-punk can also be found in Britain. In Britain, however, it went under different names, and it is commonly referred to as either glam rock or pub rock".

AllMusic defined proto-punk as "never a cohesive movement" but as "a certain provocative sensibility that didn't fit the prevailing counterculture of the time", most of the time combined with a sound which was "primitive and stripped-down, even when it wasn't aggressive, and its production was usually just as unpolished".

== History ==
=== 1930s–1950s ===
One of the earliest forerunners to the punk subculture is folk musician Woody Guthrie. Guthrie, whose career began in the 1930s and blossomed in the 1940s, has been called one of the first punks.

According to PopMatters writer Ian Ellis, the emergence of skiffle in the 1950s in the United Kingdom similarly to punk "stripped music to its core", with its simplistic instrumental setup that "sent out a clear anyone-can-do-it signal, and as the skiffle explosion proved, anyone could and did". According to Aidan Smith in The Scotsman, popular skiffle musician Lonnie Donegan embodied a "dangerous and daring and do-it-yourself" aesthetic that was later adopted by punk; Smith also commented that one of Donegan's combos "attracted a wild following: men so epicly drunk they'd wet themselves and – very proto-punk, this – their duffel-coats were accessorised with alarm clocks hung round necks." According to Tom Ewing of Freaky Trigger, Donegan's 1957 British chart-topper "Cumberland Gap" was "the first punk No. 1". Ewing added, "Lurching speed-freak skiffle played on Christ knows what which sounds nothing remotely like any previous chart-topper: if punk is anything, it might as well be that." Ellis writes: "Forerunners of punk by 20 years, Donegan and the thousands of other skiffle acts that sprang up after 'Rock Island Line' wrested control from the establishment, democratizing the industry in the process."

In his essay Protopunk: the Garage Bands, music critic Lester Bangs traced the origins of punk to Ritchie Valens' 1958 version of the Mexican folk song "La Bamba", due to the song's simplistic three chord song structure and the aggressive vocals relative to the time.

=== 1960s: Garage rock ===
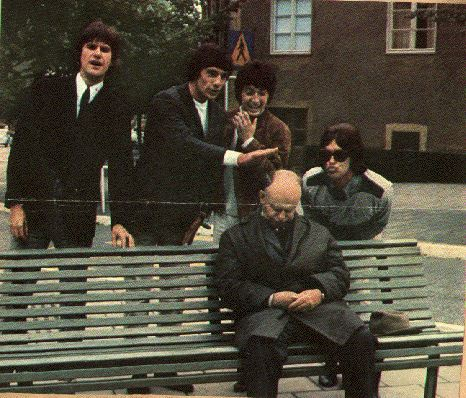
The Kinks' 1964 song "You Really Got Me" was credited by Lester Bangs as one of the most influential songs on the development of punk

Lester Bangs cites a lineage of influential tracks, which over time developed punk: the Kingsmen's "Louie Louie" (1963); the Kinks "You Really Got Me" (1964) and the Stooges' "No Fun" (1969). By the 1960s, garage rock, a style of raw, loud and energetic rock music, had developed scenes in both the United States and United Kingdom. The Kingsmen and the Kinks came from the US' and UK's garage rock scene respectively; the former's cover of "Louie Louie" was described by academic Aneta Panek as "punk rock's ur-text". In the following years, this raw sound was being adopted by other British Invasion acts including the Who on their single "My Generation" (1965) and the Rolling Stones on their 1966 live album Got Live If You Want It!. In South America, the garage rock band Los Saicos formed in Lima, Peru, in 1964, later being called "the world's first punk band" in Zona de Obras' book Spanish Dictionary of Punk and Hardcore.

AllMusic states that bands like the Sonics and the Monks "anticipated" punk; they have been cited as examples of proto-punk and the Sonics' 1965 debut album Here Are The Sonics as "an early template for punk rock". Garage-psych bands like the Seeds also presaged punk; other examples are the Electric Prunes, Red Crayola, the Litter, the Music Machine, the Shadows of Knight, the Castaways, the Standells, Count Five, the Barbarians, and Chocolate Watchband. Not only did the unconventional sound of garage rock bands go against what was popular in the mainstream, but the visual styles of many bands were purposely contrasted with more popular, polished aesthetics found in mainstream artists.

The British response to garage rock and proto-punk in the mid-1960s was a heavy, distorted, aggressive style coming from the UK underground and mod scenes, later identified as freakbeat. Freakbeat represented a link between the music of the 1960s counterculture and that of the later punk movement, even sometimes described as "more punk than punk itself".

=== 1970s ===
New York's the Velvet Underground were musically distinct from most other punk predecessors. They influenced punk through their avant-garde take on rock, which incorporated dissonance and taboo lyrical topics such as urban decay, drug addiction and sadomasochism. In 2014, the BBC stated, "The roots of underground and experimental music, indie and alternative, punk, post-punk and art-punk all snake back to the four Velvet Underground studio albums".

In Japan, the anti-establishment Zunō Keisatsu (頭脳警察, lit. 'Brain Police'), formed in 1969 and disbanded in 1975, mixed garage, psychedelic rock and folk; the band's first two albums were withdrawn from public sale after their lyrics were described in Mark Anderson's book The Encyclopedia of Contemporary Japanese Culture to violate industry regulations, with their "spirit... [being] taken up again by the punk movement."

In the early 1970s, the UK underground counter-cultural scene centred on Ladbroke Grove in West London spawned a number of bands that have been considered proto-punk, including the Deviants, Pink Fairies, Hawkwind, Edgar Broughton Band, Stack Waddy, and Third World War; contemporaries Crushed Butler have been called "Britain's first proto-punk band." According to Allmusic, glam rock also "inspired many future punks with its simple, crunchy guitar riffs, its outrageous sense of style, and its artists' willingness to sing with British accents (not to mention the idiosyncratic images of David Bowie and Roxy Music)". With his Ziggy Stardust persona, David Bowie made artifice and exaggeration central elements, ones that were later picked up by punk acts. The Doctors of Madness built on Bowie's presentation concepts, while moving conceptually in the direction that would The Guardian writer Simon Reynolds identified as "prophes[ying] punk".

Bands anticipating the forthcoming movement were appearing as far afield as Düsseldorf, West Germany, where "punk before punk" band NEU! formed in 1971, building on the krautrock tradition of groups such as Can. Simply Saucer formed in Hamilton, Canada in 1973 and have been called "Canada's first proto-punk band", blending garage rock, krautrock, psychedelia and other influences to produce a sound that was later described as having a "frequent punk snarl."

==== Detroit proto-punk sound ====
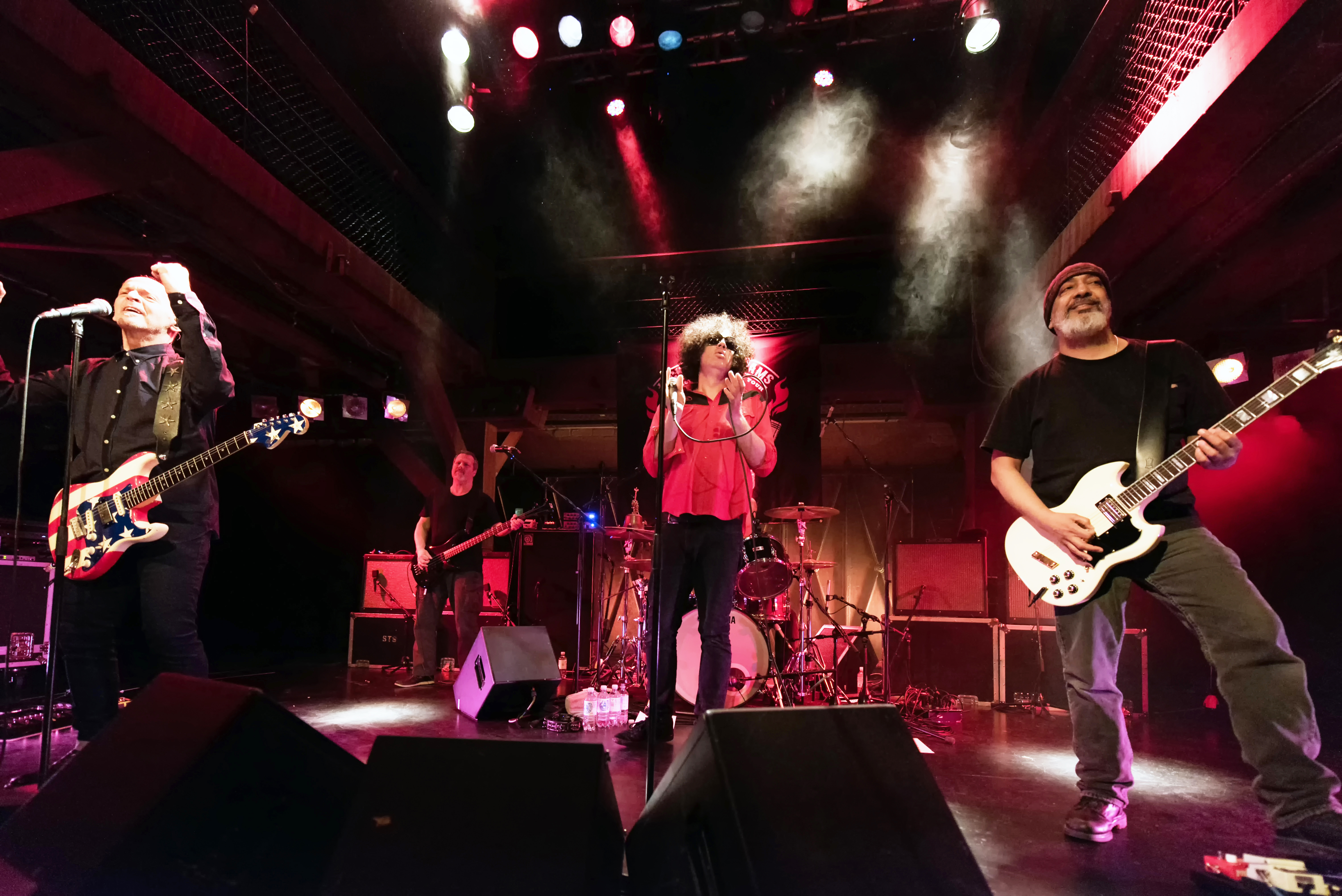
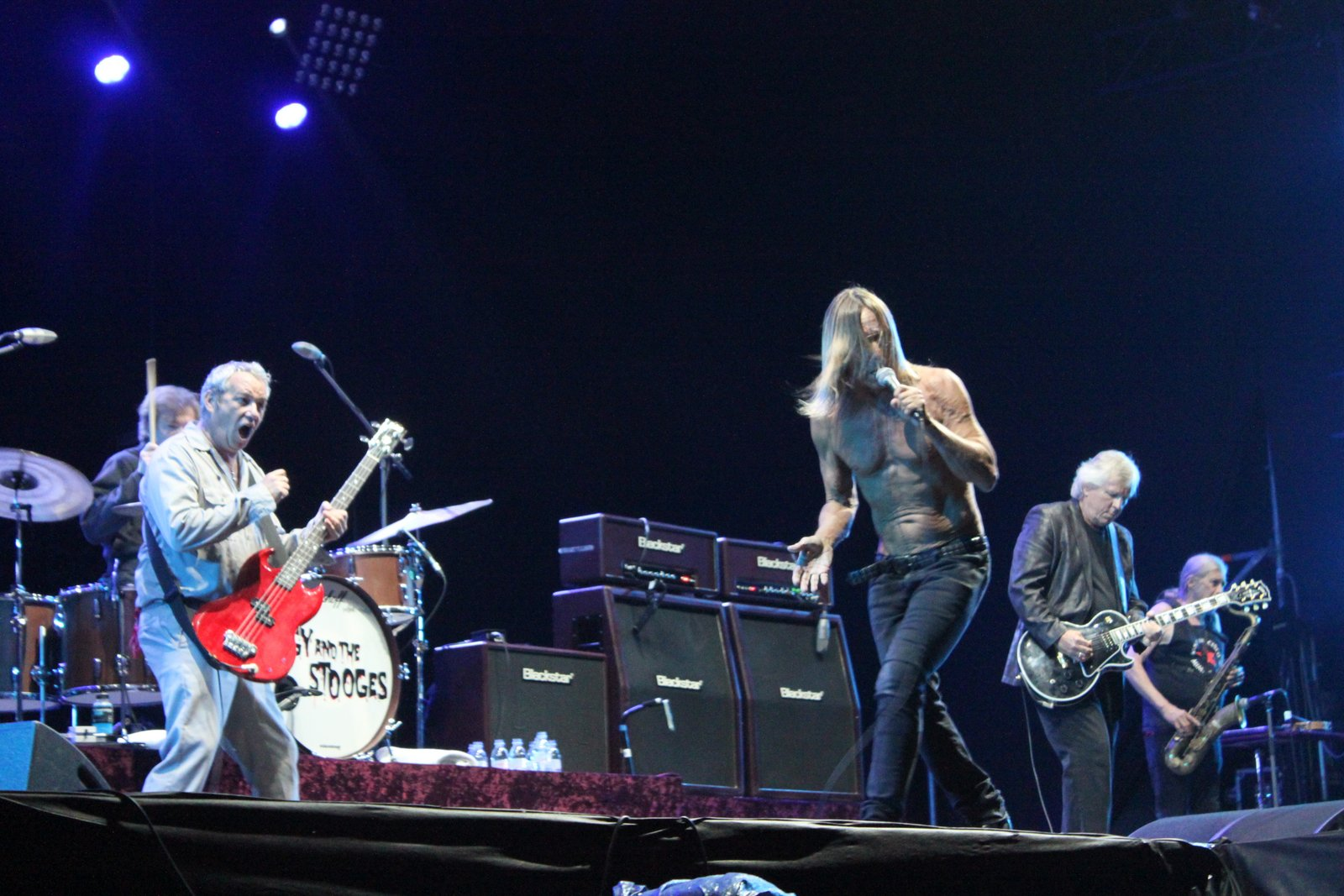
Detroit bands MC5 (top) and the Stooges (bottom) influenced the majority of early punk bands

The MC5 (also known as the "Motor City Five") formed in Lincoln Park, Michigan in 1963, the group began as an R&B and garage rock band, later releasing the single "Borderline" backed with "Looking at You" in 1968 on A-Square records, without the knowledge of that label's owner Jeep Holland, the single sold out thousands of copies. Guitarist Wayne Kramer's style was retrospectively described by The Guardian as showcasing "an edge of atonality and barely controlled chaos." Similarly, the Up, formed in Michigan in 1967 were another Detroit band closely associated with the MC5 and early Detroit punk scene, they've been described as an "important step in the evolution of punk rock". In February 1969, the MC5 released their influential debut album, Kick Out the Jams, which was later considered an influential and important forerunner to punk rock music.

In August 1969, the Stooges, from Ann Arbor, premiered with a self-titled album, produced by John Cale, formerly of the Velvet Underground. The album was later followed by the release of further influential records; Fun House and Raw Power, both of which helped establish a "blueprint for punk rock". Stooges' vocalist Iggy Pop would go on to be described as "the Godfather of Punk" due to his on-stage antics and confrontational attitude. The influence of the Stooges also inspired other early Michigan punk bands such as the Dogs and the Punks. In 1973, Destroy All Monsters formed, featuring Stooges guitarist Ron Asheton and MC5 bassist Michael Davis. Followed by, early punk supergroup, the Sonic's Rendezvous Band which was formed by guitarist Fred "Sonic" Smith, formerly of the MC5, Gary Rasmussen, formerly of the Up on bass and Scott Asheton, formerly of the Stooges on drums. Additionally, Detroit band Death formed in 1971, by three African American brothers, recorded "scorching blasts of feral ur-punk". However, due to their name could not secure a record deal, they released the single "Politicians in My Eyes" backed with "Keep On Knockin" in 1976 and promptly disbanded, only to be rediscovered decades later.

===== Development of punk rock =====
Formed in New York in 1971, the New York Dolls merged Detroit's specific proto-punk sound with elements of glam rock, pioneering the glam punk genre. According to Alternative Press magazine, they "were the most important of all protopunk bands" after the Stooges. Their style was adopted by a number of New York bands, including the Stilettos, the Brats and Ruby and the Rednecks, and subsequently was the catalyst for the city's early punk rock scene, which included Television, Talking Heads, Patti Smith, the Ramones, Blondie and Richard Hell and the Voidoids.

The Detroit proto-punk sound spread to Cleveland, Ohio by the middle of the decade, where influential proto-punk bands including Mirrors, Electric Eels, the Styrenes, Rocket from the Tombs, and later Pere Ubu formed.

During the mid–1970s the British pub rock scene, which was mostly based around London. Influenced by Detroit proto-punk, this style made use of stripped down, back to its basics, rock music similar to punk, and was fronted by groups including Dr. Feelgood, Tyla Gang, Eddie and the Hot Rods and Count Bishops. Many of the early British punk scene's musician began their careers in pub rock acts, including the 101ers (Joe Strummer, Richard Dudanski, Tymon Dogg), Kilburn and the High Roads (Ian Dury, Nick Cash) and Flip City (Elvis Costello). By 1976, pub rock had ultimately declined in popularity. At the same time as pub rock, the influence of the New York Dolls had spread to London, where a wave of glam punk bands, including Hollywood Brats and Jet, coalesced by the middle of the decade.

A new generation of Australian garage rock bands, inspired mainly by the Stooges and MC5, came even closer to the sound that would soon be called "punk": in Brisbane, the Saints (formed in 1973) recalled the raw live sound of the Pretty Things, who had made a notorious tour of Australia and New Zealand in 1965, while in Sydney, Radio Birdman, co-founded by Detroit expatriate Deniz Tek in 1974, began playing gigs to a small but fanatical following. The Saints are regarded as a punk band and as being "to Australia what the Sex Pistols were to Britain and the Ramones to America," while Radio Birdman are regarded as co-founders of punk but have also been designated as proto-punk.

== See also ==
- List of proto-punk bands
