= Michele Zalopany =

American artist

Michele Zalopany (born 1955) is an American artist, known in particular for her large-scale pastel paintings. Zalopany exhibited in the 1989 Whitney Biennial.

== Collections ==
Zalopany's work is included in the collections of the Whitney Museum of American Art, the San Francisco Museum of Modern Art, and the National Gallery of Art, Washington DC.
