= The Styrenes =

American proto-punk rock band

The Styrenes are an American proto-punk rock band, formed in Cleveland, Ohio, in 1975 by former members of other Cleveland punk bands, the electric eels and Mirrors.

== Members ==
- Paul Marotta − vocals, guitar, piano
- UK Rattay − guitar
- Al Margolis − bass, vocals
- John Keith − drums, vocals

=== Former members ===
- Jamie Klimek − guitar, vocals
- Paul Laurence − drums
- Mike Hudson − vocals
- Mike Hoffman − drums
- Fred Lonberg-Holm − cello
- John D Morton − guitar
- Jim Jones − bass
- Anton Fier − drums
- David Newman - bass
- Tim Moes - guitar

== Discography ==
- Girl Crazy (Mustard MM 4401) 1982
- Hudson/Styrene: A Monster And The Devil (Tinnitus 191305) 1989

Re-released with bonus tracks as All the Wrong People Are Dying (Overground Records Over74) 1998

- It's Artastic (Homestead Productions) 1991
- We Care, So You Don't Have To (Scat Records Scat 63) 1998
- It's Still Artastic (ROIR RUSCD 8276) 2002
- In C - Terry Riley (Enja 9435) 2002
- City of Women (Rent A Dog bone 3010-2) 2007
