= Mirrors (Ohio band) =

American rock band

- Origin: Cleveland, Ohio, United States
- Genres: Rock, proto-punk, punk rock, art punk
- Years active: 1971–1975, 1986–1988, 2013–2014
- Labels: Heathen, Resonance, Overground Records, ROIR, Violent Times
- Past members: Jamie Klimek; Jim Crook; Mike Weldon; Craig Bell; Jim Jones; Paul Marotta

Mirrors (a.k.a. the Mirrors) was an American rock band from Cleveland, Ohio, United States, forming in 1971 and originally active playing live gigs between 1972 - 1975. Their sound has been described as "psychedelic garage" and "proto-punk". In his review of a 2009 LP of their 1970's material for Mother Jones former Maximumrocknroll editor Mark Murrmann described them as "not as bent as the Electric Eels...nor as throttling as Rocket from the Tombs." The band's founder, Jaime Klimek, who sang and played guitar, said they "were ferociously loud." The other members were Jim Crook, guitar; Mike Weldon (who started Psychotronic Video magazine in 1980), drums; and a succession of bassists—first Craig Bell (later of Rocket from the Tombs), followed briefly by Paul Marotta, who soon switched to keyboards (and also played with the Electric Eels), then Jim Jones (who later played guitar in Pere Ubu), then Bell again, and finally Jones again. In some of their recordings Jones played drums. They played original songs and covers originally by the Velvet Underground, the Kinks, the Troggs and Brian Eno among others. After they broke up Klimek, Jones, Marotta, other former members of the Electric Eels and Anton Fier formed the Styrenes. In 2013 and 2014 Klimek, Crook, Bell and other musicians played some reunion shows in Cleveland.

The original incarnation of the group release a posthumous 7" single on Hearthan Records: "Shirley" b/w "She Smiled Wild." This was the fifth release for the label, which was operated by David Thomas, and the first which was not a Pere Ubu release. Between 1986 and 1988, the original Mirrors lineup recorded the album Another Nail in the Coffin, produced by Marotta, which was briefly available in 1989 before the Dutch label which released it, Resonance, went bankrupt. In 1997 Scat Records released Those Were Different Times: Cleveland 1972-1976, a CD with songs by Mirrors, the electric eels and the Styrenes. In 2001 Mirrors put out Hands in My Pockets, a 19-song CD of material they had recorded in the 1970s. Mostly made up of studio tracks, it also included some home recordings and live material. In 2004 ROIR released Another Nail in the {Remodeled} Coffin, a reissue of the 1989 album plus a second CD with demos, live tracks and alternate takes. In 2009 Violent Times Records issued Something That Would Never Do, a limited edition LP of previously released songs recorded 1974–75.

== Discography ==
- "Shirley" b/w "She Smiled Wild", 7" single (1975) Hearthan Records
- Another Nail in the Coffin, LP (1989) Resonance (Neth.)
- Those Were Different Times: Cleveland 1972-1976, compilation CD (1997 archival) Scat
- Hands in My Pockets, CD (2001, archival 1970's) Overground Records (UK)
- Another Nail in the {Remodeled} Coffin, 2x CD (2004, archival) ROIR
- Something That Would Never Do, LP (2009, archival 1970's) Violent Times
- "Slow Down" 1974 Mirrors track on Craig Bell's archival LP, "aka Darwin Layne" ever/never Records (2016)
