= Electric Eels (band) =

American protopunk band

- Electric Eels, 1975. Left to right: Brian McMahon, Dave E., John D Morton and Nick Knox Photo:Michele Zalopany

Background information
- Origin: Cleveland, Ohio, United States
- Genres: Proto-punk; punk rock; art punk; noise rock
- Years active: 1972–1975
- Past members: John Morton; Brian McMahon; Dave E. Nick Knox; Paul Marotta; Jim Jones

The Electric Eels (stylized in lowercase in honor of E. E. Cummings) were an American rock band active between 1972 and 1975, formed by John D Morton in Cleveland, Ohio.

The Electric Eels played only five public shows, but during their brief existence they earned a reputation locally for being angry, confrontational and violent. They were notorious for starting fights with audiences which drew police attention; members were also abusive to each other off-stage. Their style was a discordant, noisy amalgam of hard garage rock and free jazz. Stiv Bators, the singer of The Dead Boys, was particularly influenced by the vocal styling and stage presence of Dave "E" McManus. While the Eels didn't play many shows, they rehearsed often, eventually making many recordings which were released many years after their demise.

== Background ==
Along with Morton (guitar), other original members were Dave "E" McManus (vocals, clarinet) and Brian McMahon (guitar; not to be confused with Slint member), all ex-pupils of Lakewood High School, Lakewood, Ohio. The three had been to see a Captain Beefheart gig and been unimpressed enough by the support band (Youngstown's Left End) to decide that they could do better themselves. Unlike other rock groups of the era, Morton had also been influenced by free jazz: "I remember listening to free jazz, Ornette Coleman... we listened to John Cage, and Sun Ra and Ayler. That's what [the Eels] was supposed to be [but] we didn't really understand it." This also led to early meetings with Peter Laughner of Rocket from the Tombs at the local record store.

The Electric Eels featured unconventional instrumentation initially, with no drummer nor anyone who was technically competent on any musical instruments. Their rare performances did feature, at various times, sheet metal hit with sledgehammers, anvils, a power lawnmower and fist fights. This led to the description of their act as "art terrorism". Much of 1973 and 1974 was spent, mostly unsuccessfully, trying to get gigs in bars that normally booked Top 40 covers bands in Cleveland and then Columbus, where the band moved for some months. Morton has claimed that this move was caused by death threats he received in Cleveland for sleeping with "one too many married women". When gigs did happen, promoters were known to pull them halfway through. On their debut show, the band were arrested by police for being drunk and disorderly. Morton resisted arrest and gained a broken hand, which caused him to play their next gig three weeks later with an improvised splint made from a slide rule and a wrench.

Morton, in particular, had an inclination for violence that often led to physical fights and temporary splits in the band. He and McMahon would occasionally go to working-class bars and provoke fights by dancing together.

In late 1973 McMahon left the band, replaced by Paul Marotta, who was a competent musician on both guitar and keyboards and was simultaneously a member of Mirrors. Drummers came and left during the history of the band, but bass guitar was always absent. By early 1975, Marotta had quit and McMahon had returned. Marotta would record the band throughout that year and play during some August recording sessions that also included a bass.

The deliberate provocation and controversy of the band also saw them use the Nazi imagery of the swastika, Morton later claiming that this was influenced by William Burroughs and Lenny Bruce: "That is something we wanted, to have that provocation, we wanted to confront those issues". In addition, excerpts taken from racist American Nazi Party literature were used as an inspiration sheet for extemporaneous lyrics in the song "Spinach Blasters" (AKA "Spin Age Blasters"). Marotta: "It was shock tactics. It was confrontational art. It was meant to be satire". This presaged the use of similar shock tactics and images by other punks in New York City and London, such as Johnny Thunders, Sid Vicious and Siouxsie Sioux.

Eventually the Electric Eels got a gig at a Cleveland venue which would support original music, The Viking Saloon's "Special Extermination Night" 22 December 1974 with Rocket from the Tombs and Mirrors. This gig marked the public start of a new and unique Cleveland punk rock scene. However, the repeat event in January 1975 would see the Eels banned from the last bar that would have them, due to their use on stage of a gas-powered lawnmower. This led to the departure from the band of Marotta.

After Marotta left the band, Brian McMahon rejoined and they also recruited drummer Nick Knox, later to find fame with The Cramps. They made their peace with Marotta, who went on to record some of their rehearsals in early 1975. It is these sessions which make up most of the Eels' material released since their demise, including the 1978 Rough Trade single "Agitated" b/w "Cyclotron", which was their only released recording for many years. The song "Cyclotron" has a lyrical reference to Elton John whose music and style often crossed over into the glam rock scene.

However, the Knox line-up of the band was short-lived, performing only one gig – the band's fifth, overall – at Case Western Reserve University in 1975 (sources differ as to whether this was in May or September of that year), before finally splitting there and then due to a Morton-inspired fist fight.

Later that year the original three Eels members, Marotta and two members of Mirrors formed a new band, The Men from UNCLE, but this lasted only two rehearsals before splitting again. Marotta went on to form The Styrenes, of which Morton was also an occasional member.

== Discography ==
Studio albums

- Having a Philosophical Investigation with The Electric Eels (1989; archival)
- God Says Fuck You (1991; archival)
- The Beast 999 Presents The Electric Eels in Their Organic Majesty's Request (1991; archival)
- The Eyeball of Hell (2001; archival)

Singles

- "Agitated"/"Cyclotron" (1978)
- "Spin Age Blasters"/"Bunnies" (1981)
- "Jaguar Ride" (2014)

Compilation albums

- Die Electric Eels (2014)

== Sources ==
- Heylin, Clinton (1993). From the Velvets to the Voidoids: A Pre-Punk History for a Post-Punk World. Penguin Books. ISBN 1-55652-575-3.
- Morton, John; Marotta, Paul (2001). The Eyeball of Hell (CD liner notes).
