= Punk rock =

Music genre

- Other names: Punk
- Stylistic origins: Garage rock; proto-punk; rock and roll; rockabilly; glam rock; pub rock; surf music
- Cultural origins: Mid-1970s, United States, United Kingdom, and Australia
- Derivative forms: Alternative rock; new wave; new musick; indie rock; twee pop; industrial; no wave; noise rock; NWOBHM; speed metal; thrash metal; post-punk; grindcore; grunge; deathrock; incelcore

Subgenres
- Anarcho-punk; art punk; hardcore punk; horror punk; oi!; post-hardcore; queercore; riot grrrl; skate punk; street punk; egg punk; afro-punk; Christian punk; crust punk; garage punk; peace punk; punk pathetique; taqwacore; trallpunk; (complete list)

Fusion genres
- 2 tone; anti-folk; cowpunk; dance-punk; deathrock; folk punk; glam punk; surf punk; garage punk; grebo; gypsy punk; pop-punk; psychobilly; punk blues; punk jazz; ska punk; punk rap; reggae punk; burning spirits; Celtic punk; Chicano punk; dark cabaret; Latin punk; melodic punk; punk metal; rapcore; Scottish Gaelic punk; Spanish raw punk; synth-punk

Regional scenes
- Australia; Basque Country; Brazil; California; Cuba; Canada; France; Germany; Netherlands; Peru; Philadelphia; Scotland; Spain; Yugoslavia; Greece

Local scenes
- New York City; Cleveland; Birmingham; Brisbane; Leeds

Other topics
- DIY ethic; Generation Jones; Generation X; list of bands, 0–K; list of bands, L–Z; list of festivals; punk fashion; History of the punk subculture; punk subculture; punk zine; timeline

Punk rock (or simply punk) is a genre of rock music that emerged in the mid-1970s. Rooted in 1950s rock and roll and 1960s garage rock, punk bands rejected the overproduction and corporate nature of mainstream arena rock. They typically produce short, fast-paced songs with rough, stripped-down vocals and instrumentation, and anti-establishment themes. Artists also embraced a DIY ethic, with many bands self-producing and distributing recordings through independent labels.

During the early 1970s, the term "punk rock" was originally used by some American rock critics to describe mid-1960s garage bands. Subsequent developments such as glam and pub rock in the UK, along with the Velvet Underground and the New York Dolls from New York, and the MC5 and the Stooges from Detroit, have been cited as key influences. By the mid-1970s, the term "punk rock" had become associated with several regional underground music scenes, including Television, Patti Smith, Suicide, the Dictators, Richard Hell and the Voidoids, and the Ramones in New York City; Rocket from the Tombs, Electric Eels, and the Dead Boys in Ohio; the Saints and Radio Birdman in Australia; and the Sex Pistols, X-Ray Spex, the Clash, the Damned, and the Buzzcocks in England. By late 1976, punk had become a major cultural phenomenon in the UK, giving rise to a punk subculture that expressed youthful rebellion through distinctive styles of clothing, such as T-shirts with deliberately offensive graphics, leather jackets, studded or spiked bands, jewelry, bondage clothing, and safety pins.

By 1977, the influence of punk music and its associated subculture had spread worldwide, taking root in a wide range of local scenes. The movement expanded into various subgenres during the late 1970s, giving rise to movements such as post-punk, new wave, and art punk. By the early 1980s, punk experienced further diversification with subgenres such as hardcore punk (e.g., Bad Brains, Minor Threat, and Black Flag); Oi! (e.g., Sham 69 and the Exploited); street punk (e.g., GBH, the Partisans, and Chaos UK); and anarcho-punk (e.g., Crass). The movement expanded through several regional scenes in countries such as Japan, the Netherlands, Germany, Spain, Estonia, Greece, and Yugoslavia, among others, and inspired the development of pop-punk, grunge, riot grrrl, and alternative rock.

Following alternative rock's mainstream breakthrough in the 1990s through the success of bands like Nirvana, punk rock saw renewed major-label interest and mainstream appeal, exemplified by the rise of Californian bands such as Green Day, Social Distortion, Rancid, the Offspring, Bad Religion, Blink-182, and NOFX.

== Characteristics ==
=== Outlook ===
The first wave of punk rock was "aggressively modern" and differed from what came before. According to Ramones drummer Tommy Ramone, "In its initial form, a lot of 1960s stuff was innovative and exciting. Unfortunately, what happens is that people who could not hold a candle to the likes of Hendrix started noodling away. Soon you had endless solos that went nowhere. By 1973, I knew that what was needed was some pure, stripped down, no nonsense rock 'n' roll." John Holmstrom, founding editor of Punk magazine, recalls feeling "punk rock had to come along because the rock scene had become so tame that [acts] like Billy Joel and Simon and Garfunkel were being called rock and roll, when to me and other fans, rock and roll meant this wild and rebellious music." According to Robert Christgau, punk "scornfully rejected the political idealism and Californian flower-power silliness of hippie myth."

Hippies were rainbow extremists; punks are romantics of black-and-white. Hippies forced warmth; punks cultivate cool. Hippies kidded themselves about free love; punks pretend that s&m is our condition. As symbols of protest, swastikas are no less fatuous than flowers.

— Robert Christgau in Christgau's Record Guide (1981)

Technical accessibility and a do it yourself (DIY) spirit are prized in punk rock. UK pub rock from 1972 to 1975 contributed to the emergence of punk rock by developing a network of small venues, such as pubs, where non-mainstream bands could play. Pub rock also introduced the idea of independent record labels, such as Stiff Records, which put out basic, low-cost records. Pub rock bands organized their own small venue tours and put out small pressings of their records. In the early days of punk rock, this DIY ethic stood in marked contrast to what those in the scene regarded as the ostentatious musical effects and technological demands of many mainstream rock bands. Musical virtuosity was often looked on with suspicion. According to Holmstrom, punk rock was "rock and roll by people who didn't have very many skills as musicians but still felt the need to express themselves through music". In December 1976, the English fanzine Sideburns published a now-famous illustration of three chords, captioned "This is a chord, this is another, this is a third. Now form a band".

British punk rejected contemporary mainstream rock, the broader culture it represented, and their musical predecessors: "No Elvis, Beatles or the Rolling Stones in 1977", declared the Clash song "1977". 1976, when the punk revolution began in Britain, became a musical and a cultural "Year Zero". As nostalgia was discarded, many in the scene adopted a nihilistic attitude summed up by the Sex Pistols' slogan "No Future"; in the later words of one observer, amid the unemployment and social unrest in 1977, "punk's nihilistic swagger was the most thrilling thing in England." While "self-imposed alienation" was common among "drunk punks" and "gutter punks", there was always a tension between their nihilistic outlook and the "radical leftist utopianism" of bands such as Crass, who found positive, liberating meaning in the movement. As a Clash associate describes singer Joe Strummer's outlook, "Punk rock is meant to be our freedom. We're meant to be able to do what we want to do."

Authenticity has always been important in the punk subculture—the pejorative term "poseur" is applied to those who adopt its stylistic attributes but do not actually share or understand its underlying values and philosophy. Scholar Daniel S. Traber argues that "attaining authenticity in the punk identity can be difficult"; as the punk scene matured, he observes, eventually "everyone got called a poseur".

=== Musical and lyrical elements ===
The early punk bands emulated the minimal musical arrangements of 1960s garage rock. Typical punk rock instrumentation is stripped down to one or two guitars, bass, drums and vocals. Songs tend to be shorter than those of other rock genres and played at fast tempos. Most early punk rock songs retained a traditional rock 'n' roll verse-chorus form and 4/4 time signature. However, later bands often broke from this format. Punk music was not a standalone movement in the 70s and 80s. Major punk communities gather across the globe as punk perseveres among contemporary musicians and listeners today.

The vocals are sometimes nasal, and the lyrics often shouted in an "arrogant snarl", rather than conventionally sung. Complicated guitar solos were considered self-indulgent, although basic guitar breaks were common. Guitar parts tend to include highly distorted power chords or barre chords, creating a characteristic sound described by Christgau as a "buzzsaw drone". Some punk rock bands take a surf rock approach with a lighter, twangier guitar tone. Others, such as Robert Quine, lead guitarist of the Voidoids, have employed a wild, "gonzo" attack, a style that stretches back through the Velvet Underground to the 1950s recordings of Ike Turner. Bass guitar lines are often uncomplicated; the quintessential approach is a relentless, repetitive "forced rhythm", although some punk rock bass players emphasize more technical bass lines. Bassists often use a pick with fingerpicking being less common. Drums typically sound heavy and dry, and often have a minimal set-up. Compared to other forms of rock, syncopation is much less common. Hardcore punk drumming displays a faster tempo. Production tends to be minimalistic, with tracks sometimes laid down on home tape recorders or four-track portastudios.

Punk rock lyrics are typically blunt and confrontational; compared to the lyrics of other popular music genres, they often focus on social and political issues. Trend-setting songs such as the Clash's "Career Opportunities" and Chelsea's "Right to Work" deal with unemployment and the grim realities of urban life. Especially in early British punk, a central goal was to outrage and shock the mainstream. The Sex Pistols' "Anarchy in the U.K." and "God Save the Queen" openly disparaged the British political system and social mores. Anti-sentimental depictions of relationships and sex are common, as in "Love Comes in Spurts", recorded by the Voidoids. Anomie, variously expressed in the poetic terms of Richard Hell's "Blank Generation" and the bluntness of the Ramones' "Now I Wanna Sniff Some Glue", is a common theme. The controversial content of punk lyrics has frequently led to certain punk records being banned by radio stations and refused shelf space in major chain stores. Christgau said that "Punk is so tied up with the disillusions of growing up that punks do often age poorly."

=== Visual and other elements ===
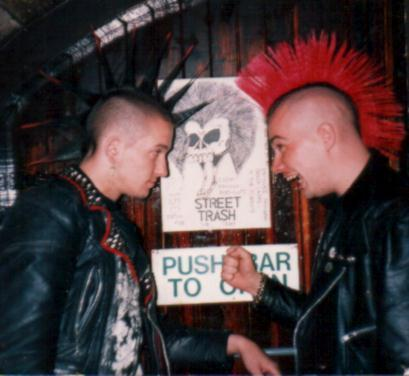
1980s punks with leather jackets and dyed mohawk hairstyles

The classic punk rock look among male American musicians harkens back to the T-shirt, motorcycle jacket, and jeans ensemble favored by American greasers of the 1950s associated with the rockabilly scene and by British rockers of the 1960s. In addition to the T-shirt, and leather jackets they wore ripped jeans and boots, typically Doc Martens. The punk look was inspired to shock people. Richard Hell's more androgynous, ragamuffin look—and reputed invention of the safety-pin aesthetic—was a major influence on Sex Pistols impresario Malcolm McLaren and, in turn, British punk style. (John D Morton of Cleveland's Electric Eels may have been the first rock musician to wear a safety-pin-covered jacket). McLaren's partner, fashion designer Vivienne Westwood, credits Johnny Rotten as the first British punk musician to rip his shirt, and Sex Pistols bassist Sid Vicious as the first to use safety pins, although few of those following punk could afford to buy McLaren and Westwood's designs so famously worn by the Pistols, so they made their own, diversifying the 'look' with various different styles based on these designs.

Young women in punk demolished the typical female types in rock of either "coy sex kittens or wronged blues belters" in their fashion. Early female punk musicians displayed styles ranging from Siouxsie Sioux's bondage gear to Patti Smith's "straight-from-the-gutter androgyny". The former proved much more influential on female fan styles. Over time, tattoos, piercings, and metal-studded and -spiked accessories became increasingly common elements of punk fashion among both musicians and fans, a "style of adornment calculated to disturb and outrage". Among the other facets of the punk rock scene, a punk's hair is an important way of showing their freedom of expression. The typical male punk haircut was originally short and choppy; the mohawk later emerged as a characteristic style. Along with the mohawk, long spikes have been associated with the punk rock genre.

== Etymology ==
Between the late 16th and the 18th centuries, punk was a common, coarse synonym for prostitute; William Shakespeare used it with that meaning in The Merry Wives of Windsor (1602) and Measure for Measure (1603–4). The term eventually came to describe "a young male hustler, a gangster, a hoodlum, or a ruffian".

The first known use of the phrase "punk rock" appeared in the Chicago Tribune on March 22, 1970, when Ed Sanders, co-founder of New York's anarcho-prankster band the Fugs described his first solo album as "punk rock – redneck sentimentality". In 1969 Sanders recorded a song for an album called "Street Punk" but it was only released in 2008. That same year, critic Dave Marsh used the term to describe the garage rock group Question Mark & the Mysterians in the United States, who had scored a major hit with their song "96 Tears" in 1966. In the December 1970 issue of Creem, Lester Bangs, mocking more mainstream rock musicians, ironically referred to Iggy Pop as "that Stooge punk". Suicide's Alan Vega credits this usage with inspiring his duo to bill its gigs as "punk music" or a "punk mass" for the next couple of years.

In the March 1971 issue of Creem, critic Greg Shaw wrote about the Shadows of Knight's "hard-edge punk sound". In an April 1971 issue of Rolling Stone, he referred to a track by the Guess Who as "good, not too imaginative, punk rock and roll". The same month John Medelsohn described Alice Cooper's album Love It to Death as "nicely wrought mainstream punk raunch". Dave Marsh used the term in the May 1971 issue of Creem, where he described ? and the Mysterians as giving a "landmark exposition of punk rock". Later in 1971, in his fanzine Who Put the Bomp, Greg Shaw wrote about "what I have chosen to call "punkrock" bands—white teenage hard rock of '64–66 (Standells, Kingsmen, Shadows of Knight, etc.)". (Note: Robert Christgau writing for the Village Voice in October 1971 refers to "mid-60s punk" as a historical period of rock-and-roll.) Lester Bangs used the term "punk rock" in several articles written in the early 1970s to refer to mid-1960s garage acts.

In the liner notes of the 1972 anthology LP Nuggets, musician and rock journalist Lenny Kaye, later a member of the Patti Smith Group, used the term "punk rock" to describe the genre of 1960s garage bands, while the earliest known use of the term "garage punk" appeared in Kaye's track-by-track liner notes to describe a song by the 1960s garage rock band the Shadows of Knight, which he labelled "classic garage punk". Nick Kent referred to Iggy Pop as the "Punk Messiah of the Teenage Wasteland" in his review of the Stooges July 1972 performance at King's Cross Cinema in London for a British magazine called Cream (no relation to the more famous US publication). In the January 1973 Rolling Stone review of Nuggets, Greg Shaw commented "Punk rock is a fascinating genre... Punk rock at its best is the closest we came in the '60s to the original rockabilly spirit of Rock 'n Roll." In February 1973, Terry Atkinson of the Los Angeles Times, reviewing the debut album by a hard rock band, Aerosmith, declared that it "achieves all that punk-rock bands strive for but most miss." A March 1973 review of an Iggy and the Stooges show in the Detroit Free Press dismissively referred to Pop as "the apotheosis of Detroit punk music". In May 1973, Billy Altman launched the short-lived punk magazine in Buffalo, New York, which was largely devoted to discussion of 1960s garage and psychedelic acts.

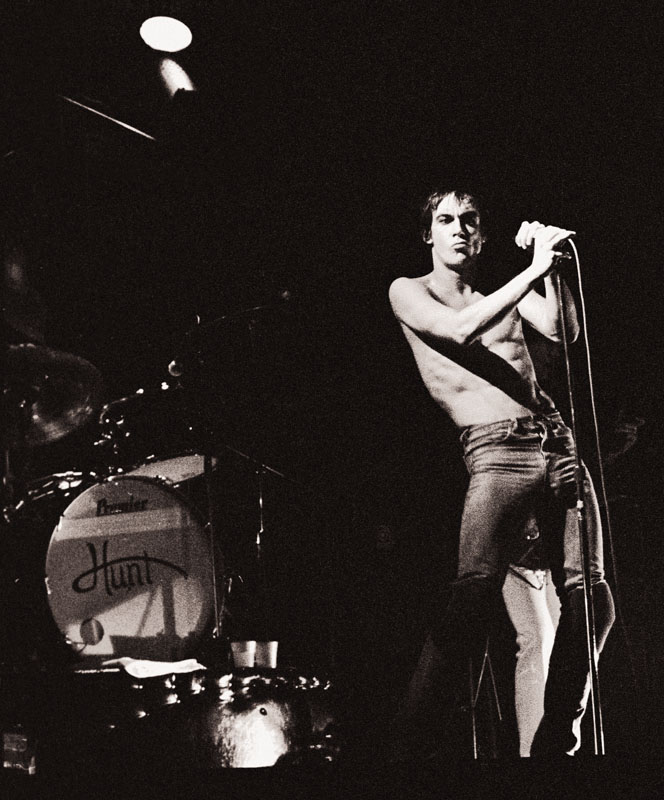
Iggy Pop, sometimes referred to as the "godfather of punk."

Clarence Smith, in the January 1974 issue of Triad magazine, said "Stray Dog [on Manticore] is the first real punk band of the '70's, ..". In May 1974, Los Angeles Times critic Robert Hilburn reviewed the second New York Dolls album, Too Much Too Soon. "I told ya the New York Dolls were the real thing," he wrote, describing the album as "perhaps the best example of raw, thumb-your-nose-at-the-world, punk rock since the Rolling Stones' Exile on Main Street." In a 1974 interview for his fanzine Heavy Metal Digest, Danny Sugerman told Iggy Pop "You went on record as saying you never were a punk" and Iggy replied "...well I ain't. I never was a punk."

By 1975, punk was being used to describe acts as diverse as the Patti Smith Group, the Bay City Rollers, and Bruce Springsteen. As the scene at New York's CBGB club attracted notice, a name was sought for the developing sound. Club owner Hilly Kristal called the movement "Street rock"; John Holmstrom credits Aquarian magazine with using punk "to describe what was going on at CBGBs". Holmstrom, Legs McNeil, and Ged Dunn's magazine Punk, which debuted at the end of 1975, was crucial in codifying the term. "It was pretty obvious that the word was getting very popular", Holmstrom later remarked. "We figured we'd take the name before anyone else claimed it. We wanted to get rid of the bullshit, strip it down to rock 'n' roll. We wanted the fun and liveliness back."

== 1960s–1974: Precursors ==
=== Garage rock and beat ===
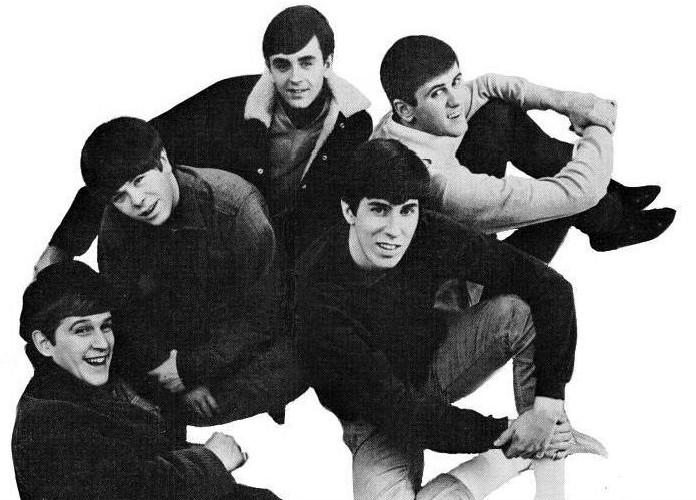
The Kingsmen in 1966. Their cover of "Louie, Louie" was later referred to as punk rock's "ur-text".

The early to mid-1960s garage rock bands in the United States and elsewhere are often recognized as punk rock's progenitors. The Kingsmen's "Louie, Louie" is often cited as punk rock's defining "ur-text". (Note: In the Kingsmen's version, the song's "El Loco Cha-Cha" riffs were pared down to a more simple and primitive rock arrangement providing a stylistic model for countless garage rock bands.) After the success of the British Invasion, the garage phenomenon gathered momentum around the US. By 1965, the harder-edged sound of British acts, such as the Rolling Stones, the Kinks, and the Who, became increasingly influential with American garage bands. The raw sound of U.S. groups such as the Sonics and the Seeds predicted the style of later acts. In the early 1970s some rock critics used the term "punk rock" to refer to the mid-1960s garage genre, as well as for subsequent acts perceived to be in that stylistic tradition, such as the Stooges.

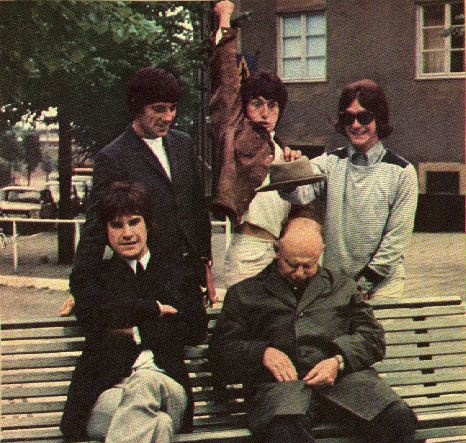
The Kinks' "You Really Got Me" was later cited as an early progenitor of punk rock.

In Britain, largely under the influence of the mod movement and beat groups, the Kinks' 1964 hit singles "You Really Got Me" and "All Day and All of the Night", were both influenced by "Louie, Louie". (Note: The Ramones' 1978 "I Don't Want You" was largely Kinks-influenced.) In 1965, the Who released the mod anthem "My Generation", which according to John Reed, anticipated the kind of "cerebral mix of musical ferocity and rebellious posture" that would characterize much of the later British punk rock of the 1970s. (Note: Reed describes the Clash's emergence as a "tight ball of energy with both an image and rhetoric reminiscent of a young Pete Townshend—speed obsession, pop-art clothing, art school ambition." The Who and the Small Faces were among the few rock elders acknowledged by the Sex Pistols.) Freakbeat, a more distorted style of music, emerged as the psychedelic, British response to US garage rock and proto-punk, representing a link between the music of the 1960s counterculture and that of the later punk movement, sometimes described as "more punk than punk itself".

The garage/beat phenomenon extended beyond North America and Britain. In Peru, founded in 1964, the group Los Saicos, used fast tempos, aggressive riffing, and screamed vocals along with souped-up tracks about prison escapes, funerals and destruction which later led publications to retrospectively credit them with pioneering punk rock. In Germany, the Monks, a band consisting of several stationed American G.I.'s, infused beat music with that of raucous garage rock, releasing their sole album, Black Monk Time, in March 1966, which was later retroactively described as a precursor to punk rock.

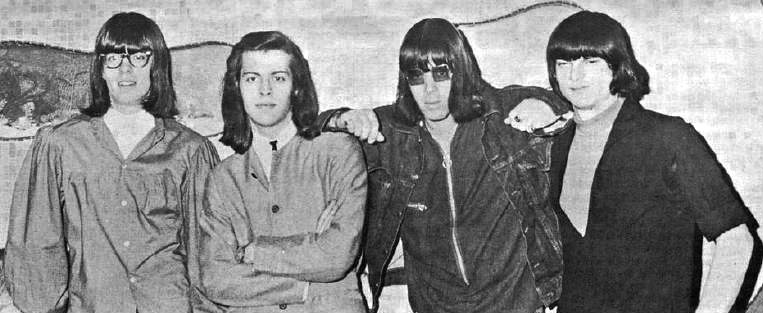
The Seeds were an early influence on Iggy Pop.

In America, the psychedelic rock movement birthed an array of garage bands that would later become influences on punk, which included a multitude of influential regional hits, by garage-psych bands like the Seeds, Music Machine, Blues Magoos, Electric Prunes and Count Five, later featured prominently on the 1972 garage rock compilation album, Nuggets, whose liner notes contained one of the earliest known uses of the term "punk rock". Additionally, the Austin Chronicle described the 13th Floor Elevators as a band who can lay claim to influencing the movement, stating "the seeds of punk remain blatant in the howling ultimatum Erickson transferred from his previous teen combo to the Elevators".

=== Proto-punk ===
==== Detroit ====
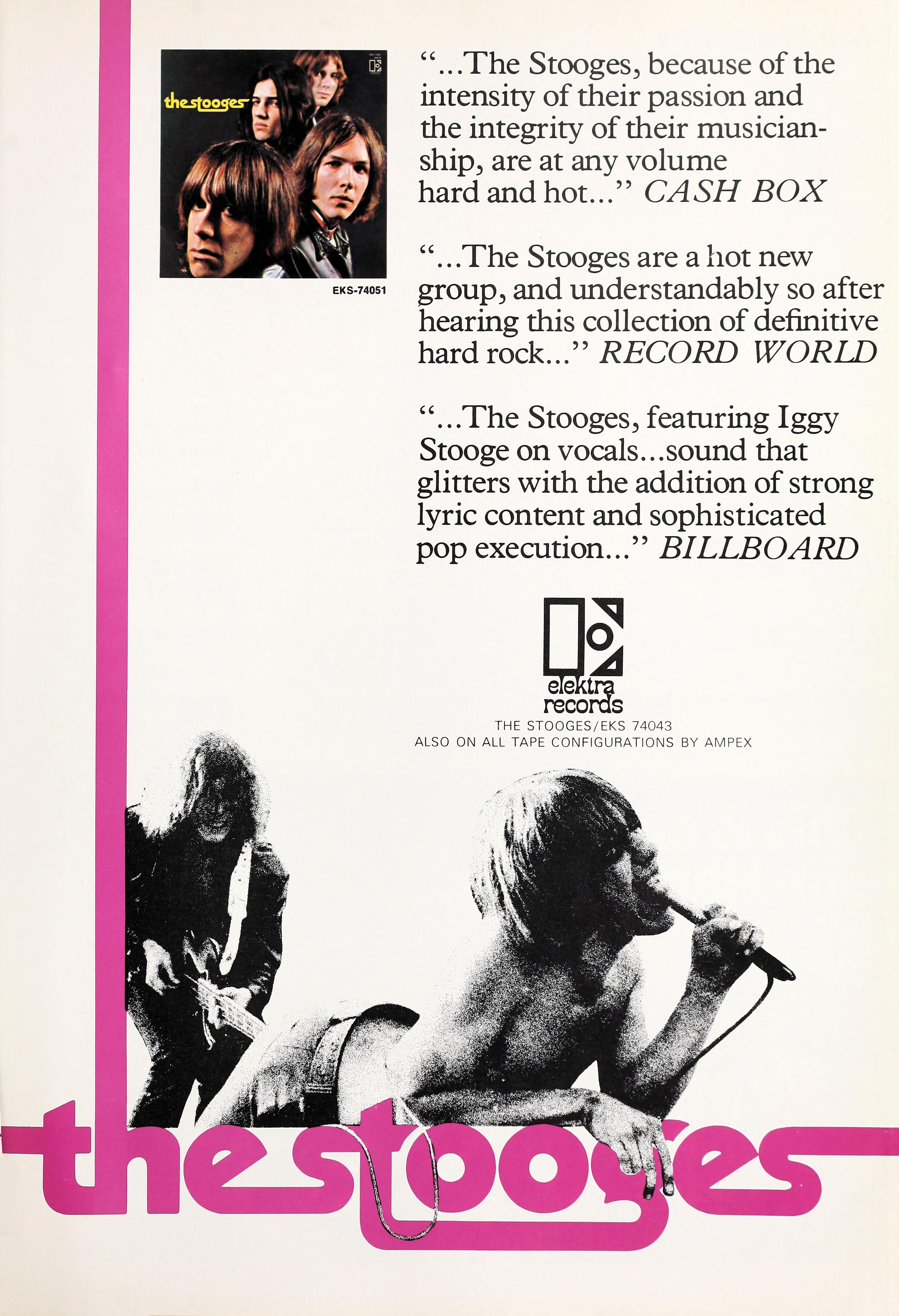
The Stooges and Iggy Pop featured in a Cashbox advertisement in August 1969

The MC5 (also known as the "Motor City Five") formed in Lincoln Park, Michigan in 1963, the group began as an R&B and garage rock band, later releasing the single "Borderline" backed with "Looking at You" in 1968 on A-Square records, without the knowledge of that label's owner Jeep Holland, the single sold out thousands of copies. Guitarist Wayne Kramer's style was retrospectively described by The Guardian as showcasing "an edge of atonality and barely controlled chaos." Similarly, the Up, formed in Michigan in 1967 were another Detroit band closely associated with the MC5 and early Detroit punk scene, they've been described as an "important step in the evolution of punk rock". In February 1969, the MC5 released their influential debut album, Kick Out the Jams, which was later considered an influential and important forerunner to punk rock music.

In August 1969, the Stooges, from Ann Arbor, premiered with a self-titled album, produced by John Cale, formerly of the Velvet Underground. The album was later followed by the release of further influential records; Fun House and Raw Power, both of which helped establish a "blueprint for punk rock". Stooges' vocalist Iggy Pop would go on to be described as "the Godfather of Punk" due to his on-stage antics and confrontational attitude. The influence of the Stooges also inspired other early Michigan punk bands such as the Dogs and the Punks. In 1973, Destroy All Monsters formed, featuring Stooges guitarist Ron Asheton and MC5 bassist Michael Davis. Followed by, early punk supergroup, the Sonic's Rendezvous Band which was formed by guitarist Fred "Sonic" Smith, formerly of the MC5, Gary Rasmussen, formerly of the Up on bass and Scott Asheton, formerly of the Stooges on drums. Additionally, Detroit band Death formed in 1974, by three African American brothers, recorded "scorching blasts of feral ur-punk". However, due to their name could not secure a record deal, they released the single "Politicians in My Eyes" backed with "Keep On Knockin" in 1976 and promptly disbanded, only to be rediscovered decades later.

==== Around the world ====
Bands anticipating the forthcoming punk movement were appearing as far afield as West Germany, where bands like Can, Faust, and Neu! emerged from the burgeoning krautrock scene. The latter's album Neu! '75, which featured songs like "Hero" and "After Eight", was influential to Johnny Rotten, Iggy Pop, and David Bowie. In Japan, the anti-establishment Zunō Keisatsu (Brain Police) mixed garage-psych and folk. The combo regularly faced censorship challenges, their live act at least once included onstage masturbation. In New York City's Lower East Side, the Fugs formed in 1963 and became an influential early proto-punk band that bridged the beat generation with rock and roll. They were followed by the Velvet Underground and hippie proto-punk David Peel, who was the first person to use the word "motherfucker" in a song title, and later influenced the Clash, and became closely aligned with the far-left Yippie movement. In Boston, the Modern Lovers formed in 1970, led by Jonathan Richman, gained attention for their garage rock sound which anticipated punk, with their self-titled album which was produced by John Cale. In Canada, early noise music group Nihilist Spasm Band formed in 1965 in London, Ontario, alongside Simply Saucer, who formed in 1973 in Hamilton, Ontario, the latter of which drew influences from the Stooges and the Velvet Underground, to form an early punk style.

== 1974–1976: Formation of first wave ==
=== North America ===
==== New York City ====
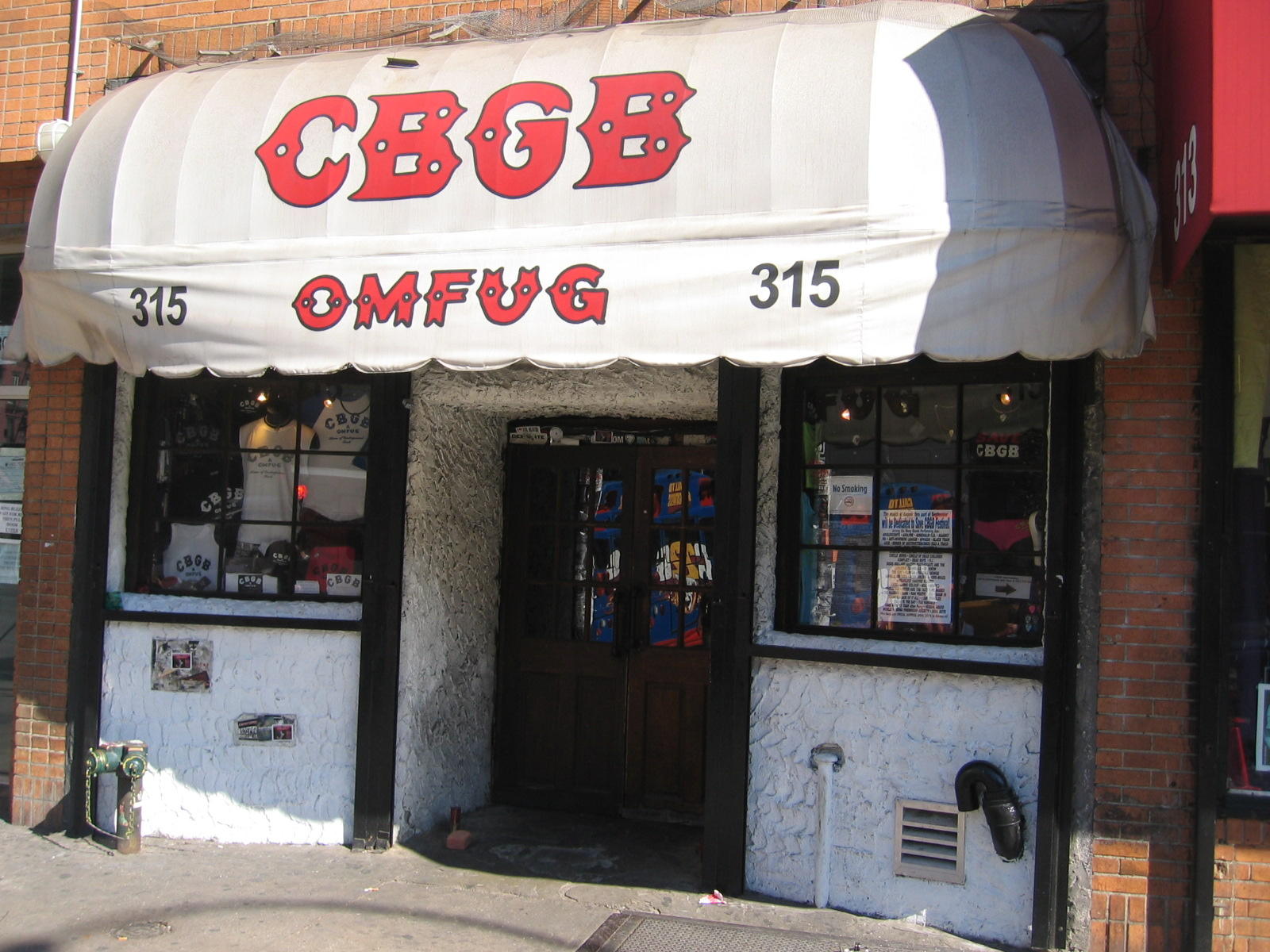
Facade of legendary music club CBGB, New York

The origins of New York's punk rock scene can be traced back to such sources as the late 1960s trash culture and an early 1970s underground rock movement centered on the Mercer Arts Center in Greenwich Village, where the New York Dolls performed, their updated form of 1950s' rock 'n' roll later became known as glam punk. The influential New York duo Suicide who formed in 1970 are credited with being one of the earliest artists to describe their music as "punk". While the Dictators, formed in 1972, became another early key band in the scene. In early 1974, a new scene began to develop around the CBGB club, also in Lower Manhattan. At its core was Television, described by critic John Walker as "the ultimate garage band with pretensions". Their influences ranged from The Velvet Underground to the staccato guitar work of Dr. Feelgood's Wilko Johnson. The band's bassist/singer, Richard Hell, created a look with cropped, ragged hair, ripped T-shirts, and black leather jackets credited as the basis for punk rock visual style. In April 1974, Patti Smith came to CBGB for the first time to see the band perform. A veteran of independent theater and performance poetry, Smith was developing an intellectual, feminist take on rock 'n' roll. On June 5, she recorded the single "Hey Joe"/"Piss Factory", featuring Television guitarist Tom Verlaine; released on her own Mer Records label, it heralded the scene's DIY ethic and has often been cited as the first punk rock record. By August, Smith and Television were gigging together at Max's Kansas City.

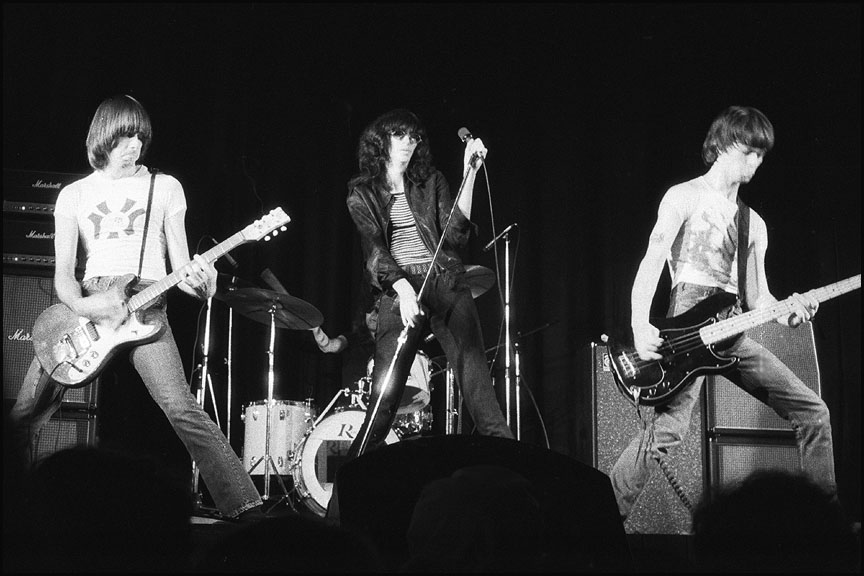
The Ramones performing in Toronto in 1976. They are often described as one of the first true punk bands, popularizing the punk movement in the United States. They are regarded as highly influential in today's punk culture.

In Forest Hills, Queens, the Ramones drew on sources ranging from the Stooges to the Beatles and the Beach Boys to Herman's Hermits and 1960s girl groups, and condensed rock 'n' roll to its primal level: "'1–2–3–4!' bass-player Dee Dee Ramone shouted at the start of every song as if the group could barely master the rudiments of rhythm." The band played its first show at CBGB in August 1974. By the end of the year, the Ramones had performed seventy-four shows, each about seventeen minutes long. "When I first saw the Ramones", critic Mary Harron later remembered, "I couldn't believe people were doing this. The dumb brattiness."

That spring, Smith and Television shared a two-month-long weekend residency at CBGB that significantly raised the club's profile. The Television sets included Richard Hell's "Blank Generation", which became the scene's emblematic anthem. Soon after, Hell left Television and founded a band featuring a more stripped-down sound, the Heartbreakers, with former New York Dolls Johnny Thunders and Jerry Nolan. In August, Television recorded a single, "Little Johnny Jewel". In the words of John Walker, the record was "a turning point for the whole New York scene" if not quite for the punk rock sound itself – Hell's departure had left the band "significantly reduced in fringe aggression". Early in 1976, Hell left the Heartbreakers to form the Voidoids, described as "one of the most harshly uncompromising [punk] bands". The Cramps, whose core members were from Sacramento, California, and Akron, Ohio, had debuted at CBGB in November 1976, opening for the Dead Boys. They were soon playing regularly at Max's Kansas City and CBGB.

At this early stage, the term punk applied to the scene in general, not necessarily a particular stylistic approach as it would later—the early New York punk bands represented a broad variety of influences. Among them, the Ramones, the Heartbreakers, Richard Hell and the Voidoids, and the Dead Boys were establishing a distinct musical style. Even where they diverged most clearly, in lyrical approach – the Ramones' apparent guilelessness at one extreme, Hell's conscious craft at the other – there was an abrasive attitude in common. Their shared attributes of minimalism and speed, however, had not yet come to define punk rock.

==== Cleveland ====
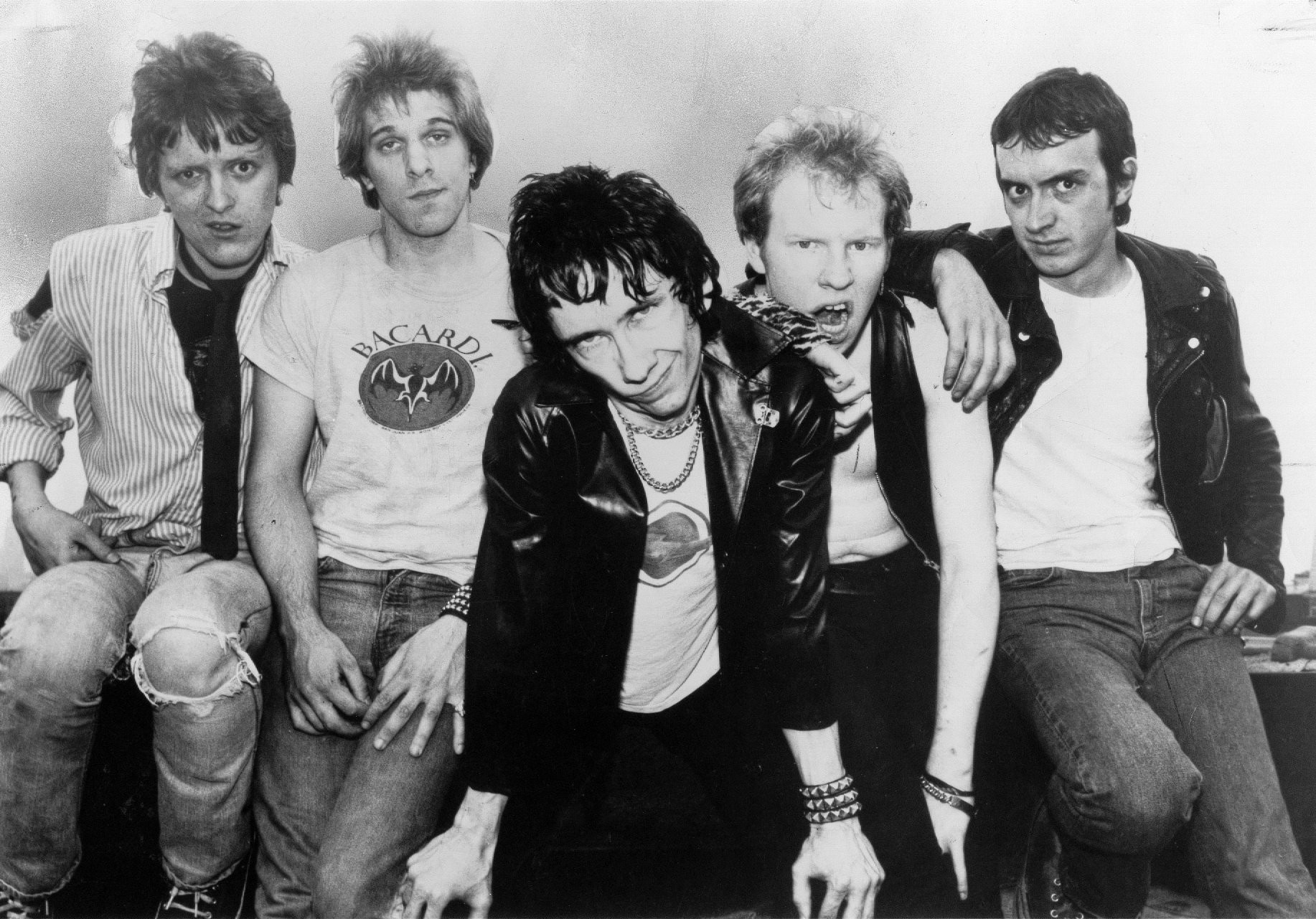
Cleveland punk band Dead Boys in 1977

During the early 1970s, the influential Ohio punk scene emerged alongside the initial New York punk rock scene in Cleveland, Ohio, which included bands like Mirrors, Electric Eels, the Styrenes and Rocket from the Tombs. Bands in the scene drew influences from the Stooges, the Velvet Underground, MC5, Captain Beefheart, and free jazz as much as traditional rock and roll. The scene began in 1974 with the proliferation of live shows which were dubbed "Extermination Night". Rocket from the Tombs later disbanded and led to the formation of Pere Ubu, with guitarist Cheetah Chrome later joining Ohio band the Dead Boys, with both bands relocating to New York City. Electric Eels drummer, Nick Knox, went on to join the Cramps, while guitarist, John D Morton allegedly was the first punk rock musician known to wear a jacket held together by safety pins. Cleveland bands like Pere Ubu, positioned themselves in opposition to the early New York punk scene. However, guitarist Peter Laughner admired the early NYC scene, routinely hanging around prominent CBGB figures like Patti Smith, Richard Hell and Tom Verlaine during the early 1970s. Laughner had also reportedly auditioned to replace Richard Hell in Television and was responsible for organizing the band's first gig outside NYC, which was played at Cleveland's Piccadilly Inn on July 24–25, 1975 and supported by Laughner's group Rocket from the Tombs.

Additionally, early Ohio punk band Devo would form spearheading the Akron Sound movement, with the Cramps briefly relocating to Akron, Ohio before settling in the early New York punk scene.

=== United Kingdom ===
After a brief period unofficially managing the New York Dolls, Briton Malcolm McLaren returned to London in May 1975, inspired by the new scene he had witnessed at CBGB. The King's Road clothing store he co-owned, recently renamed Sex, was building a reputation with its outrageous "anti-fashion". Among those who frequented the shop were members of a band called the Strand, which McLaren had also been managing. In August, the group was seeking a new lead singer. Another Sex habitué, Johnny Rotten, auditioned for and won the job. Adopting a new name, the group played its first gig as the Sex Pistols on November 6, 1975, at Saint Martin's School of Art, and soon attracted a small but dedicated following. In February 1976, the band received its first significant press coverage; guitarist Steve Jones declared that the Sex Pistols were not so much into music as they were "chaos". The band often provoked its crowds into near-riots. Rotten announced to one audience, "Bet you don't hate us as much as we hate you!" McLaren envisioned the Sex Pistols as central players in a new youth movement, "hard and tough". As described by critic Jon Savage, the band members "embodied an attitude into which McLaren fed a new set of references: late-sixties radical politics, sexual fetish material, pop history, [...] youth sociology".

Bernard Rhodes, an associate of McLaren, similarly aimed to make stars of the band London SS, who became the Clash, which was joined by Joe Strummer. On June 4, 1976 (and returning on July 20), the Sex Pistols performed at Manchester's Lesser Free Trade Hall in what became one of the most influential rock shows ever. Among the approximately thirty to forty audience members were the two locals who organised the gig Howard Devoto and Pete Shelley, who had formed the Buzzcocks after seeing the Sex Pistols in February. Others in the small crowd went on to form Joy Division, the Fall, and the Smiths, the gig would also inspire the formation of influential independent record labels, Factory and Creation Records. In July, the Ramones played two London shows that helped spark the nascent UK punk scene. Over the next several months, many new punk rock bands formed, often directly inspired by the Sex Pistols. In London, women were near the center of the scene—among the initial wave of bands were the female-fronted Siouxsie and the Banshees, X-Ray Spex, and the all-female the Slits. There were female bassists Gaye Advert in the Adverts and Shanne Bradley in the Nipple Erectors, while Sex store frontwoman Jordan not only managed Adam and the Ants but also performed screaming vocals on their song "Lou". Other groups included Subway Sect, Alternative TV, Wire, the Stranglers, Eater and Generation X. Farther afield, Sham 69 began practicing in the southeastern town of Hersham. In Durham, there was Penetration, with lead singer Pauline Murray. On September 20–21, the 100 Club Punk Festival in London featured the Sex Pistols, Clash, Damned, and Buzzcocks, as well as Paris's female-lead Stinky Toys. Siouxsie and the Banshees and Subway Sect debuted on the festival's first night. On the festival's second night, audience member Sid Vicious was arrested for having thrown a glass at the Damned that shattered and destroyed a girl's eye. Press coverage of the incident reinforced punk's reputation as a social menace.

Some new bands, such as London's Ultravox!, Edinburgh's Rezillos, Manchester's the Fall, and Leamington's the Shapes, identified with the scene even as they pursued more experimental music. Others of a comparatively traditional rock 'n' roll bent were also swept up by the movement: the Vibrators, formed as a pub rock–style act in February 1976, soon adopted a punk look and sound. A few even longer-active bands including Surrey neo-mods the Jam and pub rockers Eddie and the Hot Rods, the Stranglers, and Cock Sparrer also became associated with the punk rock scene. Alongside the musical roots shared with their American counterparts and the calculated confrontationalism of the early Who, the British punks also reflected the influence of glam rock and related artists and bands such as David Bowie, Slade, T.Rex, and Roxy Music. However, Sex Pistols frontman Johnny Rotten (real name John Lydon) insisted that the influences of the UK punk scene were not from the US and NY. "I've heard an awful lot of American journalists pretending that the whole punk influence came out of New York." He argued: "T. Rex, David Bowie, Slade, Mott The Hoople, the Alex Harvey Band—their influence was enormous. And they try to write that all off and wrap it around Patti Smith. It's so wrong!".

=== Australia ===
A punk subculture began in Australia around the same time, centered around Radio Birdman and the Oxford Tavern in Sydney's Darlinghurst suburb. By 1976, the Saints were hiring Brisbane local halls to use as venues, or playing in "Club 76", their shared house in the inner suburb of Petrie Terrace. Inspired mainly by the Stooges and MC5, they drew influences from Australian garage rock band the Missing Links, and evoked the live sound of the British band The Pretty Things, who had toured Australia and New Zealand in 1975. In Perth, the Cheap Nasties formed in August.

The Saints soon discovered that musicians were exploring similar paths in other parts of the world. Ed Kuepper, co-founder of the Saints, later recalled:

One thing I remember having had a really depressing effect on me was the first Ramones album. When I heard it [in 1976], I mean it was a great record [...] but I hated it because I knew we'd been doing this sort of stuff for years. There was even a chord progression on that album that we used [...] and I thought, "Fuck. We're going to be labeled as influenced by the Ramones", when nothing could have been further from the truth.

== 1976–1977: Breakthrough and peak of first wave ==
A second wave of punk rock emerged in 1977. These bands often sounded very different from each other. While punk remained largely an underground phenomenon in the US, in the UK it had become a major sensation. During this period punk music also spread beyond the English speaking world, inspiring local scenes in other countries.

=== North America ===
In April 1976, the Ramones' debut album was released by Sire Records; the first single was "Blitzkrieg Bop", opening with the rallying cry "Hey! Ho! Let's go!" According to a later description, "Like all cultural watersheds, Ramones was embraced by a discerning few and slagged off as a bad joke by the uncomprehending majority."

By 1977, downtown New York bands such as Teenage Jesus and the Jerks and James Chance and the Contortions led what would later become known as no wave. The Misfits formed in nearby New Jersey. Still developing what would become their signature B movie–inspired style, later dubbed horror punk, they made their first appearance at CBGB in April 1977. Subsequently, the Californian punk scene would later emerge, primarily centered in Los Angeles with bands such as the Weirdos, The Dils, the Zeros, the Bags, Black Randy and the Metrosquad, the Germs, Fear, The Go-Go's, X, the Dickies, and the relocated Tupperwares, now dubbed the Screamers. San Francisco's punk scene included the Avengers, The Nuns, Negative Trend, the Mutants, and the Sleepers.

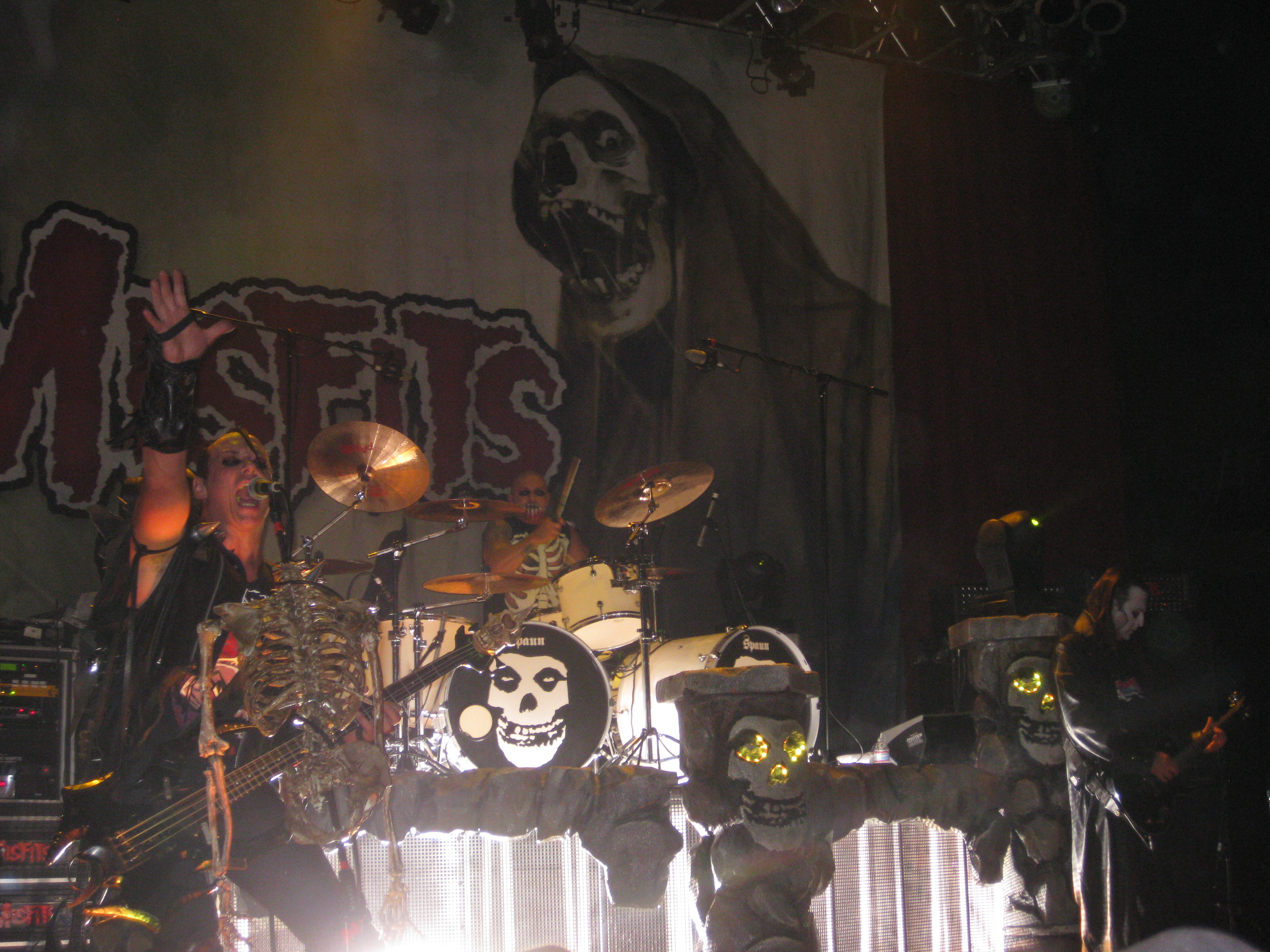
The Misfits developed a "horror punk" style in New Jersey.

The Dead Boys' debut LP, Young, Loud and Snotty, was released at the end of August. October saw two more debut albums from the scene: Richard Hell and the Voidoids' first full-length, Blank Generation, and the Heartbreakers' L.A.M.F. One track on the latter exemplified both the scene's close-knit character and the popularity of heroin within it: "Chinese Rocks"—the title refers to a strong form of the drug – was written by Dee Dee Ramone and Hell, both users, as were the Heartbreakers' Thunders and Nolan. (During the Heartbreakers' 1976 and 1977 tours of Britain, Thunders played a central role in popularizing heroin among the punk crowd there, as well.) The Ramones' third album, Rocket to Russia, appeared in November 1977.

In December 1977, Black Flag performed for the first time in a garage in Redondo Beach, though they initially formed in Hermosa Beach in 1976 under the name Panic. They later became influential in the development of hardcore punk.

=== United Kingdom ===
"Anarchy in the U.K."
With its "inflammatory, venomous lyrics [and] crude energy", the Sex Pistols' debut single "Anarchy in the U.K." "established punk's modus operandi". Producer Chris Thomas layered multiple tracks of Steve Jones's guitar to create a "searing wall of sound", while Johnny Rotten spewed the vocals "as if his teeth had been ground down to points."

In October 1976, the Damned released the first UK punk rock band single, "New Rose". The Vibrators followed the next month with "We Vibrate". On November 26, 1976, the Sex Pistols' released their debut single "Anarchy in the U.K.", which succeeded in its goal of becoming a "national scandal". Jamie Reid's "anarchy flag" poster and his other design work for the Sex Pistols helped establish a distinctive punk visual aesthetic.

On December 1, 1976, an incident took place that sealed punk rock's notorious reputation, when the Sex Pistols and several members of the Bromley Contingent, including Siouxsie Sioux and Steven Severin, filled a vacancy for Queen on the early evening Thames Television London television show Today to be interviewed by host Bill Grundy. When Grundy asked Siouxsie how she was doing, she made fun of him saying, "I've always wanted to meet you, Bill". Grundy, who was drunk, told her on the air; "we shall meet afterwards then". This instantly generated a reaction from Sex Pistols guitarist Steve Jones who pronounced a series of terms inappropriate for prime-time television. Jones proceeded to call Grundy a "dirty bastard", a "dirty fucker", and a "fucking rotter", triggering a media controversy. The episode had a major impact on the history of the scene and the punk term became a household name in 24 hours thanks to the press coverage, and several front covers of newspapers. Two days later, the Sex Pistols, the Clash, the Damned, and the Heartbreakers set out on the Anarchy Tour, a series of gigs throughout the UK. Many of the shows were cancelled by venue owners in response to the media outrage following the Grundy interview.

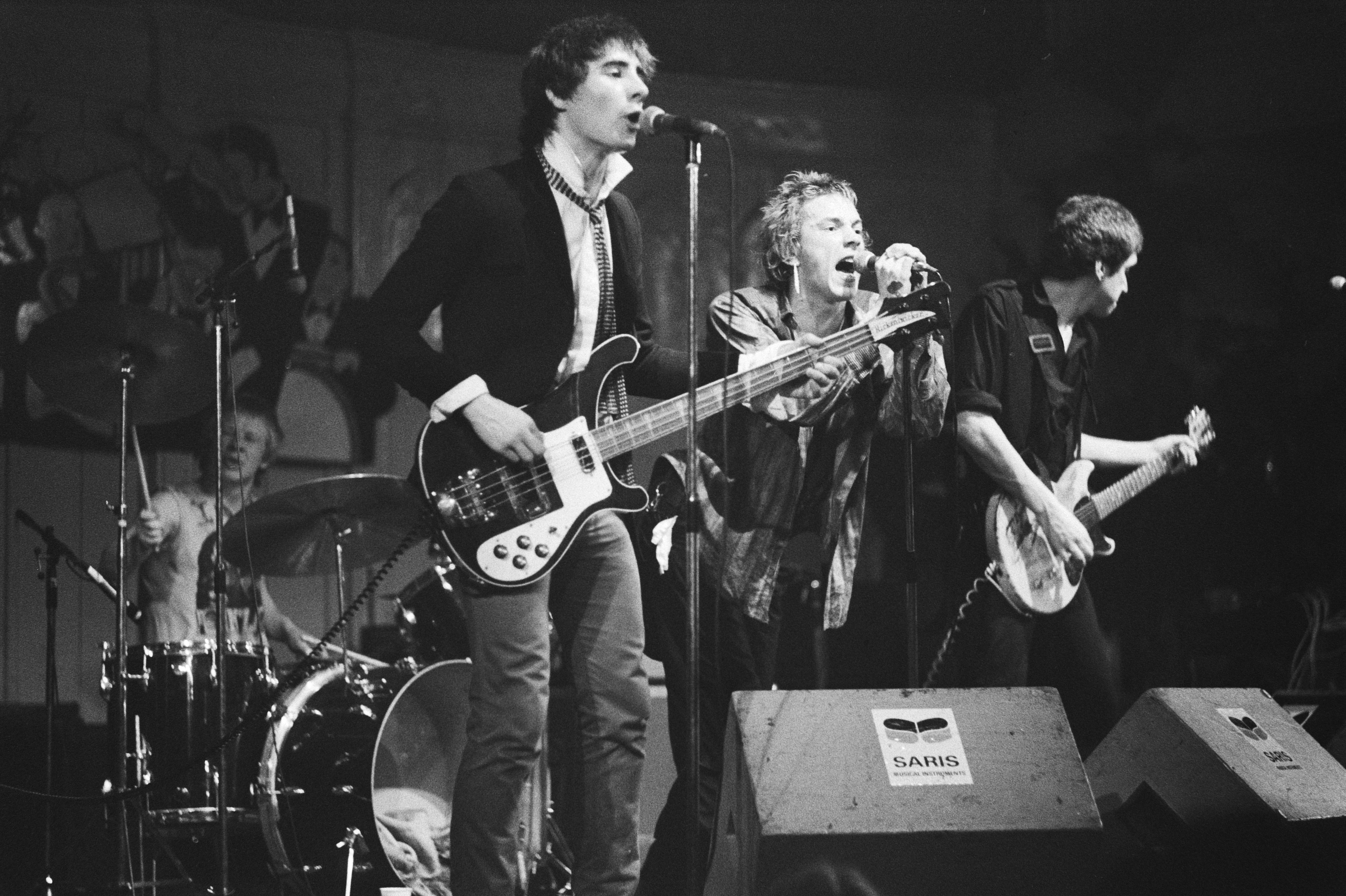
Vocalist Johnny Rotten of the Sex Pistols flanked by guitarists Glen Matlock and Steve Jones, in front of drummer Paul Cook

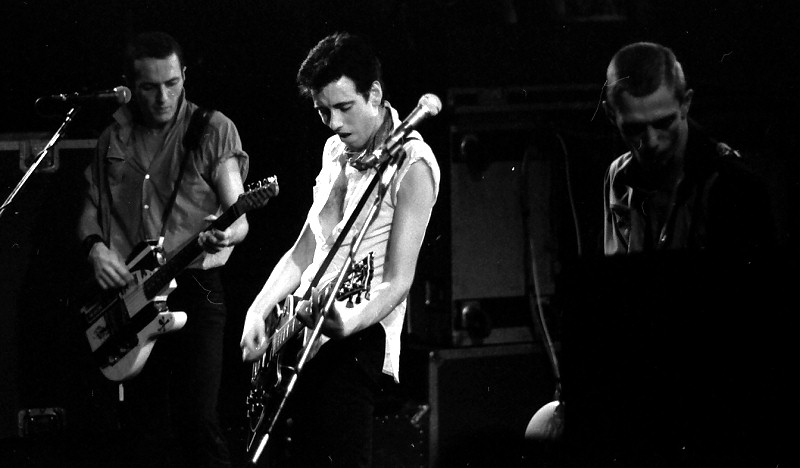
The Clash performing in 1980

The Pistols' live TV skirmish with Bill Grundy was the signal moment in British punk's transformation into a major media phenomenon, even as some stores refused to stock the records and radio airplay was hard to come by. Press coverage of punk misbehavior grew intense: On January 4, 1977, The Evening News of London ran a front-page story on how the Sex Pistols "vomited and spat their way to an Amsterdam flight". In February 1977, the first album by a British punk band appeared: Damned Damned Damned (by the Damned) reached number thirty-six on the UK chart. The EP Spiral Scratch, self-released by Manchester's Buzzcocks, was a benchmark for both the DIY ethic and regionalism in the country's punk movement. The Clash's self-titled debut album came out two months later and rose to number twelve; the single "White Riot" entered the top forty. In May, the Sex Pistols achieved new heights of controversy (and number two on the singles chart) with "God Save the Queen". The band had recently acquired a new bassist, Sid Vicious, who was seen as exemplifying the punk persona. The swearing during the Grundy interview and the controversy over "God Save the Queen" led to a moral panic.

Scores of new punk groups formed around the United Kingdom, as far from London as Belfast's Stiff Little Fingers and Dunfermline, Scotland's the Skids. Though most survived only briefly, perhaps recording a small-label single or two, others set off new trends. Crass, from Essex, merged a vehement, straight-ahead punk rock style with a committed anarchist mission, and played a major role in the emerging anarcho-punk movement. Sham 69, London's Menace, and the Angelic Upstarts from South Shields in the Northeast combined a similarly stripped-down sound with populist lyrics, a style that became known as street punk. These expressly working-class bands contrasted with others in the second wave that presaged the post-punk phenomenon. Liverpool's first punk group, Big in Japan, moved in a glam, theatrical direction. The band did not survive long, but it spun off several well-known post-punk acts. The songs of London's Wire were characterized by sophisticated lyrics, minimalist arrangements, and extreme brevity.

The Clash's debut had included a cover of the recent Jamaican reggae hit "Police and Thieves". Other first wave bands such as the Slits and new entrants to the scene like the Ruts and the Police interacted with the reggae and ska subcultures, incorporating their rhythms and production styles. The punk rock phenomenon helped spark a full-fledged ska revival movement known as 2 Tone, centered on bands such as the Specials, the Beat, Madness, and the Selecter. In July, the Sex Pistols' third single, "Pretty Vacant", reached number six and Australia's the Saints had a top-forty hit with "This Perfect Day".

In September, Generation X and the Clash reached the top forty with, respectively, "Your Generation" and "Complete Control". X-Ray Spex's "Oh Bondage Up Yours!" did not chart, but it became a requisite item for punk fans. The BBC banned "Oh Bondage Up Yours!" due to its controversial lyrics. In October, the Sex Pistols hit number eight with "Holidays in the Sun", followed by the release of their first and only "official" album, Never Mind the Bollocks, Here's the Sex Pistols. Inspiring yet another round of controversy, it topped the British charts. In December, one of the first books about punk rock was published: The Boy Looked at Johnny, by Julie Burchill and Tony Parsons. (Note: The title echoes a lyric from the title track of Patti Smith's 1975 album Horses.)

=== Australia ===
In September 1976, the Saints became the first punk rock band outside the U.S. to release a recording, the single "(I'm) Stranded". The band self-financed, packaged, and distributed the single. "(I'm) Stranded" had limited impact at home, but the British music press recognized it as groundbreaking.

In February 1977, EMI released the Saints' debut album, (I'm) Stranded, which the band recorded in two days. The Saints had relocated to Sydney; in April, they and Radio Birdman united for a major gig at Paddington Town Hall. Last Words had also formed in the city. The following month, the Saints relocated again, to Great Britain. In June, Radio Birdman released the album Radios Appear on its own Trafalgar label.

== 1977–1984: Schism and diversification ==
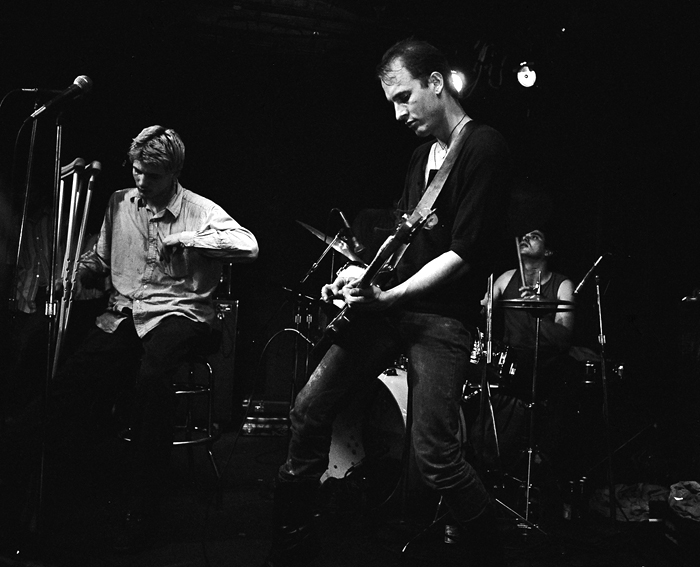
Flipper, performing in 1984

By 1979, the hardcore punk movement was emerging in Southern California. A rivalry developed between adherents of the new sound and the older punk rock crowd. Hardcore, appealing to a younger, more suburban audience, was perceived by some as anti-intellectual, overly violent, and musically limited. In Los Angeles, the opposing factions were often described as "Hollywood punks" and "beach punks", referring to Hollywood's central position in the original L.A. punk rock scene and to hardcore's popularity in the shoreline communities of South Bay and Orange County.

In contrast to North America, more of the bands from the original British punk movement remained active, sustaining extended careers even as their styles evolved and diverged. Meanwhile, the Oi! and anarcho-punk movements were emerging. Musically in the same aggressive vein as American hardcore, they addressed different constituencies with overlapping but distinct anti-establishment messages. As described by Dave Laing, "The model for self-proclaimed punk after 1978 derived from the Ramones via the eight-to-the-bar rhythms most characteristic of the Vibrators and Clash [...] It became essential to sound one particular way to be recognized as a 'punk band' now." In February 1979, former Sex Pistols bassist Sid Vicious died of a heroin overdose in New York. If the Sex Pistols' breakup the previous year had marked the end of the original UK punk scene and its promise of cultural transformation, for many the death of Vicious signified that it had been doomed from the start.

By the turn of the decade, the punk rock movement had split deeply along cultural and musical lines. The "Great Schism" of punk occurred right as the 1980s were approaching, when melodic new wave artists began to separate themselves from hardcore punk. This left a variety of derivative scenes and forms. On one side were new wave and post-punk artists; some adopted more accessible musical styles and gained broad popularity, while some turned in more experimental, less commercial directions. On the other side, hardcore punk, Oi!, and anarcho-punk bands became closely linked with underground cultures and spun off an array of subgenres. Somewhere in between, pop-punk groups created blends like that of the ideal record, as defined by Mekons cofounder Kevin Lycett: "a cross between ABBA and the Sex Pistols". A range of other styles emerged, many of them fusions with long-established genres. The Clash album London Calling, released in December 1979, exemplified the breadth of classic punk's legacy. Combining punk rock with reggae, ska, R&B, and rockabilly, it went on to be acclaimed as one of the best rock records ever. At the same time, as observed by Flipper singer Bruce Loose, the relatively restrictive hardcore scenes diminished the variety of music that could once be heard at many punk gigs. If early punk, like most rock scenes, was ultimately male-oriented, the hardcore and Oi! scenes were significantly more so, marked in part by the slam dancing and moshing with which they became identified.

=== New wave ===
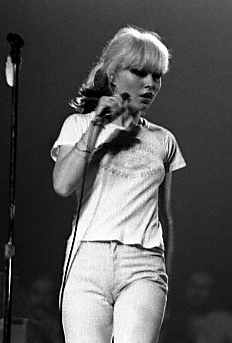
Debbie Harry performing in Toronto in 1977

In 1976—first in London, then in the United States—"New Wave" was introduced as a complementary label for the formative scenes and groups also known as "punk"; the two terms were essentially interchangeable. NME journalist Roy Carr is credited with proposing the term's use (adopted from the cinematic French New Wave of the 1960s) in this context. Over time, "new wave" acquired a distinct meaning: bands such as Blondie and Talking Heads from the CBGB scene; the Cars, who emerged from music venue The Rat in Boston; the Go-Go's in Los Angeles; and the Police in London that were broadening their instrumental palette, incorporating dance-oriented rhythms, and working with more polished production were specifically designated "new wave" and no longer called "punk". Dave Laing suggests that some punk-identified British acts pursued the new wave label to avoid radio censorship and make themselves more palatable to concert bookers. In the UK, the new wave era is associated with the late 1970s and new wave's popularity is considered to have peaked in 1979.

Bringing elements of punk rock music and fashion into more pop-oriented, less "dangerous" styles, new wave artists became very popular on both sides of the Atlantic, first in the UK and then in the US, with some of the same artists at first but later diverging, as some in the US adopted "new wave" as a general term for 1980s British pop. "New Music" became a catch-all term in the US, encompassing disparate styles such as 2 Tone ska, the mod revival inspired by the Jam, the sophisticated pop-rock of Elvis Costello and XTC, the New Romantic phenomenon typified by Ultravox, synthpop groups like Tubeway Army (which had started out as a straight-ahead punk band) and The Human League, and the sui generis subversions of Devo, who had gone "beyond punk before punk even properly existed". New music/new wave crossed into the mainstream with the debut of the cable television network MTV in 1981, which put many new wave videos into regular rotation.

=== Post-punk ===
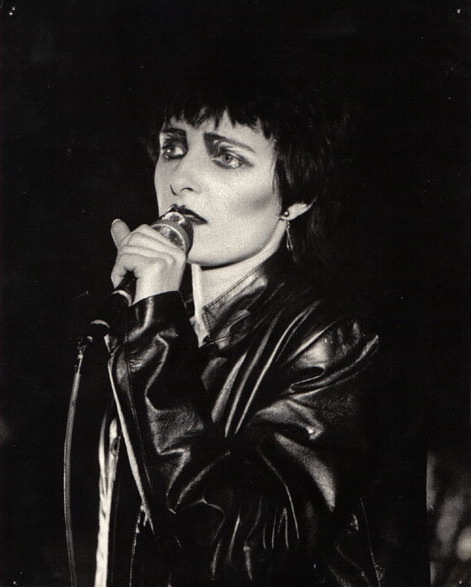
Siouxsie Sioux performing in Edinburgh in 1980

During the late 1970s, the post-punk scene emerged as a rejection of punk's raw and simplistic conventions, instead incorporating broader and more experimental influences. On 4 June 1976, the Sex Pistols' concert at Manchester's Lesser Free Trade Hall inspired future members of Joy Division, the Fall, Buzzcocks, Magazine and the Smiths to form their own bands, as well as influencing the formation of independent record labels, Factory and Creation Records, both of which contributed to the development of the production and distribution infrastructure of the indie music scene of the 1980s. The concept of post-punk was outlined in Jon Savage's editorial for the "New Musick" issue of Sounds magazine published on the 26 November 1977. In the editorial, Savage described bands such as Devo, Pere Ubu, Throbbing Gristle, Subway Sect, the Prefects, Siouxsie and the Banshees, and the Slits as early examples of post-punk. Post-punk was later further proliferated by other notable bands such as Wire, Public Image Ltd, the Pop Group, the Raincoats, Gang of Four, and the Cure.

These bands were often experimental, incorporating an array of influences that ranged from krautrock, funk, electronic music, jazz, dub and disco to Syd Barrett-era Pink Floyd as well as the art rock, glam rock and experimental rock music of the Velvet Underground, Captain Beefheart, Roxy Music, Brian Eno, as well as Iggy Pop's the Idiot and David Bowie's Berlin Trilogy.

Although post-punk was largely a British movement, the scene had roots in the United States. Notable American post-punk bands included Pere Ubu, Devo, Television, Mission of Burma, Talking Heads, Suburban Lawns, Chrome and MX-80 Sound. The no wave movement that developed in New York in the late 1970s, with artists such as Lydia Lunch and James Chance, was birthed as an opposition to commercialized new wave music. In 1980, Australian post-punk band the Birthday Party relocated to London and later evolved into Nick Cave and the Bad Seeds. Melbourne's Little band scene further proliferated post-punk and gave rise to acts such as Dead Can Dance. The original post-punk movement became highly influential to 1990s and 2000s alternative rock music, inspiring the subsequent post-punk revival scene in New York.

=== Hardcore ===
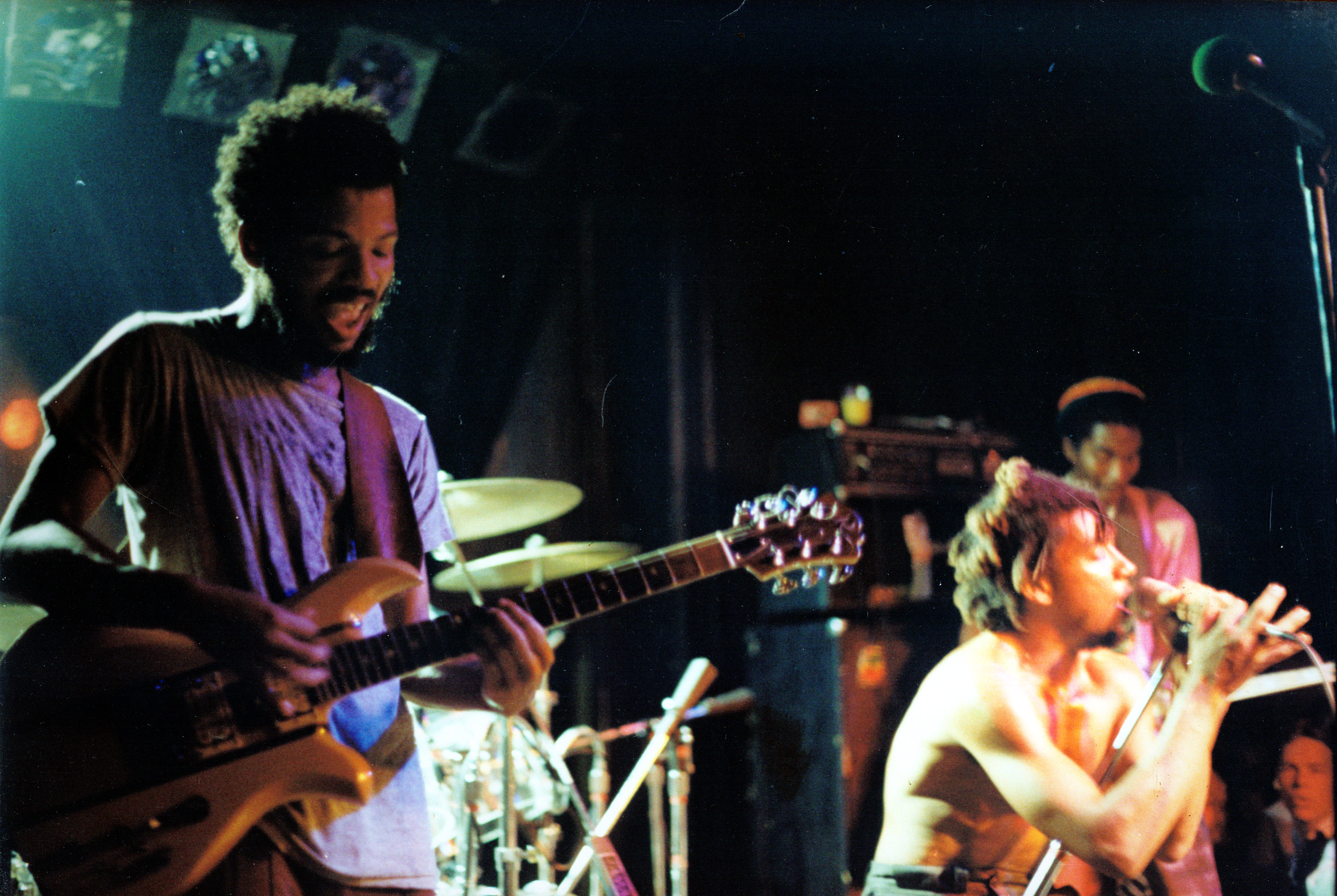
Bad Brains at 9:30 Club, Washington, D.C., 1983

A distinctive style of punk, characterized by superfast, aggressive beats, screaming vocals, and often politically aware lyrics, began to emerge in 1978 among bands scattered around the United States and Canada. The first major scene of what came to be known as hardcore punk developed in Southern California in 1978–79, initially around such punk bands as the Germs and Fear. The movement soon spread around North America and internationally. According to author Steven Blush, "Hardcore comes from the bleak suburbs of America. Parents moved their kids out of the cities to these horrible suburbs to save them from the 'reality' of the cities and what they ended up with was this new breed of monster". In 1981, hardcore punk was exposed to mainstream television audiences following a live performance from Fear on Saturday Night Live, which prompted a live-broadcast riot and mosh pit, which included members of the emerging hardcore scene such as Ian MacKaye, Harley Flanagan, Tesco Vee, and John Brannon.

Among the earliest hardcore bands, regarded as having made the first recordings in the style, were Southern California's Middle Class and Black Flag. Bad Brains—all of whom were black, a rarity in punk of any era – launched the D.C. scene with their rapid-paced single "Pay to Cum" in 1980. Other early hardcore-associated groups included San Francisco's Dead Kennedys, Vancouver's D.O.A., and Austin's Big Boys. They were soon joined by bands such as the Minutemen, Descendents, and Circle Jerks in Southern California; D.C.'s Minor Threat and State of Alert; and Austin's MDC. By 1981, hardcore was the dominant punk rock style not only in California but much of the rest of North America as well. A New York hardcore scene grew, including the relocated Bad Brains, New Jersey's Misfits and Adrenalin O.D., and local acts such as the Mob, Reagan Youth, and Agnostic Front. Beastie Boys, who would become famous as a hip-hop group, debuted that year as a hardcore band. They were followed by the Cro-Mags, Murphy's Law, and Leeway. By 1983, St. Paul's Hüsker Dü, Willful Neglect, Chicago's Naked Raygun, Indianapolis's Zero Boys, and D.C.'s the Faith were taking the hardcore sound in experimental and ultimately more melodic directions. Hardcore would constitute the American punk rock standard throughout the decade. The lyrical content of hardcore songs is often critical of commercial culture and middle-class values, as in Dead Kennedys' celebrated "Holiday in Cambodia" (1980).

Straight edge bands like Minor Threat, Boston's SS Decontrol, and Reno, Nevada's 7 Seconds rejected the self-destructive lifestyles of their peers, and built a movement based on positivity and abstinence from cigarettes, alcohol, drugs, and casual sex.

Skate punk innovators pointed in other directions: including Venice, California's Suicidal Tendencies who had a formative effect on the heavy metal–influenced crossover thrash style. Toward the middle of the decade, D.R.I spawned the superfast thrashcore genre.

== 1984–present: Further developments ==
=== Alternative rock ===
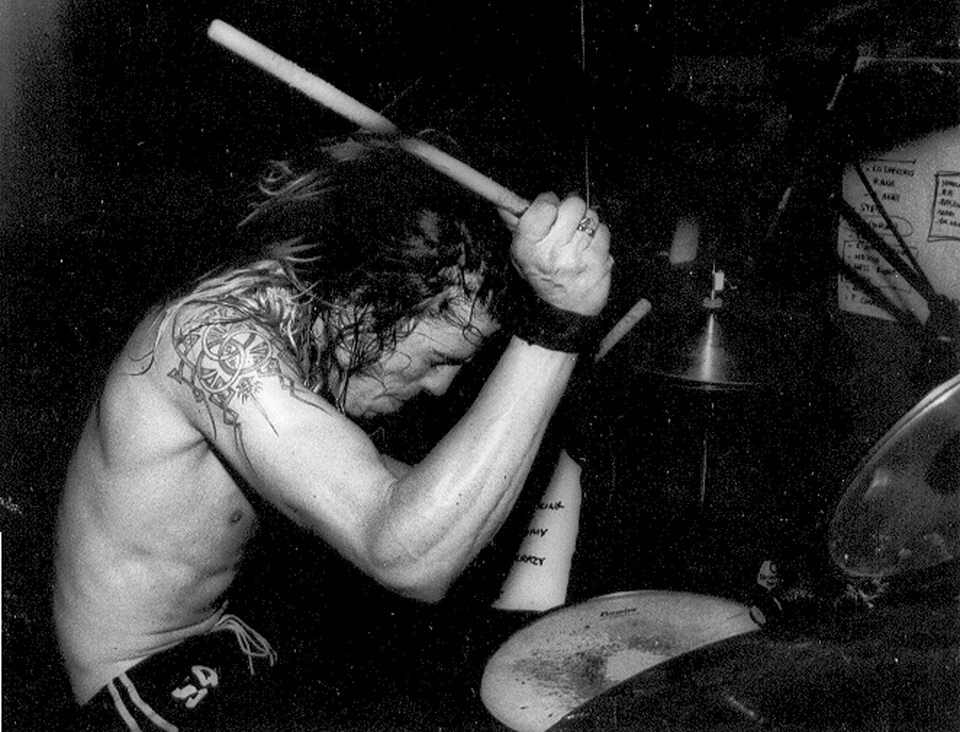
Dave Grohl, later of Nirvana, in 1989

The underground punk rock movement inspired countless bands that either evolved from a punk rock sound or brought its outsider spirit to very different kinds of music. The original punk explosion also had a long-term effect on the music industry, spurring the growth of the independent sector. In the United States, bands such as Hüsker Dü and their Minneapolis protégés the Replacements bridged the gap between punk rock genres like hardcore and the more melodic, explorative realm of what was then called "college rock".

In 1985, Rolling Stone declared that "Primal punk is passé. The best of the American punk rockers have moved on. They have learned how to play their instruments. They have discovered melody, guitar solos and lyrics that are more than shouted political slogans. Some of them have even discovered the Grateful Dead." By the mid-to-late 1980s, these bands, who had largely eclipsed their punk rock and post-punk forebears in popularity, were classified broadly as alternative rock. Alternative rock encompasses a diverse set of styles—including indie rock, gothic rock, dream pop, shoegaze, and grunge, among others—unified by their debt to punk rock and their origins outside of the musical mainstream.

As American alternative bands like Sonic Youth, which had grown out of the "no-wave" scene, and Boston's Pixies started to gain larger audiences, major labels sought to capitalize on the underground market. In 1991, Nirvana emerged from Washington State's underground, DIY grunge scene; after recording their first album, Bleach in 1989 for about $600, the band achieved huge (and unexpected) commercial success with its second album, Nevermind. The band's members cited punk rock as a key influence on their style. "Punk is musical freedom", wrote frontman Kurt Cobain. "It's saying, doing, and playing what you want." Nirvana's success opened the door to mainstream popularity for a wide range of other "left-of-the-dial" acts, such as Pearl Jam and Red Hot Chili Peppers, and fueled the alternative rock boom of the early and mid-1990s.

=== Metal–rap–punk fusion ===
During the early 1990s, new alternative forms of punk rock began to fuse with heavy metal and hip-hop. Rage Against the Machine released their eponymous debut studio album Rage Against the Machine in November 1992, to commercial and critical acclaim. The band presented itself with politically themed, revolutionary lyrical content, accompanied by the aggressive vocal delivery of lead singer Zack de la Rocha. Rage Against the Machine would go on to achieve back-to-back number 1 debuts on the Billboard 200, with their second studio album, Evil Empire (1996), and their third studio album, The Battle of Los Angeles (1999).

In a 2016 interview with Audio Ink Radio, Rage Against the Machine bassist Tim Commerford was asked about the band's status as a punk band:

Rage is a punk band. We were a punk band and our ethics were punk. We didn't do anything that anyone wanted us to do. We only did what we wanted to do and that is the essence of punk rock.

— Tim Commerford

=== Queercore ===
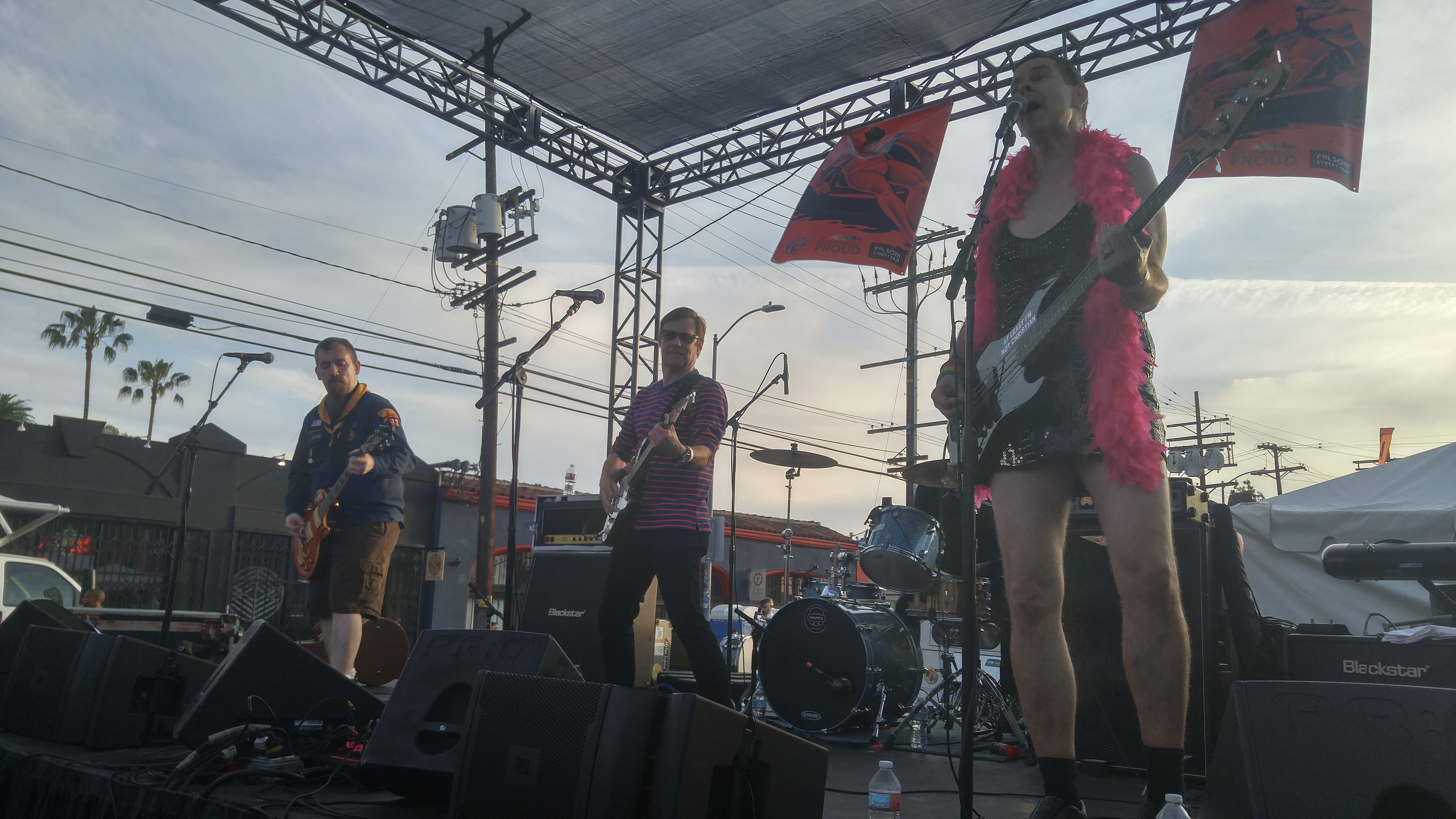
Queercore band Pansy Division performing in 2016

In the 1990s, the queercore movement developed around a number of punk bands with gay, lesbian, bisexual, or genderqueer members such as God Is My Co-Pilot, Pansy Division, Team Dresch, and Sister George. Inspired by openly gay punk musicians of an earlier generation such as Jayne County, Phranc, and Randy Turner, and bands like Nervous Gender, the Screamers, and Coil, queercore embraces a variety of punk and other alternative music styles. Queercore lyrics often treat the themes of prejudice, sexual identity, gender identity, and individual rights. The movement has continued into the 21st century, supported by festivals such as Queeruption.

=== Riot grrrl ===
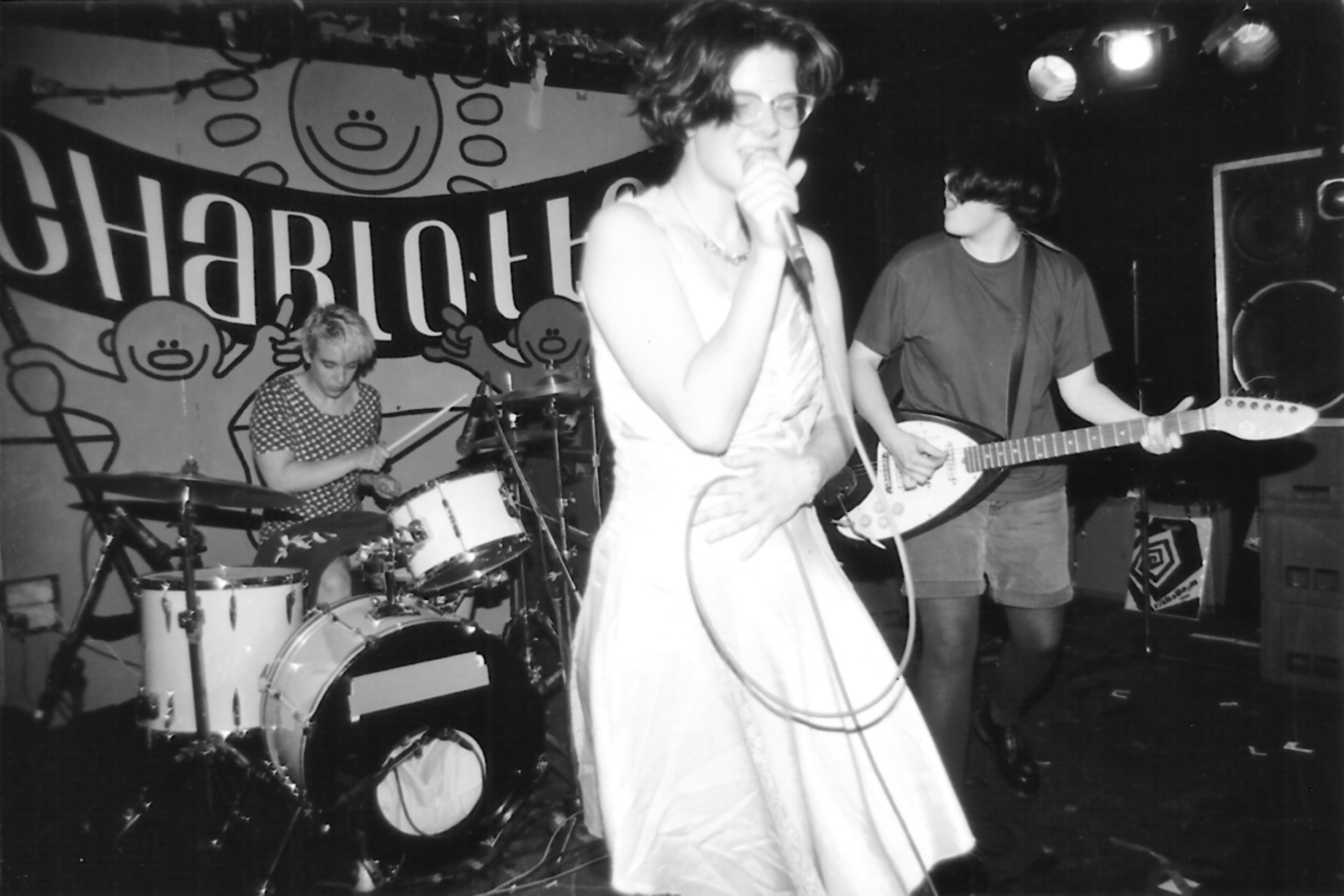
Riot grrrl band Bratmobile in 1994

The riot grrrl movement, a significant aspect in the formation of the Third Wave feminist movement, was organized by taking the values and rhetoric of punk and using it to convey feminist messages.

In 1991, a concert of female-led bands at the International Pop Underground Convention in Olympia, Washington, heralded the emerging riot grrrl phenomenon. Billed as "Love Rock Revolution Girl Style Now", the concert's lineup included Bikini Kill, Bratmobile, Heavens to Betsy, L7, and Mecca Normal. The riot grrrl movement foregrounded feminist concerns and progressive politics in general; the DIY ethic and fanzines were also central elements of the scene. This movement relied on media and technology to spread their ideas and messages, creating a cultural-technological space for feminism to voice their concerns. They embodied the punk perspective, taking the anger and emotions and creating a separate culture from it. With riot grrrl, they were grounded in girl punk past but also rooted in modern feminism. Tammy Rae Carbund, from Mr. Lady Records, explains that without riot grrrl bands, "[women] would have all starved to death culturally."

Singer-guitarists Corin Tucker of Heavens to Betsy and Carrie Brownstein of Excuse 17, bands active in both the queercore and riot grrrl scenes, cofounded the indie/punk band Sleater-Kinney in 1994. Bikini Kill's lead singer, Kathleen Hanna, the iconic figure of riot grrrl, moved on to form the art punk group Le Tigre in 1998.

=== Pop-punk and mainstream success ===
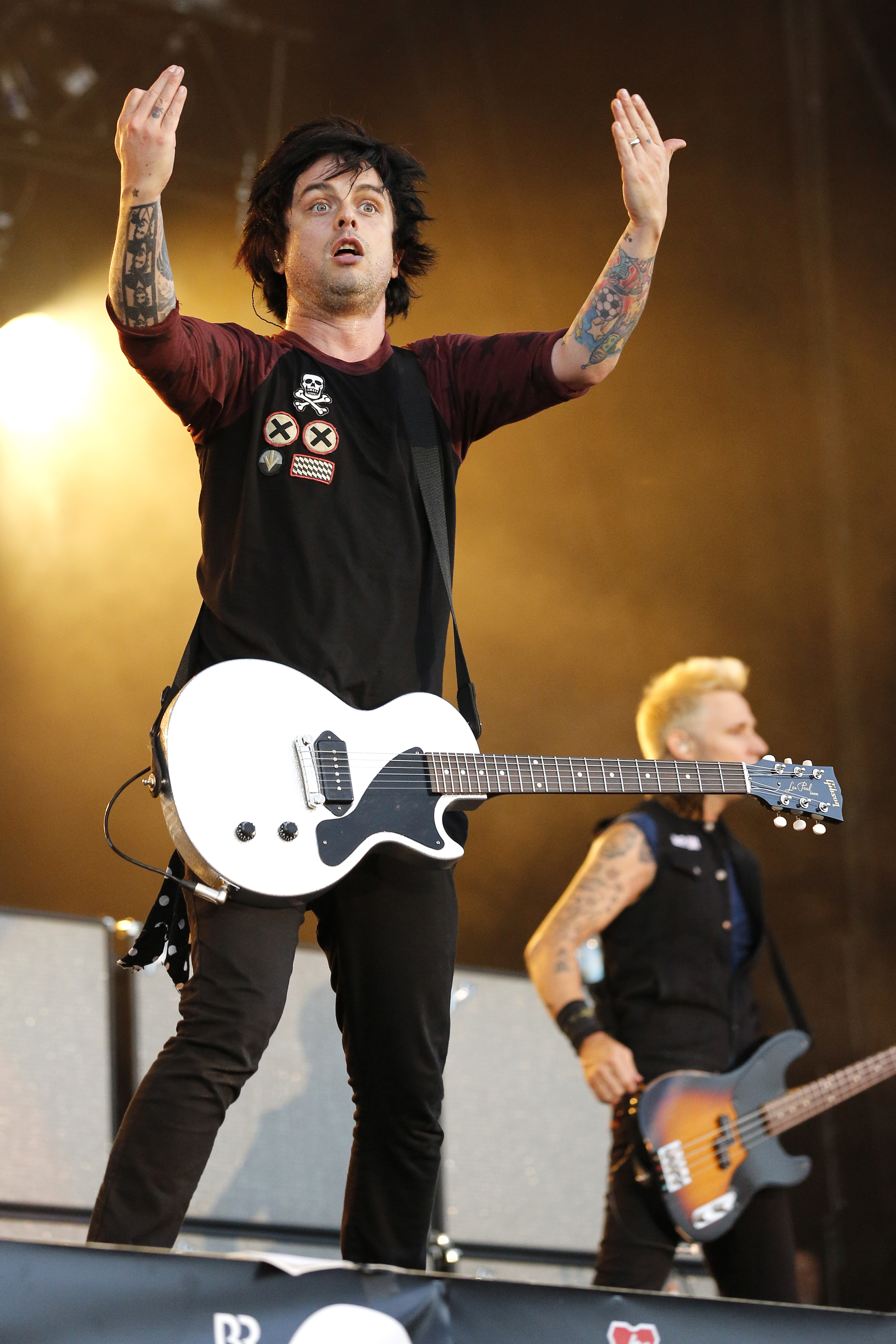
Green Day frontman Billie Joe Armstrong, with bassist Mike Dirnt to the right. Green Day is credited with reviving mainstream interest in punk rock in the United States.

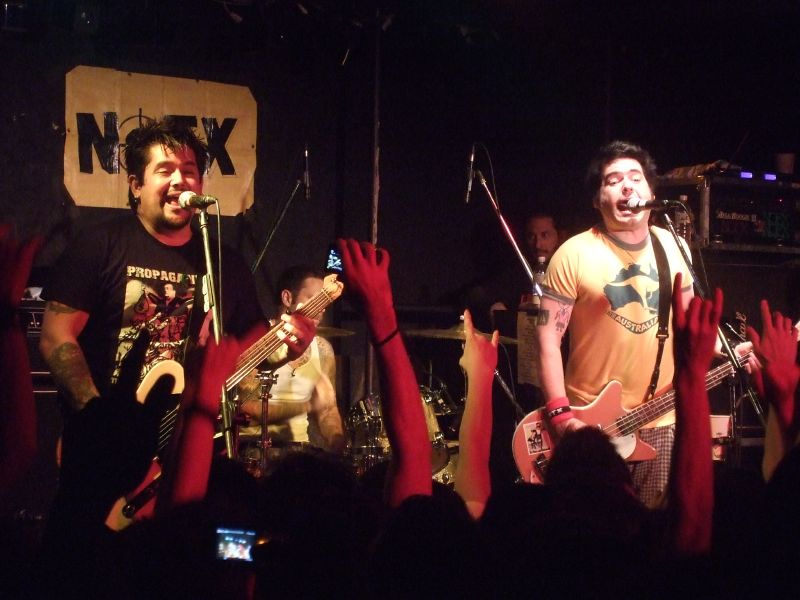
NOFX in 2007

Late 1970s punk music was anti-conformity and anti-mainstream and achieved limited commercial success. By the 1990s, punk rock was sufficiently ingrained in Western culture that punk trappings were often used to market highly commercial bands as "rebels". Marketers capitalized on the style and hipness of punk rock to such an extent that a 1993 ad campaign for an automobile, the Subaru Impreza, claimed that the car was "like punk rock".

In 1993, California's Green Day and Bad Religion were both signed to major labels. The next year, Green Day put out Dookie, which sold nine million albums in the United States in just over two years. Bad Religion's Stranger Than Fiction was certified gold. Other California punk bands on the independent label Epitaph, run by Bad Religion guitarist Brett Gurewitz, also began achieving mainstream popularity. In 1994, Epitaph released Let's Go by Rancid, Punk in Drublic by NOFX, and Smash by the Offspring, each eventually certified gold or better. That June, Green Day's "Longview" reached number one on Billboard's Modern Rock Tracks chart and became a top forty airplay hit, arguably the first ever American punk song to do so; just one month later, the Offspring's "Come Out and Play" followed suit. MTV and radio stations such as Los Angeles' KROQ-FM played a major role in these bands' crossover success, though NOFX refused to let MTV air its videos.

Following the lead of Boston's Mighty Mighty Bosstones and Anaheim's No Doubt, ska punk and ska-core became widely popular in the mid-late 1990s. ...And Out Come the Wolves, the 1995 album by Rancid became the first record in the ska revival to be certified gold; (Note: ... And Out Come the Wolves was certified gold in January 1996. Let's Go, Rancid's previous album, received gold certification in July 2000.) Sublime's self-titled 1996 album was certified platinum early in 1997. In Australia, two popular groups, skatecore band Frenzal Rhomb and pop-punk act Bodyjar, also established followings in Japan.

Green Day and Dookie's enormous sales paved the way for a host of bankable North American pop-punk bands in the following decade. With punk rock's renewed visibility came concerns among some in the punk community that the music was being co-opted by the mainstream. They argued that by signing to major labels and appearing on MTV, punk bands like Green Day were buying into a system that punk was created to challenge. Such controversies have been part of the punk culture since 1977 when the Clash were widely accused of "selling out" for signing with CBS Records. The Vans Warped Tour and the mall chain store Hot Topic brought punk even further into the U.S. mainstream.

The Offspring's 1998 album Americana, released by the major Columbia label, debuted at number two on the album chart. A bootleg MP3 of Americana's first single, "Pretty Fly (for a White Guy)", made it onto the Internet and was downloaded a record 22 million times—illegally. The following year, Enema of the State, the first fully major-label release by pop-punk band Blink-182, reached the top ten and sold four million copies in under twelve months. On February 19, 2000, the album's second single, "All the Small Things", peaked at number 6 on the Billboard Hot 100. While they were viewed as Green Day "acolytes", critics also found teen pop acts such as Britney Spears, the Backstreet Boys, and 'N Sync suitable points of comparison for Blink-182's sound and market niche. The band's Take Off Your Pants and Jacket (2001) and Untitled (2003) respectively rose to numbers one and three on the album chart. In November 2003, The New Yorker described how the "giddily puerile" act had "become massively popular with the mainstream audience, a demographic formerly considered untouchable by punk-rock purists."

Other new North American pop-punk bands, though often critically dismissed, also achieved major sales in the first decade of the 2000s. Ontario's Sum 41 reached the Canadian top ten with its 2001 debut album, All Killer No Filler, which eventually went platinum in the United States. The record included the number one U.S. Alternative hit "Fat Lip", which incorporated verses of what one critic called "brat rap". Elsewhere around the world, "punkabilly" band the Living End became major stars in Australia with their self-titled 1998 debut.

Additionally in the early 2000s, attention within punk circles was drawn to the Afro-punk movement and contributions of people of African descent to punk music. Much of this attention was derived from the eponymous documentary released in 2003.

The effect of commercialization on the music became an increasingly contentious issue. As observed by scholar Ross Haenfler, many punk fans "despise corporate punk rock", typified by bands Sum 41 and Blink-182.

== Other influential subgenres ==
=== Oi! ===
"Punks Not Dead"
The title track of the Exploited's debut, Punks Not Dead, the top independent UK album of 1981. The song exemplifies the Oi! sound as "harsher, darker, and cruder" than first-wave punk.

Following the lead of first-wave British punk bands Cock Sparrer and Sham 69, in the late 1970s second-wave groups like Cockney Rejects, Angelic Upstarts, the Exploited, and the 4-Skins sought to realign punk rock with a working class, street-level following. They believed the music needed to stay "accessible and unpretentious", in the words of music historian Simon Reynolds. Their style was originally called "real punk" or street punk; Sounds journalist Garry Bushell is credited with labelling the genre Oi! in 1980. The name is partly derived from the Cockney Rejects' habit of shouting "Oi! Oi! Oi!" before each song, instead of the time-honored "1, 2, 3, 4!"

The Oi! movement was fueled by a sense that many participants in the early punk rock scene were, in the words of the Business guitarist Steve Kent, "trendy university people using long words, trying to be artistic ... and losing touch". According to Bushell, "Punk was meant to be of the voice of the dole queue, and in reality, most of them were not. But Oi was the reality of the punk mythology. In the places where [these bands] came from, it was harder and more aggressive and it produced just as much quality music." Lester Bangs described Oi! as "politicized football chants for unemployed louts". One song in particular, the Exploited's "Punks Not Dead", spoke to an international constituency. It was adopted as an anthem by the groups of disaffected Mexican urban youth known in the 1980s as bandas; one banda named itself PND, after the song's initials.

Although most Oi! bands in the initial wave were apolitical or left wing, many of them began to attract a white power skinhead following. Racist skinheads sometimes disrupted Oi! concerts by shouting fascist slogans and starting fights, but some Oi! bands were reluctant to endorse criticism of their fans from what they perceived as the "middle-class establishment". In the popular imagination, the movement thus became linked to the far right. Strength Thru Oi!, an album compiled by Bushell and released in May 1981, stirred controversy, especially when it was revealed that the belligerent figure on the cover was a neo-Nazi jailed for racist violence (Bushell claimed ignorance). On July 3, a concert at Hamborough Tavern in Southall featuring the Business, the 4-Skins, and the Last Resort was firebombed by local Asian youths who believed that the event was a neo-Nazi gathering. Following the Southall riot, press coverage increasingly associated Oi! with the extreme right, and the movement soon began to lose momentum.

=== Anarcho-punk ===
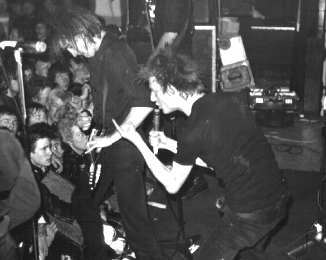
Crass were the originators of anarcho-punk. Spurning the "cult of rock star personality", their plain, all-black dress became a staple of the genre.

Anarcho-punk developed alongside the Oi! and American hardcore movements. Inspired by Crass, its Dial House commune, and its independent Crass Records label, a scene developed around British bands such as Subhumans, Flux of Pink Indians, Conflict, Poison Girls, and the Apostles that was as concerned with anarchist and DIY principles as it was with music. Several Crass members were of an older generation of artist and cultural provocateur and thus linked their version of punk directly back to the 1960s counterculture and early 1970s avant-gardism. The acts featured ranting vocals, discordant instrumental sounds, seemingly primitive production values, and lyrics filled with political and social content, often addressing issues such as class inequalities and military violence. Anarcho-punk disdained the older punk scene from which theirs had evolved. In historian Tim Gosling's description, they saw "safety pins and Mohicans as little more than ineffectual fashion posturing stimulated by the mainstream media and industry. [...] Whereas the Sex Pistols would proudly display bad manners and opportunism in their dealings with 'the establishment,' the anarcho-punks kept clear of 'the establishment' altogether".

The movement spun off several subgenres of a similar political bent. Discharge, founded back in 1977, established D-beat in the early 1980s. Other groups in the movement, led by Amebix and Antisect, developed the extreme style known as crust punk. Several of these bands rooted in anarcho-punk such as the Varukers, Discharge, and Amebix, along with former Oi! groups such as the Exploited and bands from farther afield like Birmingham's Charged GBH, became the leading figures in the UK 82 hardcore movement. The anarcho-punk scene also spawned bands such as Napalm Death, Carcass, and Extreme Noise Terror that in the mid-1980s defined grindcore, incorporating extremely fast tempos and death metal–style guitarwork. Led by Dead Kennedys, a U.S. anarcho-punk scene developed around such bands as Austin's MDC and Southern California's Another Destructive System.

=== Pop-punk ===
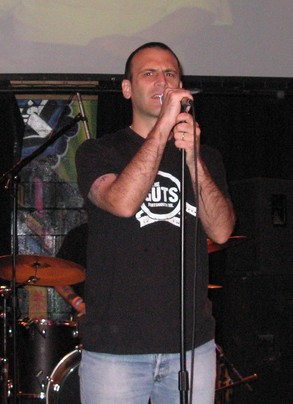
Ben Weasel of pop-punk band Screeching Weasel

With their love of the Beach Boys and late 1960s bubblegum pop, the Ramones paved the way to what became known as pop-punk. In the late 1970s, UK bands such as Buzzcocks and the Undertones combined pop-style tunes and lyrical themes with punk's speed and chaotic edge. In the early 1980s, some of the leading bands in Southern California's hardcore punk rock scene emphasized a more melodic approach than was typical of their peers. According to music journalist Ben Myers, Bad Religion "layered their pissed off, politicized sound with the smoothest of harmonies"; Descendents "wrote almost surfy, Beach Boys-inspired songs about girls and food and being young(ish)". Northern and Southern Californian labels Lookout Records, founded by Larry Livermore and Epitaph Records, founded by Brett Gurewitz of Bad Religion, was the base for many future pop-punk bands. The mainstream pop-punk of latter-day bands such as Blink-182 or Green Day are criticized by many punk rock fans; in critic Christine Di Bella's words, "It's punk taken to its most accessible point, a point where it barely reflects its lineage at all, except in the three-chord song structures."

=== Fusions and directions ===
From 1977 on, punk rock crossed lines with many other popular music genres. Los Angeles punk rock bands laid the groundwork for a wide variety of styles: the Flesh Eaters with deathrock; the Plugz with Chicano punk; and Gun Club with punk blues. The Meteors, from South London, and the Cramps were innovators in the psychobilly fusion style. Milwaukee's Violent Femmes jumpstarted the American folk punk scene, while the Pogues did the same on the other side of the Atlantic. Other artists to fuse elements of folk music into punk included R.E.M. and the Proclaimers.

== See also ==
- Punk ideologies
- Women in punk rock

== Suggested viewing ==
- 1991: The Year Punk Broke (1992, dir. Dave Markey)
- American Hardcore (2006, dir. Paul Rachman) – American hardcore punk scene
- Another State of Mind (1984, dir. Adam Small, Peter Stuart) – Social Distortion and Youth Brigade on tour, also Minor Threat
- Arena: Punk and the Pistols (1995, dir. Paul Tickell) - Documentary featuring 'in depth' interviews from all the key players at the core of the original English scene, by the BBC
- The Clash: Westway to the World (2000, dir. Don Letts) – Story of the Clash
- The Damned: Don't You Wish That We Were Dead (2015, dir. Wes Orshoski) – Story of The Damned
- The Decline of Western Civilization (1981, dir. Penelope Spheeris) – Early Los Angeles punk scene
- D.O.A.: A Rite of Passage (2014, dir. Craig DeLuz, Michael Allen) – Origins of punk rock
- The Filth and the Fury (2000, dir. Julien Temple) – Story of the Sex Pistols from the band's perspective
- Pistol (2022, dir. Danny Boyle) – scripted miniseries based on the memoir Lonely Boy by Steve Jones.
- Punk Rock Britannia Part 1 Pre-Punk: 1972–1976 (2012, dir. Andy Dunn) -Documentary from a TV series produced by the BBC
- Punk Rock Britannia Part 2 Punk: 1976–1978 (2012, dir. Sam Bridger) – Documentary from a TV series produced by the BBC
- The Punk Rock Movie (1978, dir. Don Letts) – The early punk scene in London
- The Punk Singer (2013, dir. Sini Anderson) – Kathleen Hanna of Bikini Kill and riot grrrl
- Salad Days: A Decade of Punk in Washington, DC (2014, dir. Scott Crawford) – DC punk bands and Dischord Records
- X: The Unheard Music (1986, dir. W. T. Morgan) – Los Angeles band X

== Sources ==
- Andersen, Mark, and Mark Jenkins (2001). Dance of Days: Two Decades of Punk in the Nation's Capital (New York: Soft Skull Press). ISBN 1-887128-49-2
- Anderson, Mark (2002). "Zunō keisatsu", in Encyclopedia of Contemporary Japanese Culture, ed. Sandra Buckley (London and New York: Routledge), p. 588. ISBN 0-415-14344-6
- Azerrad, Michael (2001). Our Band Could Be Your Life (New York: Little, Brown). ISBN 0-316-78753-1
- Bangs, Lester (1980). "Protopunk: The Garage Bands". The Rolling Stone Illustrated History of Rock & Roll (second ed.). New York City: Random House. ISBN 9780394739380.
- Bangs, Lester (2003). Psychotic Reactions and Carburetor Dung. Anchor Books, a division of Random House.
- Bennett, Andy (2001). "'Plug in and Play!': UK Indie Guitar Culture", in Guitar Cultures, eds. Andy Bennett and Kevin Dawe (Oxford and New York: Berg), pp. 45–62. ISBN 1-85973-434-0
- Berthier, Héctor Castillo (2001). "My Generation: Rock and la Banda's Forced Survival Opposite the Mexican State", in Rockin' las Américas: The Global Politics of Rock in Latin/o America, ed. Deborah Pacini Hernandez (Pittsburgh: University of Pittsburgh Press), pp. 241–60. ISBN 0-8229-4226-7
- Bessman, Jim (1993). Ramones: An American Band (New York: St. Martin's Press). ISBN 0-312-09369-1
- Bockris, Victor, and Roberta Bayley (1999). Patti Smith: An Unauthorized Biography (New York: Simon & Schuster). ISBN 0-684-82363-2
- Bolton, Andrew; Hell, Richard; Lydon, John; Savage, Jon (May 15, 2013). Bell, Eugenia (ed.). Punk: Chaos to Couture. Metropolitan Museum of Art. ISBN 978-0-300-19185-1. OCLC 813393428.
- Boot, Adrian, and Chris Salewicz (1997). Punk: The Illustrated History of a Music Revolution (New York: Penguin). ISBN 0-14-026098-6
- Buckley, Peter, ed. (2003). The Rough Guide to Rock (London: Rough Guides). ISBN 1-84353-105-4
- Burchill, Julie; Parsons, Tony (1978). The Boy Looked at Johnny: The Obituary of Rock and Roll. London: Pluto Press. ISBN 0-86104-030-9.
- Burns, Rob, and Wilfried Van Der Will (1995). "The Federal Republic 1968 to 1990: From the Industrial Society to the Culture Society", in German Cultural Studies: An Introduction, ed. Burns (Oxford and New York: Oxford University Press), pp. 257–324. ISBN 0-19-871503-X
- Campbell, Michael, with James Brody (2008). Rock and Roll: An Introduction, 2nd ed. (Belmont, Calif.: Thomson Schirmer). ISBN 0-534-64295-0
- Carson, Tom (1979). "Rocket to Russia", in Stranded: Rock and Roll for a Desert Island, ed. Greil Marcus (New York: Knopf). ISBN 0-394-73827-6
- Catucci, Nick (2004a). "Blink-182", in The New Rolling Stone Album Guide, 4th ed., ed. Nathan Brackett (New York: Fireside Books), p. 85. ISBN 0-7432-0169-8
- Catucci, Nick (2004b). "Green Day", in The New Rolling Stone Album Guide, 4th ed., ed. Nathan Brackett (New York: Fireside Books), pp. 347–48. ISBN 0-7432-0169-8
- Colegrave, Stephen, and Chris Sullivan (2005). Punk: The Definitive Record of a Revolution (New York: Thunder's Mouth). ISBN 1-56025-769-5
- Coon, Caroline (1977). "1988": the New Wave [and] Punk Rock Explosion. (London: Orbach and Chambers). ISBN 0-8015-6129-9.
- Creswell, Toby (2006). 1001 Songs: The Great Songs of All Time and the Artists, Stories and Secrets Behind Them (New York: Thunder's Mouth). ISBN 1-56025-915-9
- Dickson, Paul (1982). Words: A Connoisseur's Collection of Old and New, Weird and Wonderful, Useful and Outlandish Words (New York: Delacorte). ISBN 0-440-09606-5
- Diehl, Matt (2007). My So-Called Punk: Green Day, Fall Out Boy, the Distillers, Bad Religion—How Neo-Punk Stage-Dived into the Mainstream (New York: St. Martin's Press). ISBN 0-312-33781-7
- Dougan, John (2002). "X-Ray Spex", in All Music Guide to Rock: The Definitive Guide to Rock, Pop, and Soul, 3rd ed., eds. Vladimir Bogdanov, Chris Woodstra, and Stephen Thomas Erlewine (San Francisco: Backbeat Books). ISBN 0-87930-653-X
- Ellis, Iain (2008). Rebels Wit Attitude: Subversive Rock Humorists (Berkeley, Calif: Soft Skull Press). ISBN 1-59376-206-2.
- Erlewine, Stephen Thomas (2002). "The Birthday Party", in All Music Guide to Rock: The Definitive Guide to Rock, Pop, and Soul, 3rd ed., eds. Vladimir Bogdanov, Chris Woodstra, and Stephen Thomas Erlewine (San Francisco: Backbeat Books). ISBN 0-87930-653-X
- Fletcher, Tony (2000). Moon: The Life and Death of a Rock Legend (New York: HarperCollins). ISBN 0-380-78827-6
- Frere-Jones, Sasha (2004). "Bad Brains", in The New Rolling Stone Album Guide, 4th ed., ed. Nathan Brackett (New York: Fireside Books), pp. 34–35. ISBN 0-7432-0169-8
- Friedlander, Paul, with Peter Miller (2006). Rock and Roll: A Social History, 2nd ed. (Boulder, Co.: Westview). ISBN 0-8133-4306-2
- Friskics-Warren, Bill (2005). I'll Take You There: Pop Music And the Urge for Transcendence (New York and London: Continuum International). ISBN 0-8264-1700-0
- Gaar, Gillian G. (2002). She's a Rebel: The History of Women in Rock & Roll, 2nd ed. (New York: Seal). ISBN 1-58005-078-6
- Gendron, Bernard (2002). Between Montmartre and the Mudd Club: Popular Music and the Avant-Garde (Chicago and London: University of Chicago Press). ISBN 0-226-28735-1
- Gimarc, George (1997). Post Punk Diary, 1980–1982. New York: St. Martin's Press. ISBN 978-0-312-16968-8
- Gimarc, George (2005). Punk Diary: The Ultimate Trainspotter's Guide to Underground Rock, 1970–1982. San Francisco: Backbeat Books. ISBN 978-0-8793-0848-3
- Glasper, Ian (2004). Burning Britain—The History of UK Punk 1980–1984 (London: Cherry Red Books). ISBN 1-901447-24-3
- Goodlad, Lauren M. E., and Michael Bibby (2007). "Introduction", in Goth: Undead Subculture, ed. Goodlad and Bibby (Durham, N.C.: Duke University Press). ISBN 0-8223-3921-8
- Gosling, Tim (2004). "'Not for Sale': The Underground Network of Anarcho-Punk", in Music Scenes: Local, Translocal and Virtual, eds. Andy Bennett and Richard A. Peterson (Nashville, Tenn.: Vanderbilt University Press), pp. 168–83. ISBN 0-8265-1450-2
- Gray, Marcus (2005 [1995]). The Clash: Return of the Last Gang in Town, 5th rev. ed. (London: Helter Skelter). ISBN 1-905139-10-1
- Greenwald, Andy (2003). Nothing Feels Good: Punk Rock, Teenagers, and Emo (New York: St. Martin's Press). ISBN 0-312-30863-9
- Gross, Joe (2004). "Rancid", in The New Rolling Stone Album Guide, 4th ed., ed. Nathan Brackett (New York: Fireside Books), p. 677. ISBN 0-7432-0169-8
- Haenfler, Ross (2006). Straight Edge: Hardcore Punk, Clean-Living Youth, and Social Change (New Brunswick, N.J.: Rutgers University Press). ISBN 0-8135-3852-1
- Hannon, Sharon M. (2009). Punks: A Guide to an American Subculture (Santa Barbara, California: Greenwood Press). ISBN 978-0-313-36456-3
- Hardman, Emilie (2007). "Before You Can Get Off Your Knees: Profane Existence and Anarcho-Punk as a Social Movement". Paper presented at the annual meeting of the American Sociological Association, New York City, August 11, 2007 (available online).
- Harrington, Joe S. (2002). Sonic Cool: The Life & Death of Rock 'n' Roll (Milwaukee: Hal Leonard). ISBN 0-634-02861-8
- Harris, John (2004). Britpop!: Cool Britannia and the Spectacular Demise of English Rock (Cambridge, Massachusetts: Da Capo) ISBN 0-306-81367-X
- Hebdige, Dick (1987). Cut 'n' Mix: Culture, Identity and Caribbean Music (London: Routledge). ISBN 0-415-05875-9
- Hess, Mickey (2007). Is Hip Hop Dead?: The Past, Present, and Future of America's Most Wanted Music (Westport, Conn.: Praeger). ISBN 0-275-99461-9
- Heylin, Clinton (1993). From the Velvets to the Voidoids: The Birth of American Punk Rock (Chicago: A Cappella Books). ISBN 1-55652-575-3
- Heylin, Clinton (2007). Babylon's Burning: From Punk to Grunge (New York: Canongate). ISBN 1-84195-879-4
- Home, Stewart (1996). Cranked Up Really High: Genre Theory and Punk Rock (Hove, UK: Codex). ISBN 1-899598-01-4
- Jackson, Buzzy (2005). A Bad Woman Feeling Good: Blues and the Women Who Sing Them (New York: W. W. Norton). ISBN 0-393-05936-7
- James, Martin (2003). French Connections: From Discothèque to Discovery (London: Sanctuary). ISBN 1-86074-449-4
- Keithley, Joe (2004). I, Shithead: A Life in Punk (Vancouver: Arsenal Pulp Press). ISBN 1-55152-148-2
- Klein, Naomi (2000). No LOGO: Taking Aim at the Brand Bullies (New York: Picador). ISBN 0-312-20343-8
- Knowles, Chris (2003). Clash City Showdown (Otsego, Mich.: PageFree). ISBN 1-58961-138-1
- Laing, Dave (1985). One Chord Wonders: Power and Meaning in Punk Rock. Milton Keynes and Philadelphia: Open University Press. ISBN 978-0-335-15065-6.
- Lamey, Charles P., and Ira Robbins (1991). "Exploited", in The Trouser Press Record Guide, 4th ed., ed. Ira Robbins (New York: Collier), pp. 230–31. ISBN 0-02-036361-3
- Leblanc, Lauraine (1999). Pretty in Punk: Girls' Gender Resistance in a Boys' Subculture (New Brunswick, N.J.: Rutgers University Press). ISBN 0-8135-2651-5
- Lydon, John (1995). Rotten: No Irish, No Blacks, No Dogs (New York: Picador). ISBN 0-312-11883-X
- Mahon, Maureen (2008). "African Americans and Rock 'n' Roll", in African Americans and Popular Culture, Volume 3: Music and Popular Art, ed. Todd Boyd (Westport, Conn.: Praeger), pp. 31–60. ISBN 978-0-275-98925-5
- Marcus, Greil, ed. (1979). Stranded: Rock and Roll for a Desert Island (New York: Knopf). ISBN 0-394-73827-6
- Marcus, Greil (1989). Lipstick Traces: A Secret History of the Twentieth Century (Cambridge, Massachusetts: Harvard University Press). ISBN 0-674-53581-2
- Marks, Ian D.; McIntyre, Iain (2010). Wild About You: The Sixties Beat Explosion in Australia and New Zealand (1st ed.). Verse Chorus Press. ISBN 978-1-891241-28-4. Archived from the original on May 7, 2021.
- McCaleb, Ian (1991). "Radio Birdman", in The Trouser Press Record Guide, 4th ed., ed. Ira Robbins (New York: Collier), pp. 529–30. ISBN 0-02-036361-3
- McFarlane, Ian (1999). The Encyclopedia of Australian Rock and Pop (St Leonards, Aus.: Allen & Unwin). ISBN 1-86508-072-1
- McGowan, Chris, and Ricardo Pessanha (1998). The Brazilian Sound: Samba, Bossa Nova, and the Popular Music of Brazil (Philadelphia: Temple University Press). ISBN 1-56639-545-3
- McKay, George (1996). Senseless Acts of Beauty: Cultures of Resistance since the Sixties. London: Verso, chapter 3: 'CRASS 621984 ANOK4U2', 73–101. ISBN 1-85984-028-0
- McKay, George (2023). 'Was punk DIY? Is DIY punk? Interrogating the DIY/punk nexus, with particular reference to the early UK punk scene, c. 1976–1984.' Archived December 7, 2023, at the Wayback Machine DIY, Alternative Cultures and Society journal.
- McNeil, Legs; McCain, Gillian (1996). Please Kill Me: The Uncensored Oral History of Punk. New York: Little, Brown and Company. ISBN 978-0316881470.
- Lemlich, Jeffrey M. (1992). Savage Lost: Florida Garage Bands: The '60s and Beyond (1st ed.). Miami, Florida: Distinctive Punishing Corp. ISBN 978-978-0-942960.
- Miles, Barry, Grant Scott, and Johnny Morgan (2005). The Greatest Album Covers of All Time (London: Collins & Brown). ISBN 1-84340-301-3
- Myers, Ben (2006). Green Day: American Idiots & the New Punk Explosion (New York: Disinformation). ISBN 1-932857-32-X
- Mullen, Brendan, with Don Bolles and Adam Parfrey (2002). Lexicon Devil: The Fast Times and Short Life of Darby Crash and the Germs (Los Angeles: Feral House). ISBN 0-922915-70-9
- Nichols, David (2003). The Go-Betweens (Portland, Ore.: Verse Chorus Press). ISBN 1-891241-16-8
- Nobahkt, David (2004). Suicide: No Compromise (London: SAF). ISBN 0-946719-71-3
- O'Hara, Craig (1999). The Philosophy of Punk: More Than Noise (San Francisco and Edinburgh: AK Press). ISBN 1-873176-16-3
- Palmer, Robert (1992). "The Church of the Sonic Guitar", in Present Tense: Rock & Roll and Culture, ed. Anthony DeCurtis (Durham, N.C.: Duke University Press), pp. 13–38. ISBN 0-8223-1265-4
- Pardo, Alona (2004). "Jamie Reid", in Communicate: Independent British Graphic Design Since the Sixties, ed. Rick Poyner (New Haven, Conn.: Yale University Press), p. 245. ISBN 0-300-10684-X
- Pareles, Jon, and Patricia Romanowski (eds.) (1983). The Rolling Stone Encyclopedia of Rock & Roll (New York: Rolling Stone Press/Summit Books). ISBN 0-671-44071-3
- Porter, Dick (2007). The Cramps: A Short History of Rock 'n' Roll Psychosis (London: Plexus). ISBN 0-85965-398-6
- Purcell, Natalie J. (2003). Death Metal Music: The Passion and Politics of a Subculture (Jefferson, N.C., and London: McFarland). ISBN 0-7864-1585-1
- Raha, Maria (2005). Cinderella's Big Score: Women of the Punk and Indie Underground (Emeryville, Calif.: Seal). ISBN 1-58005-116-2
- Reed, John (2005). Paul Weller: My Ever Changing Moods. London: Omnibus Press. ISBN 978-1-84449-491-0.
- Reynolds, Simon (2005). Rip It Up and Start Again: Post Punk 1978–1984. London and New York: Faber and Faber. ISBN 978-0-571-21569-0.
- Robb, John (2006). Punk Rock: An Oral History (London: Elbury Press). ISBN 0-09-190511-7
- Robinson, Lisa (2014). There Goes Gravity: A Life in Rock and Roll. New York: Riverhead Books. ISBN 978-1594487149.
- Rodel, Angela (2004). "Extreme Noise Terror: Punk Rock and the Aesthetics of Badness", in Bad Music: The Music We Love to Hate, eds. Christopher Washburne and Maiken Derno (New York: Routledge), pp. 235–56. ISBN 0-415-94365-5
- Rooksby, Rikky (2001). Inside Classic Rock Tracks (San Francisco: Backbeat). ISBN 0-87930-654-8
- Sabin, Roger (1999). Punk Rock: So What?: the Cultural Legacy of Punk. London: Routledge. ISBN 978-0-415-17030-7.
- Savage, Jon (1991). England's Dreaming: The Sex Pistols and Punk Rock. London: Faber and Faber. ISBN 978-0-312-28822-8.
- Savage, Jon (1992). England's Dreaming: Anarchy, Sex Pistols, Punk Rock, and Beyond. New York: St. Martin's Press. ISBN 978-0-312-08774-6.
- Shapiro, Fred R. (2006). Yale Book of Quotations (New Haven, Conn.: Yale University Press). ISBN 0-300-10798-6
- Schmidt, Axel, and Klaus Neumann-Braun (2004). Die Welt der Gothics: Spielräume düster konnotierter Tranzendenz (Wiesbaden: VS Verlag). ISBN 3-531-14353-0
- Shuker, Roy (2002). Popular Music: The Key Concepts. London: Routledge. ISBN 0-415-28425-2
- Simpson, Paul (2003). The Rough Guide to Cult Pop: The Songs, the Artists, the Genres, the Dubious Fashions. London: Rough Guides. ISBN 978-1-84353-229-3
- Sinagra, Laura (2004). "Sum 41", in The New Rolling Stone Album Guide, 4th ed., ed. Nathan Brackett (New York: Fireside Books), pp. 791–92. ISBN 0-7432-0169-8
- Smith, Kerry L. (2008). Encyclopedia of Indie Rock (Westport, Conn.: Greenwood). ISBN 978-0-313-34119-9
- Spencer, Amy (2005). DIY: The Rise of Lo-Fi Culture (London: Marion Boyars). ISBN 0-7145-3105-7
- Spitz, Marc (2006). Nobody Likes You: Inside the Turbulent Life, Times, and Music of Green Day (New York: Hyperion). ISBN 1-4013-0274-2
- Spitz, Marc, and Brendan Mullen (2001). We Got the Neutron Bomb: The Untold Story of L.A. Punk (New York: Three Rivers Press). ISBN 0-609-80774-9
- Stafford, Andrew (2006). Pig City: From the Saints to Savage Garden, 2nd rev. ed. (Brisbane: University of Queensland Press). ISBN 0-7022-3561-X
- Stark, James (2006). Punk '77: An Inside Look at the San Francisco Rock N' Roll Scene, 3rd ed. (San Francisco: RE/Search Publications). ISBN 1-889307-14-9
- Strohm, John (2004). "Women Guitarists: Gender Issues in Alternative Rock", in The Electric Guitar: A History of an American Icon, ed. A. J. Millard (Baltimore: Johns Hopkins University Press), pp. 181–200. ISBN 0-8018-7862-4
- Strongman, Phil (2008). Pretty Vacant: A History of UK Punk (Chicago: Chicago Review Press). ISBN 1-55652-752-7
- St. Thomas, Kurt, with Troy Smith (2002). Nirvana: The Chosen Rejects (New York: St. Martin's Press). ISBN 0-312-20663-1
- Taylor, Steven (2003). False Prophet: Field Notes from the Punk Underground. Middletown, Conn.: Wesleyan University Press. ISBN 978-0-8195-6668-3.
- Taylor, Steve (2004). The A to X of Alternative Music. London and New York: Continuum. ISBN 978-0-8264-8217-4.
- True, Everett (2002). Hey Ho Let's Go: The Story of the Ramones. Omnibus Press. ISBN 978-1-8444-9413-2.
- Unterberger, Richie (2002). "British Punk", in All Music Guide to Rock: The Definitive Guide to Rock, Pop, and Soul, 3rd ed., eds. Vladimir Bogdanov, Chris Woodstra, and Stephen Thomas Erlewine (San Francisco: Backbeat). ISBN 0-87930-653-X
- Walker, Clinton (1982/2004) Inner City Sound (Portland, Oregon: Verse Chorus Press) ISBN 1-891241-18-4
- Walker, Clinton (1996) Stranded (Sydney: Macmillan) ISBN 0 7329 0883 3
- Walker, John (1991). "Television", in The Trouser Press Record Guide, 4th ed., ed. Ira Robbins (New York: Collier), p. 662. ISBN 0-02-036361-3
- Walsh, Gavin (2006). Punk on 45; Revolutions on Vinyl, 1976–79 (London: Plexus). ISBN 0-85965-370-6
- Weinstein, Deena (2000). Heavy Metal: The Music and Its Culture (New York: Da Capo). ISBN 0-306-80970-2
- Wells, Steven (2004). Punk: Loud, Young & Snotty: The Story Behind the Songs (New York and London: Thunder's Mouth). ISBN 1-56025-573-0
- Wilkerson, Mark Ian (2006). Amazing Journey: The Life of Pete Townshend (Louisville: Bad News Press). ISBN 1-4116-7700-5
- Wojcik, Daniel (1995). Punk and Neo-Tribal Body Art (Jackson: University Press of Mississippi). ISBN 0-87805-735-8
- Wojcik, Daniel (1997). The End of the World as We Know It: Faith, Fatalism, and Apocalypse in America (New York: New York University Press). ISBN 0-8147-9283-9
- Wolf, Mary Montgomery (May 2008). "We Accept You, One of Us?": Punk Rock, Community, and Individualism in an Uncertain Era, 1974–1985 (Thesis). Department of History, College of Arts and Sciences, University of North Carolina at Chapel Hill. doi:10.17615/e26e-6m88. Archived from the original on April 24, 2022. "A dissertation submitted to the faculty of the University of North Carolina at Chapel Hill in partial fulfillment of the requirements for the degree of Doctor of Philosophy in the Department of History."
- Worley, Matthew (2017). No Future: Punk, Politics and British Youth Culture, 1976–1984. Cambridge: Cambridge University Press.
