= Punk rock in Spain =

In Spain, the punk rock scene emerged in 1978, when the country had transitioned from the Francoist State to democracy, After Francisco Franco's death in 1975, the country went through a “volatile political period”, in which the country had to try to relearn democratic values and install a constitution. When punk emerged, it “did not appropriate socialism as its goal”; instead, it embraced “nihilism”, and focused on keeping the memories of past abuses alive, and accusing all of Spanish society of collaborating with the "fascist regime".

The early punk scene included a range of marginalized and outcast people, including workers, unemployed, leftists, anarchists, queers, dykes, poseurs, scroungers, and petty criminals. The scenes varied by city. In Madrid, which had been the power center of the Falangist party, the punk scene was like “a release valve” for the formerly repressed youth. In Barcelona, a city which had a particularly “marginalized status under Franco”, because he suppressed the area’s “Catalan language and culture”, the youth felt an “exclusion from mainstream society” that enabled them to come together and form a punk subculture.

The first independently released Spanish punk disc was a 45 RPM record by Almen TNT in 1979. The song, which sounded like the US band The Stooges stated that no one believed in revolution anymore, and it criticized the emerging consumer culture in Spain, as people flocked to the new department stores. The early Spanish punk records, most of which emerged in the explosion of punk in 1978, often reached back to "old-fashioned 50s rock-n-roll to glam to early metal to Detroit’s hard protopunk", creating an aggressive mix of fuzz guitar, jagged sounds, and crude Spanish slang lyrics.

The first references to punk in Spain, is usually cited as Kaka de Luxe and La Banda Trapera del Rio. There was three big scenes in Spain of punk rock: in Madrid (some bands are considered inside of "la movida"), Basque country (also called Basque Radical Rock) and Barcelona (more oriented to hardcore punk) one of the most important punk bands in Spanish history was La Polla Records.

== Hardcore Punk ==
In Spain, among the best known hardcore groups are HHH, Subterranean Kids, TDeK, GRB, 24 Ideas and X-Milk among others, which are characterized by also having parts of fast punk, which demonstrate the link between punk and hardcore. . Other groups to highlight would be El Corazón del Sapo, Nevergood, Nuevenoventaicinco, groups from the Aragonese scene. However, other groups, less known to the general public, but no less important, such as MG-15 and Último Gobierno, which played d-beat, forerunners of this genre in the State, must be named; or the wave of Catalan hardcore groups from the 1980s, such as Anti / Dogmatikss, GRB, L'Odi Social, Subterranean Kids, HHH, Rouse and, already in the 1990s, Corn Flakes, Innocents, Tropel Nat, 24 Ideas, X-Milk, Sowplot. In the Basque Country there were also classic groups related to this genre such as BAP !! (Anti Polizialak Brigade), Eskoria-tza, Soziety Alkoholika or Noise of Rage, influenced by metal. Also noteworthy at the beginning of the most hardcore metal scene with groups like Prap's. Although it would be necessary to add bands that changed the scene a lot at different times, such as 24 Ideas, a Barcelona band that introduced New York Hardcore with a straight edge influence in the State; Alarma Social, a group from Burgos, one of the first to go out, Shorebreak with the signing in Good Life, seemed to open up the state scene to Europe, something that has hardly been seen since; and it would also be necessary to highlight all the number and enormous number of bands from within punk, hardcore, crust, etc. They are the ones that have achieved the most the state scene is present outside this country, bands like Answer, Ictus, Machetazo, Looking For an Answer, ZInc, Ekkaia, Disface, Disflesh, Defeat Proud'z, Insomnia, Über, Horrör, Antiplayax, Black Panda, Alert! and a very long etc.
