= I Could Rule the World If I Could Only Get the Parts =

EP by the Waitresses
- Released: November 8, 1982
- Genres: New wave, post-punk
- Length: 20:01
- Label: Polydor
- Producers: Chris Butler, Mike Frondelli

The Waitresses chronology
Wasn't Tomorrow Wonderful? (1982)	I Could Rule the World If I Could Only Get the Parts (1982)	Bruiseology (1983)

Professional ratings
Review scores
Source	Rating
AllMusic	3/5 stars
Robert Christgau	A−

I Could Rule the World If I Could Only Get the Parts is an EP by the Waitresses. It includes the singles "Christmas Wrapping" (1981) and "Square Pegs" (1982); the latter was the theme song of the television series of the same name.

"I Could Rule the World If I Could Only Get the Parts" is a live cover (recorded from a Westwood One radio broadcast) of a song by Tin Huey, the prior band of Waitresses founder Chris Butler.

== Track listing ==
All songs written by Chris Butler and arranged by the Waitresses

1. "Christmas Wrapping" – 5:25
2. "Bread and Butter" – 4:11
3. "Square Pegs" – 3:06
4. "The Smartest Person I Know" – 3:33
5. "I Could Rule the World If I Could Only Get the Parts" – 3:46

== Personnel ==
- Patty Donahue – vocals
- Tracy Wormworth – bass
- Billy Ficca – drums
- Chris Butler – guitar
- Dan Klayman – organ
- Mars Williams – saxophone

with:

- Dave Buck – trumpet on "Christmas Wrapping"

== Charts ==
Chart	Peak	Date
U.S. Billboard 200	128	January 1983

== Trivia ==
- A backwards message was inserted in the middle of the track "The Smartest Person I Know." Singer Patty Donahue says: "Anyone who worries about subliminal messages on pop records is a fool. Everyone else have a nice day."
