= Wasn't Tomorrow Wonderful? =

Studio album by the Waitresses
- Released: January 11, 1982
- Recorded: 1980–1981
- Genres: New wave; post-punk
- Length: 41:43
- Label: Polydor
- Producers: Chris Butler; Kurt Munkacsi

The Waitresses chronology
The Waitresses In "Short Stack" (1978)	Wasn't Tomorrow Wonderful? (1982)	I Could Rule the World If I Could Only Get the Parts (1982)

Singles from Wasn't Tomorrow Wonderful?
- 1. "I Know What Boys Like" Released: 1982

Wasn't Tomorrow Wonderful? is the debut album of new wave band the Waitresses, released in 1982 by Polydor Records, licensed from ZE Records.

The album peaked at No. 41 on the Billboard 200 chart and included the earlier single "I Know What Boys Like".

== Reception ==
Professional ratings
Review scores
Source	Rating
AllMusic	4.5/5 stars
Pitchfork	8.2/10
Rolling Stone	3/5 stars
The Village Voice	B+

AllMusic critic Ben Tausig, writing retrospectively, said that the album "was a unique and fairly important moment in early-'80s new wave", and noted that "lead singer Patty Donahue's singing ranged from a playful sexiness on the well-known hit "I Know What Boys Like" to a half-talk, half-yell with shades of post-punk groups like Gang of Four and the Raincoats on 'Pussy Strut' and 'Go On.' The guitar and bass were bizarre and funk-influenced in much the same way as other well-known Akron, OH, groups like Devo and the Pretenders". Pitchfork's Madison Bloom called it "an arch yet sincere sendup of humdrum modern life" and each track "a miniature diorama of daily life, rendered in the highly saturated palette of pop art". Bloom commented that without several lines, its lyrics "might read like a dystopian critique of yuppie aspiration. But Butler knew that real life is a tad more complex—you do what you can to get by, and relish small moments of contentment".

== Track listing ==
All songs written by Chris Butler. This is the track list for the original US version.

1. "No Guilt" – 3:46
2. "Wise Up" – 3:20
3. "Quit" – 5:10
4. "It's My Car" – 3:20
5. "Wasn't Tomorrow Wonderful?" – 3:40
6. "I Know What Boys Like" – 3:11
7. "Heat Night" – 3:43
8. "Redland" – 2:55
9. "Pussy Strut" – 4:12
10. "Go On" – 2:49
11. "Jimmy Tomorrow" – 5:37

== Personnel ==
- Patty Donahue – vocals
- Ariel Warner – backing vocals
- Mars Williams – reeds
- David Hofstra – bass
- Billy Ficca – drums
- Dan Klayman – keyboards
- Chris Butler – guitar

with:

- Tracy Wormworth – bass
- Don Christensen – drums on "No Guilt"
- Ralph Carney – saxophone on "No Guilt" and "I Know What Boys Like"
- Stuart Austin – drums on "I Know What Boys Like"
- Rick Dailey – piano on "I Know What Boys Like"
- Andrew Fuhrmann – art direction

== Charts ==
Chart performance for Wasn't Tomorrow Wonderful?
Chart (1982)	Peak position
Australian Albums (Kent Music Report)	84
US Billboard 200	41
