= Hammer Damage =

American punk rock band

Hammer Damage was an American punk rock band from Akron, Ohio, that performed from 1978 until 1984.

== Career ==
Hammer Damage was founded in 1978, by Mike Hammer and Dave Zagar (a.k.a. Donny Damage) after their split from the Rubber City Rebels. The original line-up included George Cabaniss on guitar, Scott Winkler on bass, Damage on guitar and Hammer on drums. The Hammer Damage Band started out in 1978 and quickly built a strong following in the Akron-Kent music scene. They also enjoyed some modest success in Cleveland, Columbus, Kent and Youngstown.

Some of the band's highlights included opening for the B-52's and Public Image Ltd. at the Cleveland Agora, and several shows in New York with the Dead Boys. The band released a couple of singles and appeared on a compilation albums of Ohio bands. After some extended trips to New York and Los Angeles, and several line-up changes, the band finally fizzled out around 1984.

Hammer Damage contributed a song, "Noise Pollution" to the Bowling Balls From Hell II LP on Clone Records. Hammer Damage were one of the three bands profiled in the 2005 PBS documentary, If You're Not Dead, Play, along with Chi-Pig and Unit 5. Their song "Laugh" was featured in the Audience TV series Mr. Mercedes in 2017.

== 2010 reunion ==
Hammer, Zagar, Cabaniss, Winkler, and Kal Mullens teamed up to bring Hammer Damage back to life, and they performed in April 2000 at the Beachland Ballroom in Cleveland, and in May at the Tangier Akron.

== Members ==
=== Original lineup ===
- Dave Zagar ("Donny Damage") - Vocals and Guitar
- Michael Hammer - Drums
- Scott Winkler - Bass
- George Cabaniss - Guitar (left in 1979 to join the Dead Boys)

=== Later members ===
- Bad Bob Basone - Bass
- Ray Wolf - Bass
- Kevin Mullins - Guitar
- Dave Ihmels ("Dave Illinois" / "Hollywood Illinois") - Guitar (joined in 1979)
- Alison Berger - Guitar
- Ig Morningstar - Guitar
