= A Christmas Record =

Compilation album by Various artists
- Released: November 1981
- Recorded: 1981
- Studio: Detroit, Brooklyn, Manhattan
- Genre: Christmas
- Length: 39:22 (1981 issue); 36:58 (1982 issue); 50:38 (2004 CD issue)
- Label: ZE, Island

A Christmas Record is an LP originally released in 1981 by ZE Records. It was recorded by various musicians from that label's roster, including Was (Not Was), August Darnell, Material, Suicide, Cristina, and The Waitresses, all performing original seasonal songs. The album was reissued in 1982, as a "Special Edition", with a revised track listing. In 2004, a further revised version was issued on CD, as ZE Xmas Record Reloaded 2004. The 2004 version was remastered and re-released again in 2016 under its original title and artwork, with one of the 1982 "Special Edition" songs restored.

The record has been described as "the first-ever alternative Christmas album". ZE Records founder Michel Esteban has described it as an "improbable and delicious offering." It is widely, but unofficially, known as the "ZE Christmas Album". It featured the first release of The Waitresses' "Christmas Wrapping", a song later frequently included on numerous seasonal compilations, particularly in the UK, where it reached the singles chart in December 1982.

== Concept and recording ==
By 1981, ZE Records, a New York-based record label established by Michael Zilkha and Michel Esteban, had achieved some commercial success and a growing critical reputation. For the 2004 reissue of the album, Esteban gave the following background explanation in his liner notes:

"Christmas albums are a tradition as old as Rock & Roll itself but I have always thought that principles of Christmas: family, the tree, gifts, peace in the world, etc. were slightly contradictory to a certain vision of Rock & Roll. I found it hard to imagine John Cale and Lou Reed sitting around a Christmas tree exchanging gifts with Nico and tucking into a turkey dinner, the same goes for the members of The Stooges or MC5... Only the painter Guy Peellaert could have imagined such a scene. And yet my teenage heroes all took part in the Christmas song tradition: Phil Spector, Brian Wilson, Elvis. Berry Gordy got the whole Tamla Motown group at it, even James Brown, who wins the prize for the kitschiest sleeve, got in on the action. All of them made an album of Christmas songs, some better than others! In 1981 and 1982 ZE Records published its own Christmas album under the supervision of Michael Zilkha. All the American artists on ZE answered the call and came up with a Christmas track...."

Each of the bands on the label was asked to come up with a Christmas song. Chris Butler, founder and songwriter of The Waitresses, commented in a later interview:

"A Christmas album? On a hipster label? With a bunch of junkies on it? Eurotrash? Come on. Never happened.....OK, they were not all junkies and Eurotrash. But they were extreme individuals."

== Track listing ==
=== Original 1981 LP ===
The original album was initially released in the UK on white vinyl, and issued on ZE but with the distributor Island Records catalogue number ILPS 7017. Later copies used black vinyl.

The track by Material, with singer Nona Hendryx, was recorded at the same sessions that produced the band's single "Bustin' Out". The recording by Cristina – Zilkha's girlfriend and later wife – was her first to be produced by the duo Was (Not Was), who also contributed their own track to the album. The August Darnell track, "Christmas On Riverside Drive", was later credited to Darnell's group, Kid Creole and the Coconuts, and was included on expanded reissues of their album Tropical Gangsters.

The sleeve design was by Tony Wright, the art director of Island Records. The front cover showed stylised figures of some of the musicians, including Darnell, Hendryx, and Alan Vega, and a snowman, skating around a Christmas tree in the snow, and the back cover showed snow falling in a New York street scene at night.

Side One
No.	Title	Writer(s)	Performing Artist(s)	Length
1.	"It's A Holiday"	Bill Laswell, Fred Maher, Michael Beinhorn, Nona Hendryx, Ronald "Head" Drayton	Material with Nona Hendryx	7:12
2.	"Christmas On Riverside Drive"	Darnell	August Darnell	5:03
3.	"Christmas Fever"	Couture	Charlélie Couture	4:48
4.	"Hey Lord"	Alan Vega, Martin Rev	Suicide	3:25

Side Two
No.	Title	Writer(s)	Performing Artist(s)	Length
1.	"Things Fall Apart"	Cristina Monet, David Was, Don Was	Cristina	4:34
2.	"Christmas Wrapping"	Chris Butler	The Waitresses	5:21
3.	"Christmas Time in the Motor City"	David Was, Don Was	Was (Not Was)	2:55
4.	"No More Christmas Blues"	Vega, Rev	Alan Vega	3:13
5.	"It's A Big Country"	Sigerson	Davitt Sigerson	2:51

=== Revised 1982 "Special Edition" LP ===
For the revised 1982 version of the album, released as Island ILPS 7022, the tracks by Alan Vega and Charlélie Couture were replaced by tracks by The Three Courgettes – a British band featuring singer Barb Jungr, who recorded the song in London – and James White (also known as James Chance). The James White track has been described as a "droll, blasphemous, nearly tuneless piece of skronk". According to another source:

"The lyrics tell the story of a man with the Christmas blues who commits suicide and then meets up with Satan 'to join the celebration.' In the background, Chance incorporates bits and pieces of music from famous Christmas carols. One of the lyrics describes the party with Satan: 'There’s no angels or wise men, and certainly no virgins.'"

The running order of the album was completely revised, and a radically shortened and remixed version of the Material track was used. The sleeve design was maintained but with an additional red star stating "Special 1982 Edition". At the same time as the album was re-released in 1982, "Christmas Wrapping" by The Waitresses was issued as a single (Island WIP6821), and reached # 45 on the UK singles chart.

Side One
No.	Title	Performing Artist(s)	Length
1.	"Things Fall Apart"	Cristina	4:30
2.	"Hey Lord"	Suicide	3:24
3.	"Christmas Is Coming"	The Three Courgettes	3:30
4.	"Christmas With Satan"	James White	6:10

Side Two
No.	Title	Performing Artist(s)	Length
1.	"Christmas Wrapping"	The Waitresses	5:21
2.	"Christmas On Riverside Drive"	August Darnell	5:00
3.	"It's A Holiday"	Material with Nona Hendryx	3:18
4.	"Christmas Time In The Motor City"	Was (Not Was)	2:55
5.	"It's A Big Country"	Davitt Sigerson	2:50

=== Reissue on CD, 2004 ===
After ZE Records closed in 1984, most of the original recordings were unavailable for many years although some, including "Christmas Wrapping", appeared on other compilations. The CD version of the album, produced by Esteban and issued on the revived ZE label in 2004, features all the tracks on the original 1981 album, except that the Material track is the shorter version used on the 1982 album. It also contains the James White track contained on the 1982 album, but not the track by The Three Courgettes. In addition, the CD contains three further tracks, two of them, by Lisi and Miss OD (also known as Ophélie Doll) newly recorded by Esteban in France; and the remaining track, by Portuguese-born singer Lio with her sister, actress Helena Noguerra, and transsexual icon Marie France, recorded in 1988 for a French TV show. "Bells of Christmas", recorded by Miss OD, was a song originally recorded by The Beach Boys, and Esteban dedicated the album to Brian Wilson. The running order of the album was again completely different from that on either the 1981 or 1982 vinyl LPs, and a new sleeve design was used.

No.	Title	Performing Artist(s)	Length
1.	"My Silent Night"	Lisi	3:18
2.	"No More Christmas Blues"	Alan Vega	3:11
3.	"Things Fall Apart"	Cristina	4:32
4.	"Bells of Christmas"	Miss OD and the Gentlemen League	2:50
5.	"Christmas Wrapping"	The Waitresses	5:22
6.	"Sleigh Ride"	Lio, Helena Noguerra and Marie France	2:28
7.	"Christmas Fever"	Charlélie Couture	4:51
8.	"It's A Big Country"	Davitt Sigerson	2:52
9.	"Christmas On Riverside Drive"	August Darnell	5:06
10.	"It's A Holiday"	Material with Nona Hendryx	3:28
11.	"Christmas Time In The Motor City"	Was (Not Was)	2:59
12.	"Christmas With Satan"	James White	6:14
13.	"Hey Lord"	Suicide	3:27

=== Reissue on CD, 2016 ===
Michel Esteban remastered and re-released the album again on ZE on November 20, 2016, on CD in a replica LP sleeve with the original artwork and a label replicating the white vinyl LP, as well as MP3 and FLAC downloads with a digital booklet (the latter of which is also downloadable for free on the ZE web site). Unlike the 2004 Reloaded edition, this one includes the 3 Courgettes song at the end of the album. A couple of the song titles were also slightly altered.

No.	Title	Performing Artist(s)	Length
1.	"My Silent Night"	Lisi	3:16
2.	"No More Christmas Blues"	Alan Vega	3:09
3.	"Things Fall Apart"	Cristina	4:30
4.	"Bells of Christmas"	Miss OD and the Gentlemen League	2:48
5.	"Christmas Wrapping"	The Waitresses	5:20
6.	"Sleigh Ride"	Lio, Helena Noguerra and Marie France	2:30
7.	"Christmas Fever"	Charlélie Couture	4:49
8.	"It's a Big Country"	Davitt Sigerson	2:52
9.	"Christmas on Riverside Drive"	August Darnell	5:04
10.	"It's a Holiday"	Material with Nona Hendryx	3:26
11.	"Christmas Time in Motor City"	Was (Not Was)	2:57
12.	"Christmas with Satan"	James White	6:12
13.	"Hey Lord"	Suicide	3:27
14.	"Xmas is Coming"	The 3 Courgettes	3:24
