= Bruiseology =

Studio album by the Waitresses
- Released: May 1983
- Recorded: 1983
- Genre: Comedy rock
- Label: Polydor/PolyGram; 810 980
- Producer: Hugh Padgham, Chris Butler

The Waitresses chronology
I Could Rule the World If I Could Only Get the Parts (1982)	Bruiseology (1983)	The Best of The Waitresses (1990)

Bruiseology is the second and final studio album by the American band the Waitresses, released in 1983. The album was recorded amidst personnel conflict; the band disbanded a year later. Chris Butler intended for the album's lyrics and themes to be darker than the band's earlier work. The album was coproduced by Hugh Padgham.

== Critical reception ==
Professional ratings
Review scores
Source	Rating
AllMusic	2/5 stars
Robert Christgau	B+
The Rolling Stone Album Guide	2.5/5 stars

The Philadelphia Inquirer wrote that "the Waitresses is one of the very few bands that makes comedy records that also work as good music, solid rock 'n' roll." Robert Christgau noted that, "instead of cutting back on verbiage, Chris Butler solves his clutter problem by revving the music up so high it blares over its own complexity." Trouser Press deemed the album "another batch of witty and wise songs about the exigencies of modern womanhood," but opined that "the formula doesn’t wear all that well." The Washington Post determined that "Butler has a punkishly academic way with tunes, and most of these are endearing in a hook-laden, sassy vein."

== Track listing ==
All songs written by Chris Butler and Waitresses, except where noted.

1. "A Girl's Gotta Do"
2. "Make the Weather"
3. "Everything's Wrong If My Hair Is Wrong"
4. "Luxury"
5. "Open City"
6. "Thinking About Sex Again"
7. "Bruiseology"
8. "Pleasure" (Waitresses)
9. "Spin"
10. "They're All Out of Liquor, Let's Find Another Party"

== Personnel ==
- Patty Donahue – vocals
- Chris Butler – guitar
- Dan Klayman – organ
- Tracy Wormworth – bass, vocals, lead vocal on "Spin"
- Billy Ficca – drums
- Mars Williams – saxophone

with:

- Ed Caraeff – art direction, photography

== Charts ==
Chart	Peak	Date
U.S. Billboard 200	155	June 1983
