= The Best of The Waitresses =

The Best of The Waitresses may refer to:

- The Best of The Waitresses (1990 album)
- 20th Century Masters – The Millennium Collection: The Best of The Waitresses
