= If You're Not Dead, Play =

- Directed by: Phil Hoffman
- Written by: Phil Hoffman
- Production companies: Western Reserve Public Media; PBS
- Release date: 2005

If You're Not Dead, Play is a 2005 PBS rock music documentary, a Western Reserve Public Media/ PBS production and the sequel of It's Everything, And Then It's Gone.

This was also written and directed by Phil Hoffman. It provides the follow-up explanation of how the Akron Sound came to be with the second wave of Ohioan punk rock and new wave music bands who emerged in the 1980s, including Chi-Pig, Unit 5, and Hammer Damage.

== It's Everything, and Then It's Gone ==
It's Everything, and Then It's Gone
- Directed by: Phil Hoffman
- Written by: Phil Hoffman
- Produced by: Don Freeman
- Production companies: Western Reserve Public Media; PBS
- Release date: 2003

It's Everything, and Then It's Gone is a 2003 PBS rock music documentary. It is a Western Reserve Public Media/PBS production, executive produced by Don Freeman and written/directed by Phil Hoffman. It's Everything, and Then It's Gone takes viewers through the history of the first wave of mostly new wave music, post-punk, and art rock bands, all from Akron, Ohio, that arrived on the scene in the 1970s, and explains just how the Akron Sound developed. The first wave of these bands include: Devo, King Cobras (who would later reform as the Rubber City Rebels), The Bizarros, Tin Huey, Tin Huey's spin-off group The Waitresses, and The Numbers Band.
