= Mister T (TV series) =

- Genre: Action; Adventure
- Created by: Steve Gerber; Martin Pasko
- Developed by: Cliff Ruby; Elana Lesser; Martin Pasko (seasons 1-2); Kimmer Ringwald (season 2); Dan DiStefano (season 3)
- Directed by: Rudy Larriva (cartoon); Gary Shimikawa (live-action segments)
- Starring: Mr. T
- Voices of: Siu Ming Carson; Cathy Cavadini; Takayo Fischer; Teddy Field III; Phil LaMarr; Shawn Lieber; Amy Linker
- Composers: Haim Saban; Shuki Levy; Thomas Chase Jones; Steve Rucker; Udi Harpaz
- Country of origin: United States
- Original language: English
- No. of seasons: 3
- No. of episodes: 30

Production
- Executive producers: Joe Ruby; Ken Spears
- Cinematography: Joseph W. Calloway
- Running time: 30 minutes
- Production company: Ruby-Spears Enterprises

Original release
- Network: NBC
- Release: September 17, 1983 – October 19, 1985

Mister T is an American animated series that aired on NBC on Saturday morning from 1983 to 1985. It mainly featured the popular A-Team actor Mr. T. A total of 30 episodes were produced during all three seasons, with the thirteen episodes for Season 1, eleven for Season 2, and six episodes for the third and last season. The series was produced by Ruby-Spears Enterprises.

Reruns were later seen on the USA Cartoon Express in the late 1980s and early 1990s, as part of Cartoon Network's Adult Swim late-night programming block and spin-off network, Boomerang, which airs classic cartoons from Hanna-Barbera, Ruby-Spears (pre-1991 era), Turner, and classic Warner's animation libraries in the early 2000's and more recently on MeTV Toons.

The series was the first voice-acting role for both Cathy Cavadini and Phil LaMarr.

== Plot ==
The animated show stars Mr. T as a coach to a gymnastics team (with a specific emphasis on young-aged members: Jeff, Woody, Robin, and Kim), travelling across the world while becoming involved in and solving many different mysteries.

At the beginning of each episode, a live-action introduction featuring Mr. T himself is shown to explain what is going on. At the end of each episode, Mr. T narrates a moral lesson for all of the viewers.

== Characters ==
- Mr. T (voiced by himself) – He is the coach of the gymnastics team.
- Ms. Priscilla Bisby (voiced by Takayo Fischer) – The team's well-mannered bus driver, a middle-aged woman who loves mystery novels. Her catchphrase is "Oh my stars and garters". She has a stuntman nephew named Ronny "Showbiz" Bisby who aids Mr. T and the team in clearing Skye's grandfather's name in the "Mystery of the Ancient Ancestor".
- Jeff Harris (voiced by Shawn Lieber) – An American gymnast boy who's the wise guy of the team with a big ego.
- Woody Daniels (voiced by Phil LaMarr) – An African-American gymnast boy and Jeff's friendly rival. He hopes to become a lawyer when he retires from gymnastics.
- Robin O'Neill (voiced by Amy Linker) – A beautiful, green-eyed redhead gymnast girl with freckles who's eager to jump into any situation. She also acts as Mr. T's second-in-command. She bears a strong resemblance to her late older sister Cathy (see "Secret of the Spectral Sister"). Her catchphrase is "What the hairy heck?"
- Kim Nakamura (voiced by Siu Ming Carson) – A Japanese gymnast girl who is the daughter of a computer scientist. She has a photographic memory that comes in handy as she can remember several magazine articles and book passages, including the issue or volume and the page where she read it.
- Spike O'Neill (voiced by Teddy Field III) – Robin's younger brother who worships Mr. T to the point where he dresses and talks like him. (Note: In Episode 9: "Secret Of The Spectral Sister", it is revealed that "Spike" is just a nickname; his real first name is not revealed.)
- Skye Redfern (voiced by Cathy Cavadini – A Native American gymnast girl whose late grandfather was wrongfully accused of a crime he didn't commit (and was later posthumously exonerated).
- Garcia Lopez (voiced by an unknown actor) – A Latin American gymnast boy whose big brother Miguel is an archaeologist. He is a keen photographer.
- Vince D'Amato (voiced by an unknown actor) – An Italian American gymnast boy who has dreams of being a movie star.
- Courtney Howard (voiced by an unknown actor) – An African-American gymnast girl whose father is a major in the military. Her uncle Ross is a magician who was previously a burglar and now performs under the stage name Cadabra the Great.
- Grant Kline (voiced by an unknown actor) – A juvenile boy who was once an ex-gang member of the Chain Gang who turned his life around and joined Mr. T's gymnastics team, thanks to Jeff.
- Bulldozer – Mr. T's pet bulldog with a similar mohawk. He is also called "Dozer" for short.
- An unnamed blonde girl who was seen on the bus during the season 1 opening intro, but neither spoke nor had her own focus episode.
- A few other non-speaking boy and girl gymnasts who also appear on the show, but neither of them spoke nor had their own focus episode (Note: In Episode 4: "Mystery on the Rocky Mountain Express", it is confirmed by Kim that one of the unnamed gymnast boys is named Lee).

== Episodes ==
=== Series overview ===
Season	Episodes	Originally released	
Season	Episodes	First released	Last released
1	13	September 17, 1983	December 10, 1983
2	11	September 15, 1984	November 24, 1984
3	6	September 14, 1985	October 19, 1985

=== Season 1 (1983) ===
No. overall	No. in season	Title	Written by	Original release date
1	1	"Mystery of the Golden Medallions"	Martin Pasko, Steve Gerber, Flint Dille, and Mark Jones	September 17, 1983
Woody is a new member of the gymnastics team and tries to fit in, but Robin, Jeff, and Kim don't trust him. Elsewhere, men in black suits smash gold medals apart as if looking for something valuable inside them. This leads the team to search around San Francisco for answers to their first mystery. Mr. T's Moral Lesson: Treating new people with respect.
2	2	"Mystery of the Forbidden Monastery"	Flint Dille, Martin Pasko, and Steve Gerber	September 24, 1983
Someone on the team has told the team to meet in New Mexico, USA. While there, they come across a monastery where no one goes. When the team investigates, they start disappearing mysteriously. Mr. T's Moral Lesson: Thinking carefully if you are tempted to do something wrong no matter how the good the reasons are.
3	3	"Mystery of the Mind-Thieves"	Buzz Dixon	October 1, 1983
As the team visits Seattle, Kim's father, Mr. Nakamura, a software designer, is on urgent business with other scientists. However, a mysterious person using a mind-controlling device steals the minds of the scientists, including Mr. Nakamura, to obtain certain knowledge. The team plans to find out the mystery and save the scientists and their minds from this evil foe. Mr. T's Moral Lesson: Not letting a problem bother us, but figuring out what the problem actually is.
4	4	"Mystery on the Rocky Mountain Express"	Martin Pasko	October 8, 1983
The team travels from Salt Lake City on the Rocky Mountain Express to reach another gymnastics meet in Chicago. However, three hooded criminals steal a top-secret biological virus and smuggle it on board. Also on board is a chimpanzee who is immune to the virus. Also, the team tries to help one of their own, Garcia Lopez, who is struggling with gymnastics and has been exposed to the virus. Mr. T's Moral Lesson: Thinking carefully before quitting something when things get tough.
5	5	"The Hundred-Year-Old Mystery"	Flint Dille	October 15, 1983
Mr. T and the team are in Mississippi planning to turn a rundown plantation called "Magnolia House" into a gymnastics camp, but a gang of street car thugs called the Ghost Riders threatened to eliminate the team. Jeff's bragging to a pretty girl gets overheard by the Ghost Riders, who use that information which puts the team in danger. Rumor has it that the original owner of Magnolia House left something behind, and the team has to figure out what it is. Mr. T's Moral Lesson: The dangers of bragging.
6	6	"The Crossword Mystery"	Rick Merwin and Michael Maurer	October 22, 1983
While in Washington, D.C., Ms. Bisby does a crossword puzzle, finding a clue to the puzzle. However, once the word is said, Ms. Bisby falls into a hypnotic state. And she's not the only one. Two college professors are also hypnotized. Mr. T's Moral Lesson: Never taking people for granted.
7	7	"The Ninja Mystery"	Paul Dini	October 29, 1983
The team has a meet in New York City not too far from a movie location, which interests Vince D'Amato, who wants to be an actor. At the same time, a mysterious ninja is robbing stores nearby and is looking for something in particular. The team has to unravel the mystery before the ninja makes a clean getaway. Mr. T's Moral Lesson: Working hard to earn your success.
8	8	"Dilemma of the Double-Edged Dagger"	Flint Dille	November 5, 1983
Mr. T was placed under arrest while the team was in Mexico City where strange thefts from a museum happened. With Mr. T in jail, the team try to help by finding the real criminals and uncover an ancient pyramid. Once inside, the team discovers four Aztec warriors standing in their way. Mr. T's Moral Lesson: Nothing in life is free.
9	9	"Secret of the Spectral Sister"	Martin Pasko, Rick Merwin, Matt Uitz, and Steve Gerber	November 12, 1983
Mr. T and Company visit Robin and Spike's family in Chicago. There Robin is telephoned by...her sister Cathy, who died in a plane crash 5 years ago. (Or did she?) That's when two burglars search Cathy's old bedroom for something the girl was working on at the time of her death (or at least her disappearance). The team must learn what they can about Cathy, in order to sniff out the burglars. Mr. T's Moral Lesson: The danger of believing what you want to believe, to the point of sacrificing your common sense.
10	10	"Mystery of the Silver Swan"	Cliff Ruby and Elana Lesser	November 19, 1983
Bisby's late-night run-in with a classic car called the "Silver Swan" prompts the team staying at Lake Tahoe to investigate. Unknowingly, a local car dealer, museum staff and the car maker's original owner are part of an illegal automobile ring planning to sell duplicate copies of the Silver Swan and other vehicles. Robin tries to do everything for the team so she can get credit for this caper as well as the upcoming meet. Mr. T's Moral Lesson: The importance of working together and not hogging the credit for yourself.
11	11	"Case of the Casino Caper"	Michael Maurer and Matt Uitz	November 26, 1983
"Whatever happens in Vegas, stays in Vegas" unless Mr. T and the team get involved in shutting down a high-stakes operation. Career criminals Hampton and Selby posing as soldiers plan on stealing the Million Dollar Jackpot at the Golden Horseshoe. Courtney tries to go solo to stop the thieves, but her actions might cost the team plenty. It's all or nothing for Mr. T to stop a Sherman tank from destroying a slot machine and making a clean getaway. Mr. T's Moral Lesson: Making your own decision can be tough.
12	12	"Fade Out at 50,000 Feet"	Kimmer Ringwald	December 3, 1983
The team takes a rest in Miami and sees an air show starring Jeff's cousin "The Great Marco". During his air show stunt, which involves dropping a sports car by parachute, he turns up missing causing Jeff to worry. Meanwhile, Woody has fallen for a woman named Vanetta Price who's involved in something Woody doesn't want to know. His jealousy almost got him and the team in hot water as they make their way into the Everglades to try and solve this swamp of a mystery. Mr. T's Moral Lesson: Jealousy is a dangerous thing.
13	13	"Riddle of the Runaway Wheels"	Flint Dille, Paul Dini, Rick Merwin, and Matt Uitz	December 10, 1983
The team heads into Monterey Bay to see an auto stunt show done by the Turbo Team in order to impress a Hollywood director to use their cars for his movie. At the same time, Robin develops a crush on the team's leader. However, a woman and two men are after something and plan on using the Turbo Team's prize automobile, the UltraCar to take it. Mr. T's wheels are spinning to solve this mystery before this caper speeds out of control. Mr. T's Moral Lesson: Not playing games with people's feelings.

=== Season 2 (1984) ===
No. overall	No. in season	Title	Written by	Original release date
14	1	"Mystery in Paradise"	Kimmer Ringwald	September 15, 1984
A disappointing loss at the meet doesn't stop the team from having a good time in Hawaii. Courtney's fear of water would have to be tested when she and the rest of the team encounter modern-day pirates stealing valuable jewels. Mr. T hopes to turn this trouble in paradise into a final luau for the pirates and still have time to enjoy Hawaii with the team. Mr. T's Moral Lesson: Not being afraid of learning something new.
15	2	"Mystery of the Black Box"	Booker Bradshaw	September 22, 1984
The team are in the Canadian town of Churchill, Manitoba, for a small-time skiing before their big meet when they catch a supersonic jet crashing down. Mr. T recovers a black box from the wreckage before it exploded. However, he and the team are now being chased by a group of spies called Snow Raiders who are desperate to get that black box from the team at any cost. It'll take nerves of steel to solve this mystery in the Great White North. Mr. T's Moral Lesson: Not being too proud to ask someone for help.
16	3	"Mystery of the Panthermen"	Rick Merwin	September 29, 1984
On Manzanita Island in the San Francisco Bay, people are being scared away and abducted by a group called the Panthermen who handle a giant panther. Mr. T and the team plan on investigating to uncover clues to the disappearances, while Jeff meets with a newspaper reporter who plans on turning the island into a tourist attraction. At the same time, a shady businessman wants to turn the island into a real estate development. Mr. T's Moral Lesson: Not making money at the expense of others.
17	4	"Mystery of the Ghost Fleet"	Kimmer Ringwald	October 6, 1984
The team is in Baltimore for a meet and Kim puts herself on a crash diet. Suddenly, Mr. T spotted a life jacket belonging to a ship called the Argo which the locals say doesn't exist. Mr. T sets out to investigate where the Argo sank, but as they reach it, the ship blows up. Something's very fishy about this mystery and Mr. T is hoping to catch a bite to solve it. However, Kim's crash diet is weakening both herself and her ability to be part of the team, and Mr. T must help her understand the danger of eating disorders and fad diets. Mr. T's Moral Lesson: Watching your weight carefully, but not overdoing it.
18	5	"Mystery of the Ancient Ancestor"	Kimmer Ringwald and Buzz Dixon	October 13, 1984
The team is in Arizona near a town called Busted Springs owned by the corrupt Rundle family who harbors a more-smaller grudge against Skye's ancestors. To get to the bottom of this Wild West mystery, Mr. T, the team and Bisby's nephew "Showbiz" Ronny, plan to help Skye and find out the truth behind the Redfern/Rundle ruckus 75 years ago. Mr. T's Moral Lesson: Not being quick to judge others for what they are.
19	6	"Magical Mardi Gras Mystery"	Flint Dille and Michael Maurer	October 20, 1984
Mr. T and the team has some time to celebrate Mardi Gras while in New Orleans before the big meet. As they celebrated, they went to a magic show hosted by Ross Howard, Courtney's uncle who was once a con man who paid his debt to society and now works as a magician, under the stage name of Cadabra the Great. However, when a jazz performer's diamond jewelry disappears during a magic act, everyone suspects Uncle Ross reverted to his wicked ways. Someone is framing Cadabra the Great for these crimes and that's what Mr. T needs to find out to close the curtain on this boggle in the bayou. Mr. T's Moral Lesson: Not being quick to make assumptions.
20	7	"Mystery of the Disappearing Oasis"	Janis Diamond	October 27, 1984
Although Mr. T hates flying, he takes his team to Cairo, Egypt to meet Joanna Bakara, Kim's Arab pen pal. Joanna's father is an Egyptologist trying to piece the mystery of the Pyramid of Amenhotep while his greedy comrade Dr. Fasiri and his henchmen kidnap Joanna and her father to get the ruby where Joanna wears. Jeff knows why the ruby was important to unlock the mystery and sets off on his own. Mr. T's Moral Lesson: Always letting your loved ones know where you are going without just taking off.
21	8	"Fortune Cookie Caper"	Flint Dille	November 3, 1984
In the heart of New York City's Chinatown, Mr. T and the team stumbles onto a mysterious string of arsons involving rare goods, including rare books from a bookstore owned by Jeff's parents. The team finds out that Mr. Fong, the owner of a Chinese restaurant, is using fortune cookies with codes and a hired arsonist called the Phantom Firebug as cover to smuggle every rare item out of the country. Mr. T's Moral Lesson: Not letting bad situations keep you down.
22	9	"U.F.O. Mystery"	Matt Uitz	November 10, 1984
Woody's stubbornness about his astigmatism might have cost him a win at the meet in Rapid City, and it continued to get him into more trouble by the fact that he refuses to see an ophthalmologist on the basis that he may be prescribed eyeglasses. He was on his way to see Professor Andrews to see his latest inventions including Mr. T II, a robot version of Mr. T, but the professor was kidnapped. Suddenly, Woody spots a U.F.O. flying overhead. Suddenly, Mr. T and the rest of the team are caught up in an out-of-this-world mystery and an alleged abduction. Mr. T's Moral Lesson: Not putting things off for so long.
23	10	"Mystery of the Stranger"	Kimmer Ringwald	November 17, 1984
"Never ever go with strangers!" That's the lesson Spike had to learn the hard way. While the team was in Hollywood performing as stunt doubles, Spike was offered a hamburger by a married couple, but was stopped by his sister Robin. The couple encountered Spike, telling him that his sister is sick and Spike went along, only to be trapped in the back of their van where two other children were also kidnapped, the objective being for the couple to make money through ransom. When Mr. T and the team's first attempt to rescue Spike fails, they are discouraged. However, Mr. T rallies the team to try once more for Spike and the kids' sake, and that whomever endangers a member of the team messes with Mr. T! While the girls manage to capture the wife, the husband proves too strong for the guys, but Mr. T foils his escape by literally ripping the steering wheel from the van! After Spike and the children are rescued and reunited with their parents, the district attorney says that the man and woman who did that to them are going to prison, but it is first and foremost your responsibility to always be wary of strangers. Mr. T's Moral Lesson: Staying away from strangers.
24	11	"The Cape Cod Caper"	Janis Diamond	November 24, 1984
At the Cape Cod meet, Robin scores a perfect 10, but Spike's accidental picture of what looked like a sea monster overshadows her achievement, causing Robin to be jealous of Spike. For retribution, Robin hopes to take a clearer picture of the monster, but finds herself being captured by oil smugglers planning to steal oil from the Nantucket inlet, and that monster may be part of it. Mr. T, Spike, and the rest of the team must find Robin and get to the bottom of this deep sea mystery. Mr. T's Moral Lesson: Not being jealous of someone else's achievement.

=== Season 3 (1985) ===
No. overall	No. in season	Title	Written by	Original release date
25	1	"The Williamsburg Mystery"	Matt Uitz	September 14, 1985
The team are in Colonial Williamsburg, Virginia to help restoring an old house. Spike ignoring his reading problem lands him in a mess of trouble when two crooks posing as Colonial soldiers raids a Colonial home for directions to a secret cave where a valuable diary is buried. Luckily, Spike makes it out OK, but he has to put his pride in check, while Mr. T and the team get to the bottom of this colossal Colonial caper. Mr. T's Moral Lesson: Not being afraid to ask for help if you have a problem.
26	2	"Mission of Mercy"	Matt Uitz	September 21, 1985
After a successful charity meet, Mr. T takes the team to the city of Samana to receive a cargo ship full of food, water and surplus aid to the village. Unfortunately, a crooked businessman named Saber hires mercenaries to hijack the ship and plan on selling the goods on the black market. Mr. T must now lead his team to find Saber and put him and his gang behind bars, and at the same time to teach the team about how situations in other countries are much different then where they live and rely on surviving in the desert. Mr. T's Moral Lesson: Being grateful for the food you have.
27	3	"Mystery of the Open Crates"	Janis Diamond	September 28, 1985
Heading back to Chicago, Mr. T visits an old friend named Jimmy Stone, the owner of a youth center. At the same time, Courtney visits the gym to hopefully train with gold medalist Sally Owen, which Courtney finds out is more interested in herself than others. Sally's actions would later get her barred for life, but the real big issue is a shady drug dealer named Speedy and his henchmen who plan on framing Jimmy in which to use the youth center for his drug operations. Jimmy helped T get out of a gang during his youth and it's up to T to help him stop Speedy before everything comes tumbling down. Mr. T's Moral Lesson: Picking the people you admire more carefully.
28	4	"The Playtown Mystery"	Richard Merwin	October 5, 1985
Just because someone's young, it doesn't make them worthless nor unbelievable. Jeff and Woody know that for a fact now. Back then, while the team was having a free tour of the Play Town amusement park, Spike saw two of its mascots, Marvin Mouse and Dingy Dog, acting suspicious and no one wanted to believe him. In truth, they were career criminals dressed as mascots in order to retrieve gold bars from an active gold refinery in Play Town's Frontier Town section. Mr. T's Moral Lesson: Never underestimating someone because of their age.
29	5	"The Comeback Mystery"	Matt Uitz and Richard Merwin	October 12, 1985
Heading back to New York City, the team does charity work and a new member of the team named Grant Kline has just signed up. Grant done athletic programs at the same high school as Jeff, but he has a falling out with his old friends, a group of bullies called the Chain Gang and their leader, Blade. They had Grant keep quiet about their activities or they will tell the police about his previous mistake of helping the Chain Gang steal a car, putting him in a precarious position. Mr. T hopes to help Grant erase his past and correct his mistakes in order to break the links to the Chain Gang. Mr. T's Moral Lesson: Making the right kind of friends.
30	6	"The Cape Kennedy Caper"	Janis Diamond	October 19, 1985
An out-of-this-world caper occurs at Kennedy Space Center in Florida's Cape Canaveral. Robin brought her camera to take pictures for her school which Woody tries to take without permission. Suddenly, Robin sees two spies trying to take a photo from inside the shuttle. The spies have been hired by terrorists to blow up the shuttle as soon as it reaches orbit. Unfortunately for Robin, she got captured and it's up to Mr. T and the team to stop the launch, save Robin, and bring the spies to justice in this mystery of a final frontier. Mr. T's Moral Lesson: Respect for other people's property.

== Home media and rights ==
On October 29, 1991, the rights to the library of Ruby-Spears Enterprises, including Mister T, were acquired by Turner Broadcasting System, and the show subsequently aired on Turner-owned cable TV channels such as Boomerang and Cartoon Network. Turner Broadcasting System later merged with Time Warner in 1996, and the rights to the series are currently owned by Warner Bros. Discovery.

The first season was released DVD on May 10, 2011, via the Warner Archive Collection, as part of the Hanna-Barbera Classics Collection.

== See also ==
- Mr. T (comics)
- Mr. T Cereal
