= The Waitresses =

American post-punk band (1978–1983)

- 1982 promotional photo (L-R: Klayman, Ficca, Butler, Wormworth, Williams, Donahue)

Background information
- Origin: Akron, Ohio, U.S.
- Genres: Post-punk; new wave
- Years active: 1978–1983
- Labels: Clone; ZE; Antilles; Island; Polydor; PolyGram; Omnivore Recordings
- Past members: Chris Butler; Patty Donahue; Billy Ficca; Dan Klayman; Mars Williams; David Hofstra; Ariel Warner; Tracy Wormworth; Holly Beth Vincent

The Waitresses were an American post-punk and new wave band from Akron, Ohio, best known for their singles "I Know What Boys Like" and "Christmas Wrapping." The band released two albums, Wasn't Tomorrow Wonderful? and Bruiseology, and one EP, I Could Rule the World If I Could Only Get the Parts.

The group was led by guitarist-songwriter Chris Butler with lead vocals performed by Patty Donahue.

== History ==
The Waitresses were formed by Butler (formerly of the Numbers Band) in 1978 as a side project while he was still a member of Tin Huey. He wrote and recorded "I Know What Boys Like" that year, with guest vocals by friend Donahue (as "Patty Darling") and saxophone from Tin Huey member Ralph Carney, although the song remained unreleased at the time. A debut single, In "Short Stack" (featuring the songs "Slide" and "Clones"), recorded solely by Butler, was issued by Clone Records in 1978. Both tracks from the single, plus another early song, "The Comb", appeared that year on The Akron Compilation, issued by Stiff Records.

Butler moved to New York City and shopped "I Know What Boys Like". The song landed him a deal with ZE Records, which released the single in 1980. It was an underground hit, but did not chart. With the deal in place, Butler put together an actual band lineup for the Waitresses, featuring lead vocalist Donahue, jazz saxophonist Mars Williams, former Television drummer Billy Ficca, keyboardist Dan Klayman, bassist Dave Hofstra and backing vocalist Ariel Warner. The Waitresses played their debut concert on New Year's Eve 1980.

1981 saw the band record its first and most successful album and its most enduring hit. During the recording sessions for the album Wasn't Tomorrow Wonderful? Warner resigned from the band because of stage fright. Later that year, Hofstra quit. He was replaced by Tracy Wormworth, who would supply the bass line for "Christmas Wrapping", a Christmas song written by Butler in August at ZE's insistence.

The Waitresses released Wasn't Tomorrow Wonderful? on January 11, 1982, on the Polydor label, licensed from ZE. It peaked at No. 41 in the Billboard 200 chart. The album included "I Know What Boys Like", which was re-released as a single later in the year and peaked at No. 62 on the Billboard Hot 100, No. 23 on Billboard's Top Tracks chart, No. 14 on the Australian Singles Chart (Kent Music Report), and also charted in the UK. "Christmas Wrapping", originally released on the ZE Records album A Christmas Record in 1981, became a No. 45 hit in the United Kingdom in 1982.

The Waitresses recorded the theme song of the television program Square Pegs. The show stars Sarah Jessica Parker and Amy Linker and aired during the 1982–1983 season. The band appeared as themselves in the pilot episode. Polydor issued the song as a single in 1982; along with "Christmas Wrapping", the track was on the 1982 EP I Could Rule the World If I Could Only Get the Parts.

The band's second album, Bruiseology, was released by Polydor in May 1983. During that summer, Donahue left the band and was replaced by Holly Beth Vincent, formerly of Holly and the Italians, but Vincent herself left after just two weeks and Donahue returned.

The Waitresses split up later in 1983.

== Post-breakup and legacy ==
Butler later worked as a producer, and played with numerous bands and artists including Half Cleveland, Purple K'nif, R. Stevie Moore and Richard Lloyd. Ficca played in Gods and Monsters and returned to his former group Television when they reunited in 1991. Williams played with the Psychedelic Furs, NRG Ensemble, Liquid Soul, Hal Russell and Ken Vandermark. Williams died of ampullary cancer at the age of 68 on November 20, 2023. Wormworth has played bass for the B-52's since 1992.

Donahue died of lung cancer at the age of 40 on December 9, 1996. King Biscuit Flower Hour Presents the Waitresses, a live album recorded in 1982 at My Father's Place in Roslyn, New York, was issued in 1997 by King Biscuit Flower Hour. Polydor issued two compilation albums, The Best of the Waitresses (1990) and 20th Century Masters – The Millennium Collection: The Best of The Waitresses (2003). In 2013, Omnivore Recordings released the compilation Just Desserts: The Complete Waitresses, collecting virtually all of the band's recordings for Polydor, while ZE Records issued a digital collection of their ZE releases, Deluxe Special: Ze Complete Recordings.

"Christmas Wrapping" was covered by the Spice Girls in 1998, as the B-side of their single "Goodbye", which peaked at number 1 in the UK. A version of "I Know What Boys Like" recorded by English female pop duo Shampoo reached No. 42 on the UK Singles Chart in September 1996. The first line in the debut single by American recording artist Chris Brown, "Run It!" references "I Know What Boys Like". "Run It!" topped the charts in the United States, the United Kingdom, Australia and New Zealand. VH1 named the song the 82nd greatest one-hit wonder of all-time in 2002 as well as the 34th greatest one-hit wonder of the 1980s in 2009.

== Personnel ==
- Chris Butler – guitar, backing vocals (1978–1983)
- Patty Donahue – lead vocals (1980–1983, 1983; died 1996)
- David Hofstra – bass guitar (1980–1982)
- Billy Ficca – drums (1980–1983)
- Dan Klayman – keyboards, organ (1980–1983)
- Ariel Warner – backing vocals (1980–1982)
- Mars Williams – saxophone, reed instruments (1980–1983; died 2023)
- Tracy Wormworth – bass guitar, backing vocals (1982–1983)
- Holly Beth Vincent – lead vocals (1983)

== Discography ==
=== Studio albums ===
Year	Title	Peak chart positions		Label
Year	Title	US	AUS	Label
1982	Wasn't Tomorrow Wonderful?	41	84	Polydor
1983	Bruiseology	155	—	Polydor

=== EPs ===
Year	Title	US	Label
1982	I Could Rule the World If I Could Only Get the Parts	128	Polydor

=== Singles ===
Year	Title	Peak chart positions			Certifications	Album
Year	Title	US	AUS	UK	Certifications	Album
1978	In "Short Stack" ("Slide" / "Clones")	—	—	—		Non-album singles
1980	"I Know What Boys Like" / "No Guilt"	—	—	—		Non-album singles
1981	"Christmas Wrapping"	—	—	45	BPI: Platinum	A Christmas Record
1982	"I Know What Boys Like"	62	14	—		Wasn't Tomorrow Wonderful?
1982	"Square Pegs"	—	—	—		I Could Rule the World If I Could Only Get the Parts
1983	"Make the Weather"	—	—	—		Bruiseology
"—" denotes a recording that did not chart or was not released in that territory.

=== Live albums ===
Released	Title	Label
1997	King Biscuit Flower Hour Presents the Waitresses	King Biscuit Flower Hour

=== Compilation albums ===
Year	Title	Label
1990	The Best of the Waitresses	Polydor
2003	20th Century Masters – The Millennium Collection: The Best of the Waitresses	Polydor
2013	Just Desserts: The Complete Waitresses	Omnivore
2013	Deluxe Special: ZE Complete Recordings	ZE
