= The Numbers Band =

American blues rock band

The Numbers Band (a.k.a. 15-60-75) is an American blues rock and experimental rock band formed in Kent, Ohio in 1969. It is part of the locally-based Akron Sound.

== Career ==
The original personnel were Robert Kidney (guitar, lead vocals); Terry Hynde, brother of the Pretenders' Chrissie Hynde (saxophone), Hank Smith (guitar, keyboards); Greg Colbert (bass); and Tim Hutson (drums). They premiered as a live act at the local nightspot The Kove in July 1970. Later, they incorporated jazzy influences as well and they have stuck with their sound ever since.

By 1972, Gerald Casale, future co-founder of Devo (bass), and David Robinson were added to the lineup. Casale was thrown out after wearing a monkey mask onstage. Due to interior pressures, Kidney terminated the project by year's end and joined his brother Jack's band, King of Hearts. However, King of Hearts reformed as a new Numbers Band a few weeks later with a retooled lineup that consisted of the Kidney brothers, Hynde, Drake Gleason (bass) and Jay Brown (drums). After two years of playing gigs, Brown left the band and Robinson came back. Michael Stacey (guitar), was added before the cutting of their 1976 live album Jimmy Bell's Still in Town. By 1977, bassist Gleason had been replaced by Chris Butler, later of Tin Huey and The Waitresses. Butler would later be replaced by bassist Bart Johnson. The Numbers Band, like most of the other Ohioans, never became renowned nationally and were not signed by the major labels.

In 1982, the band released its second album, 15 60 75 The Numbers Band 2, which was its first studio recording. The next year, its single, "Here in the Life", was released through Pere Ubu's David Thomas' label, Hearpen. Fred Tribuzzo later took over the bass playing from Johnson.

The Golden Palominos did their own rendition of the Kidney composition "The Animal Speaks" from Jimmy Bell in 1985. Robert Kidney toured with the Palominos the following year.

The third Numbers Band album, Among The Wandering, was released in 1987. Despite some local success and radio airplay of the single "High Heels Are Dangerous", they remained only locally known. Stacey left in February 1989 and was not replaced. In 1990, Robert Kidney received a kidney transplant, necessitated by a birth defect and complicated by years of hard living. Blues by the Numbers, their second live album, showed up the following year, as did the retrospective, 15 60 75 Twenty. A new studio effort, Hotwire, was released in 1992.

In 1998, Robert and Jack Kidney performed with David Thomas and his "Mirror Man" stage production at the Southbank Center in London. In 2000, the entire Numbers Band performed there. The brothers toured with the troupe in the Netherlands and Canada, and again in Los Angeles in 2003.

In 2003, The Numbers Band were among the rockers profiled in the PBS documentary It's Everything, And Then It's Gone about the Akron Sound. The band then consisted of the Kidney brothers, Hynde, Bill Watson (bass) and Frank Casamento (drums).

They released Inward City in 2009.

In 2010, Anton Fier reunited the Golden Palominos for a limited number of shows in New York City. Robert Kidney joined the performances at The Living Room and Le Poisson Rouge.

In 2011, drummer Frank Casamento left the band and moved to Chicago. Clint Alguire replaced him.

In 2012, Robert Kidney was awarded the Cleveland Arts Prize Lifetime Achievement Award for Music. The CAP created this video:Cleveland Arts Prize, Robert Kidney.

In 2013, the Kidney Brothers released their first duet CD, "Coal Tattoo", on ReR Megacorp Records. That same year, the Numbers Band re-released their first LP, "Jimmy Bell's Still in Town" as a double vinyl LP from Exit Stencil Recordings with three extra tracks which were recorded in the same time period. The band traveled to New York City that December to perform songs from the album at the Bowery Electric. Longtime fan David Fricke from Rolling Stone was in attendance. Fricke wrote the liner notes for the re-release.

Robert Kidney released his first solo effort in early 2016: "JackLeg", a collection of songs written by Robert with acoustic guitar, recorded at Studio G in Brooklyn (released by Exit Stencil Records).

The Numbers Band celebrated their 45th anniversary at The Kent Stage in Kent, Ohio, on October 3, 2015.

In 2020, they released a CD recorded live in the studio, “Endure: Outliers on Water Street”. On February 28, they celebrated their 50th Anniversary at the Kent Stage, performing to a sold-out crowd.

The band sold out the Kent Stage again for their 55th anniversary concert on March 8, 2025, and they continue to perform on a regular basis throughout northeast Ohio.

A full-length film about the band, Out of Obscurity, Into Oblivion by Jason Prufer, premiered at the Cedar Lee Theatre in Cleveland, Ohio, on June 6, 2026.

== Members ==
=== Current ===
- Robert Kidney (founder, guitar, vocals, songwriter)
- Jack Kidney (harmonica, saxophone, guitar, keyboards, percussion, vocals, songwriter)
- Terry Hynde (saxophone)
- Bill Watson (bass)
- Clint Alguire (drums)

=== Former ===
- Chris Butler (bass)
- Hank Smith (guitar, keyboards)
- Steve Calabria (bass)
- Greg Colbert (bass)
- Tim Hutson (drums)
- Michael Bubnow (guitar, bass)
- Gerald Casale (bass)
- Rod Reisman (drums)
- Tim Maglione (sax)
- David Robinson (drums)
- Drake Gleason (bass)
- Jay Brown (drums)
- Michael Stacey (guitar)
- Bart Johnson (bass)
- Fred Tribuzzo (bass)
- Frank Reynolds (bass)
- Frank Casamento (drums)

== Discography ==
- Jimmy Bell's Still in Town (live) (1976) (Hearthen)
- 15 60 75 The Numbers Band 2 (1982) (Water Brothers)
- Among the Wandering (1987) (Water Brothers)
- 15 60 75 20 (1991) (Reedurban)
- Blues By the Numbers (live) (1991) (Reedurban)
- Hotwire (1992) (Reedurban)
- Inward City (2009) (Hearthen)
- Coal Tattoo (2013) (ReR Megacorp)
- Jimmy Bell's Still in Town (reissue) (2013) (Exit Stencil Recordings)
- Endure: Outliers on Water Street (2020) (15-60-75)
