= Square Pegs =

American sitcom (1982–1983)

- Genre: Sitcom
- Created by: Anne Beatts
- Starring: Sarah Jessica Parker; Amy Linker; Merritt Butrick; John Femia; Tracy Nelson; Jami Gertz; Claudette Wells; Jon Caliri; Steven Peterman; Basil Hoffman
- Theme music composer: The Waitresses
- Composers: Tom Scott (pilot); Paul Shaffer ("Special Musical Material", pilot); Jonathan Wolff
- Country of origin: United States
- Original language: English
- No. of seasons: 1
- No. of episodes: 20

Production
- Producers: Anne Beatts; Luciano Martino
- Cinematography: Brianne Murphy; Richard N. Hannah; Emil Oster
- Editors: Joy Kamen; Joy Wilson
- Camera setup: Single camera
- Running time: 22–24 minutes
- Production company: Embassy Television

Original release
- Network: CBS
- Release: September 27, 1982 – March 7, 1983

Square Pegs is an American sitcom that aired on CBS during the 1982–83 season. The series follows Patty Greene (Sarah Jessica Parker) and Lauren Hutchinson (Amy Linker), two awkward teenage girls desperate to fit in at Weemawee High School.

== Synopsis ==
Created by former Saturday Night Live writer Anne Beatts, the pilot introduces an eclectic group of eight freshmen on their first day at Weemawee High School. The series was much acclaimed by critics at the time for its realistic look at teenage life, reflecting a sensibility somewhat similar to the John Hughes teen comedies of later years. The actual location of the suburban community served by Weemawee is never specified, but Beatts had grown up and attended high school in Somers, New York, about an hourlong commute from New York City.

== Characters ==
Sarah Jessica Parker as Patty Greene in the episode "It's All How You See Things"

Patty Greene (Sarah Jessica Parker) is clever and seemingly well-adjusted, but feels awkward and like a social misfit (i.e. a square peg) when with the "popular" students. Patty's close friend Lauren Hutchinson (Amy Linker) constantly desires to be in with the "in" crowd, and the series' episodes often revolve around her dragging Patty into various schemes in attempts to make them both more popular.

Lauren and Patty are surrounded by colorful supporting characters. Their friends Marshall Blechtman (John Femia) and Johnny "Slash" Ulasewicz (Merritt Butrick) are a pair of lovable geeks. Marshall is a motormouthed would-be comedian, while Johnny is a soft-spoken new wave fan (not punk... "a totally different head... totally.") Though seemingly off in his own world most of the time, Johnny states that he "[does not] do drugs and isn't a hippie" and on more than one occasion displays unexpected intuition and empathy, particularly regarding Marshall and the girls. The two boys help maintain the school radio station. Several scenes indicate that Marshall is attracted to Lauren and Johnny to Patty.

The popular kids whom Patty and Lauren are usually trying to impress are Jennifer DiNuccio (Tracy Nelson), the quintessential shallow Valley girl, her boyfriend Vinnie Pasetta (Jon Caliri), a handsome greaser hood, and LaDonna Fredericks (Claudette Wells), Jennifer's friend and the sole minority character in the cast. Vinnie is cool but dense, and LaDonna is given to sassy remarks.

The typical official high school activity culture is personified by preppy Muffy B. Tepperman (Jami Gertz), the endlessly chipper chairwoman of the Weemawee Pep Committee, head of the Morals Club, chair of the Science Fair Committee and a member of the Future Nurses of America. Muffy has a memorably pompous, oratorical speaking style and begins many sentences with "It behooves me to tell you..." or an elongated "People...". Though perhaps socially inept ("I’m going to ignore that because, frankly, I don't get it"), Muffy's unawareness and/or lack of concern with her failure to fit in with the popular kids is in stark contrast to the motivation of the show's protagonists, and does not stop her from relentless involvement in school activities. She shows her partial disdain for Patty and Lauren by calling them "String Bean" and "Fang" and the "gruesome twosome"

An ongoing gag throughout the series is Muffy's fundraising for Weemawee's adopted "little Guatemalan child," Rosarita. As the series progresses, Muffy's charitable intentions become more and more frivolous, asking the school community to provide the girl with her own apartment away from her parents, cable TV, a second pair of culottes, swimwear, a split-level duplex, and finally, her own cleaning lady.

This group of eight students, though clearly of varied academic standing, are always in the same classes.

The recurring staff members at the school are:

- Ms. Alison Loomis (Catlin Adams), a feminist liberal arts teacher who often complains about her ex-husband
- Mr. Rob "Lovebeads" Donovan (Steven Peterman), who continuously brings up his antics in the 1960s and always stops just short of completing references to smoking pot
- Mr. John Michael Spacek (Craig Richard Nelson), the affected but married drama teacher
- Dr. Winthrop Dingleman (Basil Hoffman), the grinning, square principal

Series creator Anne Beatts appeared in two episodes as Miss Rezucha.

Home life of the students is rarely depicted, but Patty's father is prominently featured in the Christmas episode. He is played by Tony Dow, best known as Wally Cleaver in Leave It to Beaver.

== Production ==
=== Creative staff ===
The show was unusual for an American sitcom of the time in having a largely female writing room, at Beatts' instigation. Twelve of the 20 produced episodes were written entirely by women, with another 3 being co-written by women. As well, half the episodes were directed by women.

=== Show opening ===
Before the opening credits and theme song begin, every episode starts with the following dialogue appearing in a montage of stills from the school:

Lauren: Listen. I've got this whole high school thing psyched out. It all breaks down into cliques.
Patty: Cliques?
Lauren: Yeah, you know. Cliques. Little in-groups of different kids. All we have to do is click with the right clique, and we can finally have a social life that's worthy of us.
Patty: No way! Not even with cleavage.
Lauren: I tell you, this year we're going to be popular.
Patty: Yeah?
Lauren: Yeah. Even if it kills us.

=== Series cancellation ===
Square Pegs creator Anne Beatts revealed to TV Guide in 1984, a year after the series was canceled, "I think that certainly, there was some drug abuse or drug traffic that may have happened, because I would say that that is norm for a set." Devo member Gerald Casale also confirmed in 2009 the rumors of drug use on set, saying: "The girls were out of control — they were doing drugs and they were making out and they were coming on to us in a big way... They might have been 15 or 16, but in their heads they were already 40. I don’t think there was a virgin on the set, except maybe a couple of the guys".

Most of the show's scenes were filmed at the abandoned Excelsior High School in suburban Norwalk, California. Because Norwalk was twenty miles from Norman Lear's studio office and CBS Television in Los Angeles, it was hard for the producers or the network to know what was happening during filming. Embassy Television received numerous reports of drug and alcohol abuse in the presence of minors, which caused Embassy President Michael Grade to ask for an investigation and led him to pull the plug on the show shortly after the first season finished production. Cast members Jon Caliri and Tracy Nelson have adamantly denied that any of the minors in the cast were involved with drugs (although not denying that there may have been drug abuse amongst the crew).

Beatts herself maintained "... drugs, ego, and chaos did not kill Square Pegs. Low ratings did. The highest audience share Square Pegs ever received was a 24, which now [in 2020] would make you the queen of Hollywood, but was considered inadequate for CBS, then the leading 'Tiffany network.'"

=== Music ===
The show's opening and closing theme songs, "Square Pegs" and an untitled instrumental composed by Tom Scott, are performed by The Waitresses. In some episodes, the instrumental is the opening theme and "Square Pegs" the closing theme, and in others these are reversed.

- The Waitresses appear in the premiere episode performing as themselves. They play "I Know What Boys Like" during a scene at the school dance, and "Square Pegs" in a scene during the closing credits, with the characters dancing along. Their song "Christmas Wrapping" also plays in the show's hangout diner (The Grease) during the Christmas episode.
- John Densmore, original drummer for The Doors, plays himself as a member of Johnny Slash's New Wave band, Open 24 Hours, in the episode "Open 24 Hours" (episode #8). He also is the drummer in Johnny's band, renamed Open 48 Hours, in "Muffy's Bat Mitzvah" (episode #9).
- Also performing in "Muffy's Bat Mitzvah" is the new wave band Devo, appearing as themselves.
- Rockabilly band Jimmy & The Mustangs perform in the final episode, "The Arrangement".
- Radio and television personality Richard Blade makes a cameo as himself in "Muffy's Bat Mitzvah" and "The Arrangement".
- Billy Idol's song "Dancing with Myself" is featured in episode #18 ("No Substitutions"), which guest starred Bill Murray as a substitute teacher. The song is replaced with generic music in the show's DVD release for licensing reasons, but the original audio is in the version of the episode available on iTunes.

The music supervision for the show was handled by Stephen Elvis Smith, although he is credited as Program Coordinator, and later as Associate Producer. The 2008 DVD release, which included interviews with the cast, was directed by Stephen Smith and produced by his company Abbey Entertainment.

== Episodes ==
No.	Title	Directed by	Written by	Original release date	Prod. code
1	"Pilot"	Kim Friedman	Anne Beatts	September 27, 1982	101
Freshman Patty gets the chance to "click with the right clique" when she attracts the attention of a handsome senior. Guest Stars: The Waitresses
2	"A Cafeteria Line"	Kim Friedman	Janis Hirsch	October 4, 1982	102
The romantic leads in the school musical lead to romance for Patty and Vinnie.
3	"Pac Man Fever"	Terry Hughes	Marjorie Gross	October 11, 1982	105
Marshall loses his comic touch when he becomes possessed by a video game. His only hope for salvation: exorcism by the cleric of comedy, Father Guido Sarducci.
4	"Square Pigskins"	Kim Friedman	Andy Borowitz	October 18, 1982	104
Lauren talks Patty into joining the Weemawee girls football team — coached by a gung-ho army vet and a women's libber who bristles at the slightest slight.
5	"Halloween XII"	Terry Hughes	Marjorie Gross and Susan Silver	November 1, 1982	109
The Weemawee High School Halloween dance gets canceled when Muffy spends the entire budget on unnecessary decorations. She feels so guilty that she begs Ms. Loomis to have a slumber party for the girls; Patty and Lauren see this as an opportunity to join in with the popular girls. The girls become scared when they hear noises outside, only to discover that it is Vinnie, Johnny and Marshall. They all calm down until they think they see a dark, monster-like figure moving towards the door.
6	"A Simple Attachment"	Terry Hughes	David Felton	November 8, 1982	107
Hopelessly in love with Lauren, Marshall takes an opportunity with the science fair to build a "love detector." His project backfires on him. It also causes problems for happy couples by making other love matches for them.
7	"Weemaweegate"	Kim Friedman	Chris Miller and Michael Sutton	November 15, 1982	108
Vinnie is attempting to become the school mascot but keeps running into problems. School newspaper reporters Patty and Lauren decide to investigate the strange happenings. The clues quickly point to Marshall, but it is possible he is being set up.
8	"Open 24 Hours"	Kim Friedman	Deanne Stillman	November 22, 1982	106
Marshall becomes Johnny's manager and books his band, a band no one has ever seen, for the gala opening of a supermarket deli counter.
9	"Muffy's Bat Mitzvah"	Kim Friedman	Margaret Oberman and Rosie Shuster	November 29, 1982	113
When she leaves them off her guest list, Lauren and Patty scheme to get invited to Muffy's bat mitzvah party. Guest Stars: Devo
10	"Hardly Working"	Terry Hughes	Andy Borowitz and Janis Hirsch	December 13, 1982	112
Jennifer does the uncoolest thing possible: she gets a job.
11	"A Child's Christmas in Weemawee: Part 1"	Terry Hughes	Marjorie Gross and Janis Hirsch	December 20, 1982	115
Patty's in a quandary: should she spend Christmas in an isolated cabin with her divorced father, or the way she'd prefer — with her friends at school?
12	"A Child's Christmas in Weemawee: Part 2"	Terry Hughes	Marjorie Gross and Janis Hirsch	December 20, 1982	116
Patty wants to patch things up with her dad in time to still attend the all-important Weemawee Christmas party.
13	"It's All How You See Things"	Kim Friedman	Janis Hirsch	December 27, 1982	110
Patty thinks that wearing glasses is the cause of her problems, and therefore decides to stop wearing them.
14	"Merry Pranksters"	Kim Friedman and James Nasella Jr.	Deanne Stillman	January 10, 1983	111
To gain popularity Patty and Lauren become expert pranksters. The joke is on them, however, when someone else gets credit for their stunts.
15	"It's Academical"	Terry Hughes	Andy Borowitz	January 24, 1983	114
The kids are excited when Dan Vermillion (Martin Mull), host of channel 124's quiz show It's Academical (parody of It's Academic), announces that Weemawee High School has just been selected to compete. This will be a big competition since they will face their arch-rivals, Henry Wadsworth Longfellow Tech. Patty is selected along with Muffy and Larry Simpson since they have the three highest grade point averages. Patty sees this as another chance to gain popularity, and maybe Larry as a boyfriend.
16	"The Stepanowicz Papers"	Terry Hughes	Susan Silver	January 31, 1983	103
When Mr. Stepanowicz starts his new job as the school janitor, Lauren dreams of becoming Mrs. Stepanowicz. Patty tries to talk some sense into her friend, but it looks like Lauren needs to learn the hard way.
17	"To Serve Weemawee All My Days"	Kim Friedman	Andy Borowitz and Janis Hirsch	February 5, 1983	117
Mr. Donovan's job is in jeopardy because the school board has discovered he is living with a woman.
18	"No Substitutions"	Kim Friedman	Andy Borowitz	February 14, 1983	119
Jack McNulty (Bill Murray) is a substitute teacher who fills in for Ms. Loomis while she is in Reno for a teacher conference. Mr. McNulty sets the kids up with mock marriages to teach them about life, and he quickly becomes their favorite teacher. The kids end up learning a life lesson, just not the one that was planned.
19	"No Joy in Weemawee"	James Nasella Jr.	Marjorie Gross and Deanne Stillman	February 21, 1983	118
The Weemawee Braves are holding baseball tryouts when star pitcher Vinnie harasses Johnny until he finally has had enough and takes a turn at bat. Johnny hits three consecutive pitches for home runs and immediately makes the team. Coach Donovan is beside himself since his school has not won a single baseball game since 1955. Guest Stars: Steve Sax
20	"The Arrangement"	Craig Richard Nelson	Anne Beatts and David Skinner	March 7, 1983	120
Vinnie needs Patty to help him study for a big math test. If he does not pass it, he cannot have the party he wants to throw to celebrate his six-month anniversary with Jennifer. By helping Vinnie, Patty and Lauren think the popular kids at school will finally accept them.

== Release ==
=== Broadcast ===
Square Pegs debuted on CBS September 27, 1982 in the 8 P.M. Monday slot, and remained in that slot throughout its one-season run. The show struggled in the ratings against That's Incredible on ABC. WGBO in Chicago showed reruns of the series in early 1986, and episodes were shown on USA Network in the mid-1990s, and later on Nickelodeon/Nick@Nite, Nick at Nite’s TV Land, MeTV and Decades (now Catchy Comedy). Square Pegs was recently aired on Catchy on January 28, 2024 during the "Catchy Binge", and again on August 24, 2025, airing alongside Ferris Bueller. It joined the official lineup on September 6, 2025, currently airing Saturdays at 8 A.M. ET.

=== Home media ===
Sony Pictures Home Entertainment released the entire series on DVD in a 3-disc set on May 20, 2008, to coincide with the theatrical release of Sarah Jessica Parker's film Sex and the City: The Movie. On the DVDs, the episodes have been digitally remastered and include eight featurettes called "Weemawee Yearbook Memories." Each featurette focuses on a different cast member and has new interviews with the actors and creator Anne Beatts.

Also on the DVD are two minisodes from 1980s sitcoms The Facts of Life and Silver Spoons.

Because the two parts of "A Child's Christmas in Weemawee" appear together as one episode, the DVD packaging states that it includes 19 episodes rather than 20.

On August 27, 2013, it was announced that Mill Creek Entertainment had acquired the rights to various television series from the Sony Pictures library including Square Pegs. They re-released the complete series on DVD on October 21, 2014. Unlike Sony Pictures Home Entertainment release, the Mill Creek Entertainment release is two discs instead of three and the featurettes in the former release are not included in the latter release.

== Reception ==
US TV Ratings

Season	Episodes	Start date	End date	Nielsen rank	Nielsen rating
1982-83	22	September 27, 1982	March 7, 1983	58	N/A

== Footnotes ==
- Browne, David (July 13, 2008). "Carrie Bradshaw, Teenage Geek". The New York Times.
