= Contents Dislodged During Shipment =

Studio album by Tin Huey
- Released: 1979
- Studio: Warner Bros., North Hollywood, California
- Genre: Art rock
- Length: 31:33
- Label: Warner Bros.
- Producer: Paul Wexler

Tin Huey chronology
Breakfast with the Hueys (1978)	Contents Dislodged; During Shipment (1979)	English Kids (1980)

Contents Dislodged During Shipment is an album by American rock band Tin Huey, released on March 2, 1979, by Warner Bros. Records. Even though their cover of the Monkees' "I'm a Believer" was a minor hit, Contents Dislodged During Shipment was a commercial failure and Warner Bros. dropped the band in early 1980.

== Recording ==
The album's title came from a pizza box Harvey Gold saw during the planning of the album that was labeled with the title as a warning. Gold decided the warning described what the band meant.

== Release and commercial reception ==
The album sold poorly. Following the release, Tin Huey and Warner Bros. Records negotiated a separation.

== Critical reception ==
Professional ratings
Review scores
Source	Rating
Christgau's Record Guide	B+

Reviewing in Christgau's Record Guide: Rock Albums of the Seventies (1981), Robert Christgau wrote: "They get arch at times, both lyrically [...] and in rhythm changes and instrumental breaks that betray an art-rock heritage. But like Pere Ubu, these Akron boys make art-rock that rocks, with chops you can enjoy for all the music's sake. And if their humor is collegiate, I'm a sophomore." Trouser Press said that "their blend of blues, jazz and progressive rock is hilariously unique, offering up a warped vision of Middle America."

Writing for The New York Times in 1979, John Rockwell commented that the album "lacks the sharp, rhythmic impetus of both Devo and Talking Heads, the sort of structurally spare bands that would appear to be its most immediate inspirations", continuing that "the record still has merit, and the band's direct linkage of the pulse of rock with the drive of industrial‐age machinery [...] is especially striking."

== Track listing ==
Side one
No.	Title	Writer(s)	Length
1.	"I'm a Believer"	Neil Diamond	3:16
2.	"The Revelations of Dr. Modesto"	Harvey Gold	3:57
3.	"I Could Rule the World if I Could Only Get the Parts"	Chris Butler	3:17
4.	"Coronation"	Butler, Gold	2:25
5.	"Slide"	Butler	2:40
Total length:			15:35

Side two
No.	Title	Writer(s)	Length
6.	"Hump Day"	Butler	2:59
7.	"Pink Berets"	Butler, Gold	3:04
8.	"Squirm You Worm"	Mark Price, Gold	2:32
9.	"Chinese Circus"	Michael Aylward, Gold	1:48
10.	"Puppet Wipes"	Ralph Carney, Gold	2:35
11.	"New York's Finest Dining Experience"	Aylward, Gold	3:00
Total length:			15:58

== Personnel ==
- Chris Butler – guitar, percussion, birdcalls, vocals
- Harvey Gold – piano, synthesizer, guitar, vocals
- Michael Aylward – guitar, slide guitar, vocals
- Mark Price – bass, vocals
- Stuart Austin – drums, percussion, Synare drum synthesizer, vocals
- Ralph Carney – bass, tenor, alto and soprano saxophone, clarinet, organ, percussion, piano, harmonica, vocals, "large nose, duck calls"
