= Chris Butler (musician) =

American musician, writer and artist (born 1949)

- Born: May 22, 1949 (age 77)
- Origin: Ohio, U.S.
- Genres: New wave
- Instrument: Guitar
- Years active: 1978–1996

Christopher Butler (born May 22, 1949) is an American musician, writer, and artist who is best known for leading the 1980s new wave band The Waitresses. His notable songs include "I Know What Boys Like", "No Guilt", "Christmas Wrapping" and the theme song for the TV sitcom Square Pegs.

== Early life and career ==
Butler is of Italian and Hungarian ancestry. He grew up in Akron, Moreland Hills, and Chagrin Falls, Ohio, and majored in sociology at Kent State University. He was among a crowd of students fired on by the Ohio National Guard on May 4, 1970, and was a friend of Jeffrey Miller, one of the four students killed by Guardsmen. Butler had lent Miller his drum kit before the shootings.

Butler was active in Kent, Ohio's 1970s music and art scene that also spawned The James Gang, Devo, and Chrissie Hynde of The Pretenders. He appeared in several films by KSU film professor Richard Myers and played guitar in the blues band City Lights with Jack Kidney. He followed Kidney into The Numbers Band, aka 15–60–75, founded by Jack's brother Robert Kidney, and played bass with them from 1975 to 1978. Butler was fired from the band for skipping a rehearsal to attend a photo session for his Waitresses band project, which were to be part of Stiff Records' Akron Compilation, which also included tracks by Tin Huey, Jane Aire and The Belvederes, Rachel Sweet, Rubber City Rebels, The Bizarros and Chi-Pig.

== 1980s ==
In 1983, Butler went to Denmark and produced the second album by the punk/art band Sort Sol.

Starting to get work as a producer, Butler commuted daily to Water Music Studios in Hoboken, New Jersey, during the recording of Scruffy The Cat's Tiny Days album (1987), and Joan Osborne's Relish EP (1995). He had two cars break down on the Long Island Expressway.

To help songwriter Freedy Johnston get a contract with Bar None Records, Butler played drums with bassist Rich Grula. Butler later produced Johnston's 1989 album The Trouble Tree and played guitar on some of the album's tracks.

== 1990s and after ==
In 1995, Butler was hired by former Tin Huey keyboardist Harvey Gold, now a TV producer in New York City, as drummer and bandleader for "Two Drink Minimum", a stand-up showcase program for Comedy Central.

He holds the 1997 Guinness Book of World Records for the longest pop song recording, a 69-minute song entitled "The Devil Glitch”. The project was expanded online as "The Major Glitch", and accepted additions to the song in the hopes that it would play for days. The song reached 3:13:32.

In 1997, Butler started Future Fossil Records and released his first album I Feel A Bit Normal Today. In 2001, he released Kilopop!'s Un Petit Goûter, a fictional European band's "Best Of". "I've always been a songwriter, and over the years I've been asked to write Waitress-y type tunes for other singers... but none of them were ever used. I had quite a pile of these, plus some fun co-writes lying around gathering dust... so I invented a fake European band that supposedly had had 'hits' with these tunes. I wanted to be a success in Europe, and since this didn't happen in reality, I decided to make it so in fantasy."

In 1987, Butler sold his musical gear, including "Bebe Blue", the Vox Teardrop electric guitar he used to record "Christmas Wrapping", to a Manhattan music store. More than 20 years later, the store's owners told him that the guitar's latest owner, a woman in Belgium, wanted to sell it to someone who could appreciate its significance. Butler hopped on a plane and repurchased it, though he could not convince himself that the guitar was in fact the one he owned before.

Butler owns the Akron house where serial killer Jeffery Dahmer grew up and killed his first victim.

== Bands that involved Chris Butler ==
- 15-60-75 (The Numbers Band)
- Tin Huey
- The Waitresses
- The Cranks
- Half Cleveland
- purplE k'niF
- Richard Lloyd
- The Wirebirds
- Otis Ball and the Chains
- Life in a Blender
- The dB's
- KILOPOP!

== Discography ==
=== Tin Huey ===
- Tin Huey EP (Clone Records, 1977)
- Breakfast with the Hueys EP (Clone Records, 1978)
- Contents Dislodged During Shipment (Warner Bros. Records, 1979)
- English Kids EP (Clone Records, 1980)
- Disinformation (Future Fossil Records, 1999)
- Sneak Peek: The Obscurity Series (2004)
- Before Obscurity: The Bushflow Tapes (Smog Veil Records, 2009)

=== The Waitresses ===
==== Albums ====
- Wasn't Tomorrow Wonderful? (1982)
- I Could Rule the World If I Could Only Get the Parts (1982)
- Bruiseology (1983)
- Make the Weather (1984)
- King Biscuit Flower Hour Presents The Waitresses (1997)

==== Compilation albums ====
- The Best of the Waitresses (1990)
- 20th Century Masters – The Millennium Collection: The Best of the Waitresses (2003)
- Your Choice of Sides − A Collection of Outtakes & Obscuriosities (2007)
- Just Desserts: The Complete Waitresses (2013)
- Deluxe Special: ZE Complete Recordings (2013)

=== Solo ===
- The Devil Glitch (1996)
- I Feel a Bit Normal Today (1997)
- Easy Life (2002)
- alt.easylife.cd (2002)
- The Museum of Me Vol. 1 (2002)
- Songs for Unsung Holidays (2018)
- Got It Togehter! (2018)

=== Kilopop! ===
- Un Petit Goûter (2001)
