= Tracy Wormworth =

American bassist (born 1958)

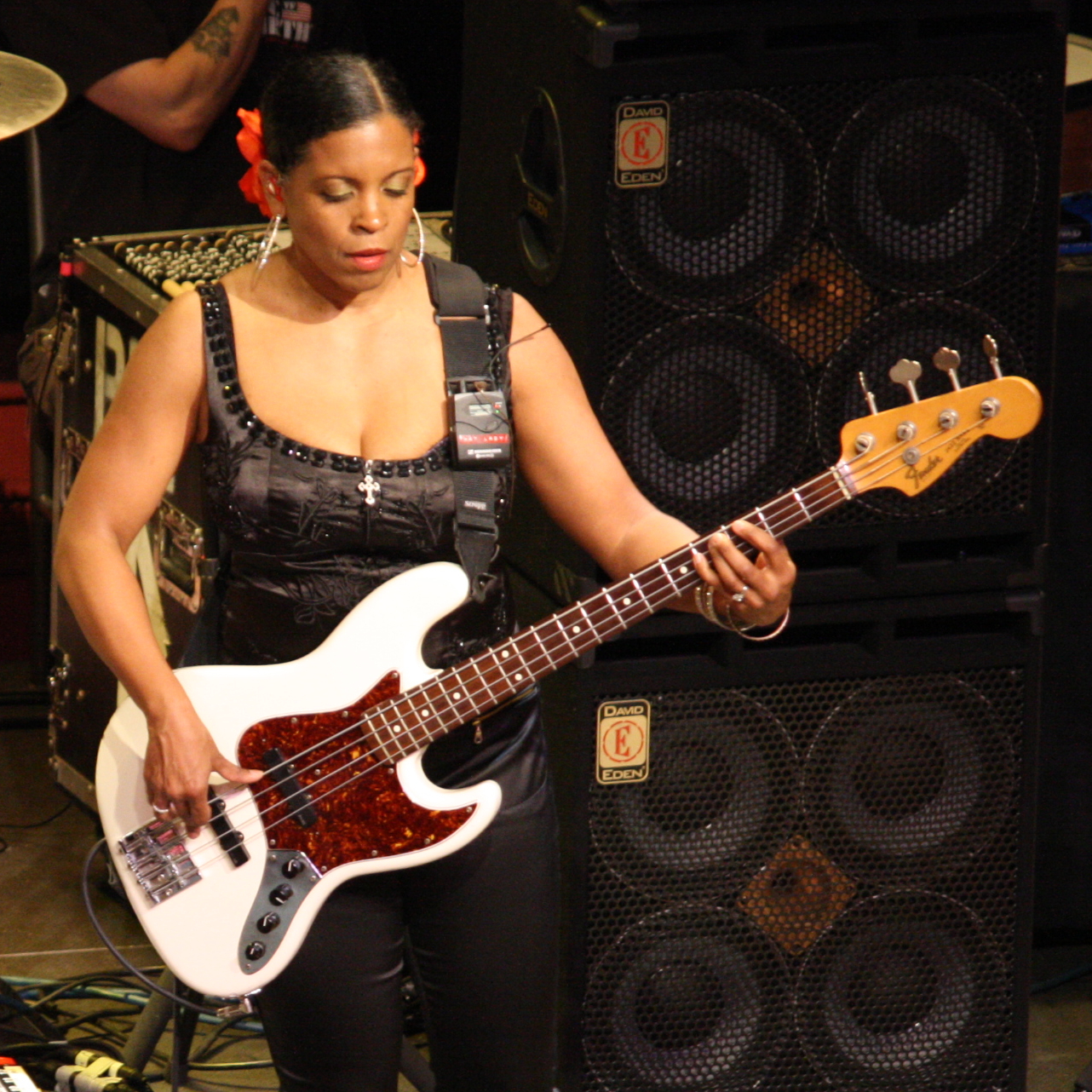
- Wormworth performing with The B-52s in 2009

Background information
- Born: Tracy Ann Wormworth; December 15, 1958 (age 67); New York City, New York, U.S.
- Genres: New wave; alternative rock
- Occupation: Musician
- Instrument: Bass

Tracy Ann Wormworth (born December 15, 1958) is an American bass guitarist who has played with the B-52s since 1992. She was a member of the Waitresses and has been a session player for numerous acts.

== Career ==
Wormworth's career began when she joined the Waitresses, a new wave band from Akron, Ohio. She joined after the departure of Dave Hofstra, who played on the Waitresses' first album, Wasn't Tomorrow Wonderful? Wormworth appears in the back cover photo on the album. The Waitresses dissolved in 1984.

Wormworth began playing with the B-52s in 1990. She played on their sixth studio album, 1992's Good Stuff, and recorded on their soundtrack for the 1994 film The Flintstones. By 2008, she was listed as an official band member on their album Funplex; she is featured in the 2011 video recording With the Wild Crowd! Live in Athens, GA.

Wormworth has been a touring bass player for Sting and Wayne Shorter, Cyndi Lauper, Phyllis Hyman, the jazz violinist Regina Carter, the vocalists Rachelle Ferrell and Joan Osborne. She was part of the house band on The Rosie O'Donnell Show, where she performed with artists including Little Richard and Liza Minnelli. She recorded on the Lena Horne album We'll Be Together Again (1994), I Ain't Movin' (1994) by the singer-songwriter Des'ree, Head over Heels (1995) by Paula Abdul, and Regina Carter's Something for Grace. She has worked with the Family Stand, Rachel Z, and Moby.

== Family ==
Wormworth is the sister of the Conan O'Brien Show drummer James Wormworth, the daughter of the jazz drummer Jimmy Wormworth, and the sister of the vocalist Mary Wormworth.

== Discography ==
With Paula Abdul

- Head over Heels (Virgin/EMI, 1995)

With The B-52's

- Good Stuff (Reprise/Warner Bros., 1992)
- Funplex (Astralwerks/Caroline/Virgin/EMI, 2008)
- With the Wild Crowd! Live in Athens, GA (Eagle/Universal, 2011)

With Des'ree

- I Ain't Movin' (550 Music/Epic/SME, 1994

With Lena Horne

- We'll Be Together Again (Blue Note/Capitol/EMI, 1994)

With Houston Person

- The Opening Round (Savant, 1997)

With David Lee Roth

- Diamond Dave (Magna Carta, 2003)

With The Waitresses

- Christmas Wrapping (ZE, 1981)
- Wasn't Tomorrow Wonderful? (Polydor/PolyGram, 1982)
- I Could Rule the World If I Could Only Get the Parts (Polydor/PolyGram, 1982)
- Bruiseology (Polydor/PolyGram, 1983)
