= I Know What Boys Like =

1980 single by the Waitresses

Single by the Waitresses

from the album Wasn't Tomorrow Wonderful?
- B-side: "No Guilt"
- Released: 1980
- Genre: New wave
- Label: ZE; Polydor
- Songwriter: Chris Butler
- Producers: Chris Butler; Kurt Munkacsi

The Waitresses singles chronology
"In 'Short Stack'" (1978)	"I Know What Boys Like" (1980)	"Christmas Wrapping" (1981)

"I Know What Boys Like" is a song by the Waitresses, written by guitarist Chris Butler in 1978, while he was still a member of the rock band Tin Huey.

It was recorded by Butler and released as a single in 1980, but beyond some club success, it did not appear on any charts. When he formed the band the Waitresses, with Patty Donahue as lead vocalist, the band recorded the song for its debut album, Wasn't Tomorrow Wonderful?, released by Polydor Records in 1982.

== Charts ==
"I Know What Boys Like" was released as a single from the album and peaked at number 62 the week of May 29, 1982 on the Billboard Hot 100.

Chart (1982)	Peak position
Australia (Kent Music Report)	14
US Billboard Hot 100	62
US Billboard Top Tracks	23
US Cash Box	74

== Appearances in pop culture ==
The Waitresses' version of the song appeared on the soundtrack of the 1987 film I Was a Teenage Zombie.

The song was used for the opening of the episode entitled "Monster" (S1 E10) that was the season and series finale of Lucy, the Daughter of the Devil.

VH1 named the song the 82nd greatest one-hit wonder of all-time in 2002 as well as the 34th greatest one-hit wonder of the 1980s in 2009.

The song was performed in the second season of Glee by Ashley Fink's character, Lauren.

The Waitresses' version of the song appeared on the soundtrack of the films The Last American Virgin (1982) and Thanksgiving (2023).

In the Family Guy episode "Boys Do Cry", Herbert sings this song while auditioning to be the new church organist, the lyrics doubling as a reference to him being a pedophile.

In the movie Hercules Returns, Machismo sings this song while riding his horse, Cyril, the lyrics being an allusion to his homosexuality.

== Cover versions ==
New Jersey punk rock band The Bouncing Souls covered the song on their album The Good, the Bad, and the Argyle.

The Party covered the song for their EP, In The Meantime, In Between Time.

A version by British female pop duo Shampoo reached No. 42 on the UK Singles Chart in September 1996.

In the 2008 comedy The House Bunny, Katharine McPhee, Kat Dennings, Rumer Willis & Emma Stone perform the song.

The 2013 Disney Channel Original Movie, Teen Beach Movie features the song Like Me, in which the song is covered in the chorus.
