= Patty Donahue =

American singer (1956–1996)

- Donahue in 1982

Background information
- Born: Patricia Jean Donahue; March 29, 1956; Akron, Ohio, U.S.
- Died: December 9, 1996 (aged 40); New York City, U.S.
- Genre: New wave
- Instruments: Vocals; guitar
- Years active: 1978–1996
- Formerly of: The Waitresses

Patricia Jean Donahue (March 29, 1956 – December 9, 1996) was an American singer. She was the lead vocalist of the American new wave band the Waitresses, known for the singles "I Know What Boys Like" and "Christmas Wrapping".

== Early life ==
Patricia Jean Donahue was born on March 29, 1956, in Akron, Ohio. Her parents divorced when she was two years old. She told an interviewer that her mother raised her to be an independent woman.

Like her mother and sister, Donahue attended St. Joseph Academy in Cleveland. She studied at Ohio State University but dropped out for financial reasons. She tried to finish at Cleveland State University but left there too, dissatisfied with the school. She eventually graduated from Kent State University. In her early 20s, before joining The Waitresses, she worked as a waitress.

== Music career ==
Donahue met Chris Butler while at Kent State. Butler was in the art rock band Tin Huey but he had written a number of songs that were not used in their repertoire. As he later explained in the liner notes of The Best of the Waitresses (1990), he met Donahue in a barroom challenge: "One day I write this song and then it's noon and the liquid lunchers are packed into a...bar. I stand on a chair and bang a beer bottle for attention and declare: 'I need a chanteuse to coo a tune. The song is funny and stupid and cool and different and is anybody interested?' A voice in the back says, 'Uh-huh.' It's Patty."

Donahue was among the performers who developed a new standard for women in rock music during the new wave era. Although Butler was the leader and songwriter of the Waitresses, fans and music journalists often singled out Donahue as the band's primary asset. Butler wrote the lyrics but, as Rolling Stone asserted, "Donahue is no pop-band puppet". She rejected the notion that she was simply singing another person's words: "I'm relating my experiences too" she told an interviewer; "He wrote the songs, but I'm not just singing what he feels". Syndicated music columnist Hugh Wyatt praised her as an exceptional artist despite her lack of formal training, describing her as "one of only a handful of rock singers who has truly harnessed the attitudinal appraoch of post punk".

During the recording of the second and final Waitresses' album Bruiseology, Donahue left the band and was replaced temporarily by Holly Beth Vincent before Donahue rejoined soon afterward. Donahue was sought personally by Alice Cooper to duet with him on the single "I Like Girls". Cooper exuberantly told an interviewer: "I'd be driving in the car ... and every time I'd want to turn up the radio, it was Patty Donahue." "I Like Girls" appears on Cooper's album Zipper Catches Skin with Donahue credited for "vocals and sarcasm".

Soon Donahue stepped away from performance altogether. She took work as a talent scout for MCA Publishing and later became an A&R rep for MCA Records.

== Death ==
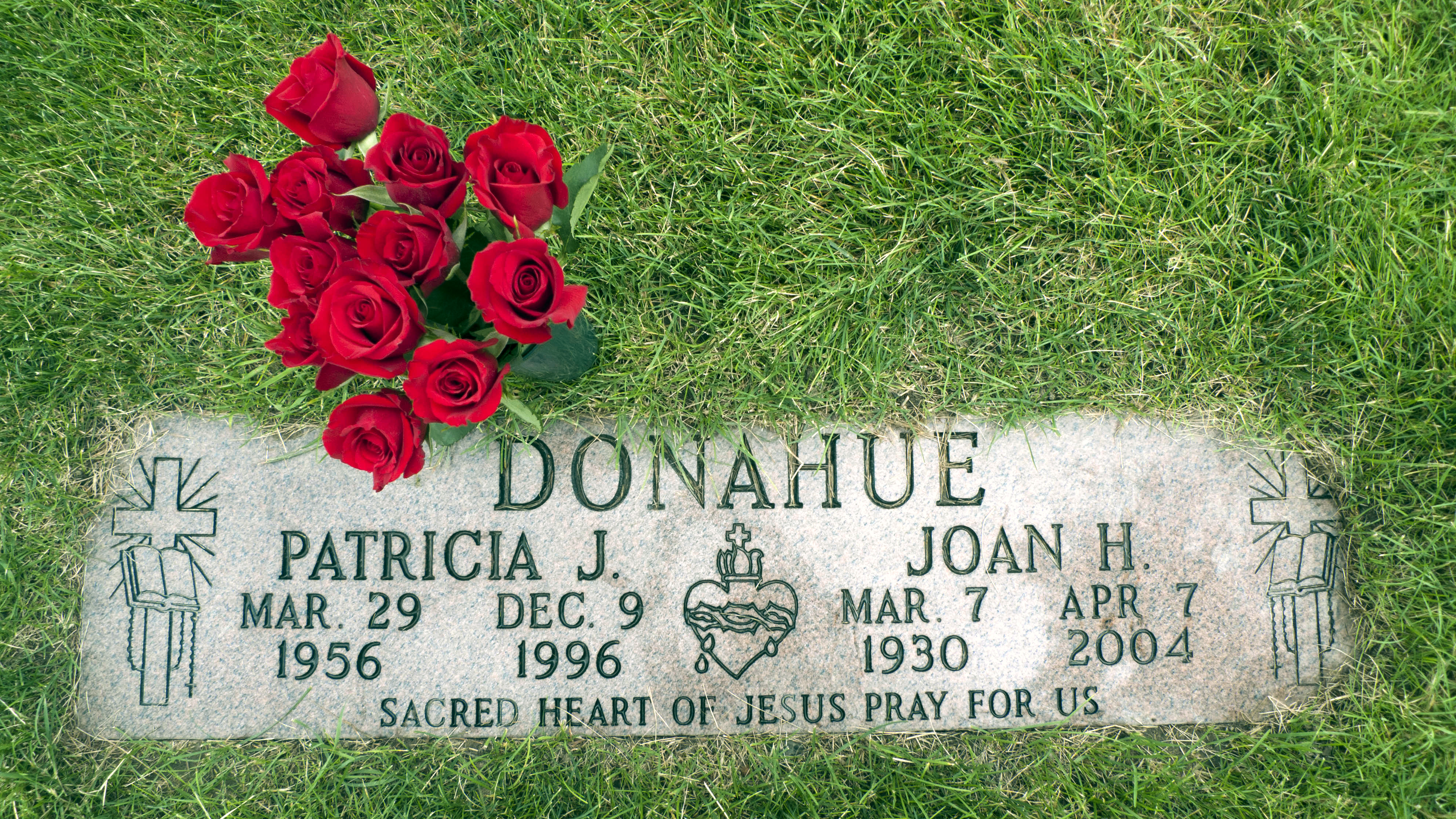
Grave of Patty Donahue and her mother Joan

On December 9, 1996, Donahue, who had been a heavy smoker most of her adult life, died of lung cancer in New York at the age of 40. She was interred in the Holy Cross Cemetery in Brook Park, a suburb of Cleveland.
