= Charlélie Couture =

French-American musician (born 1956)

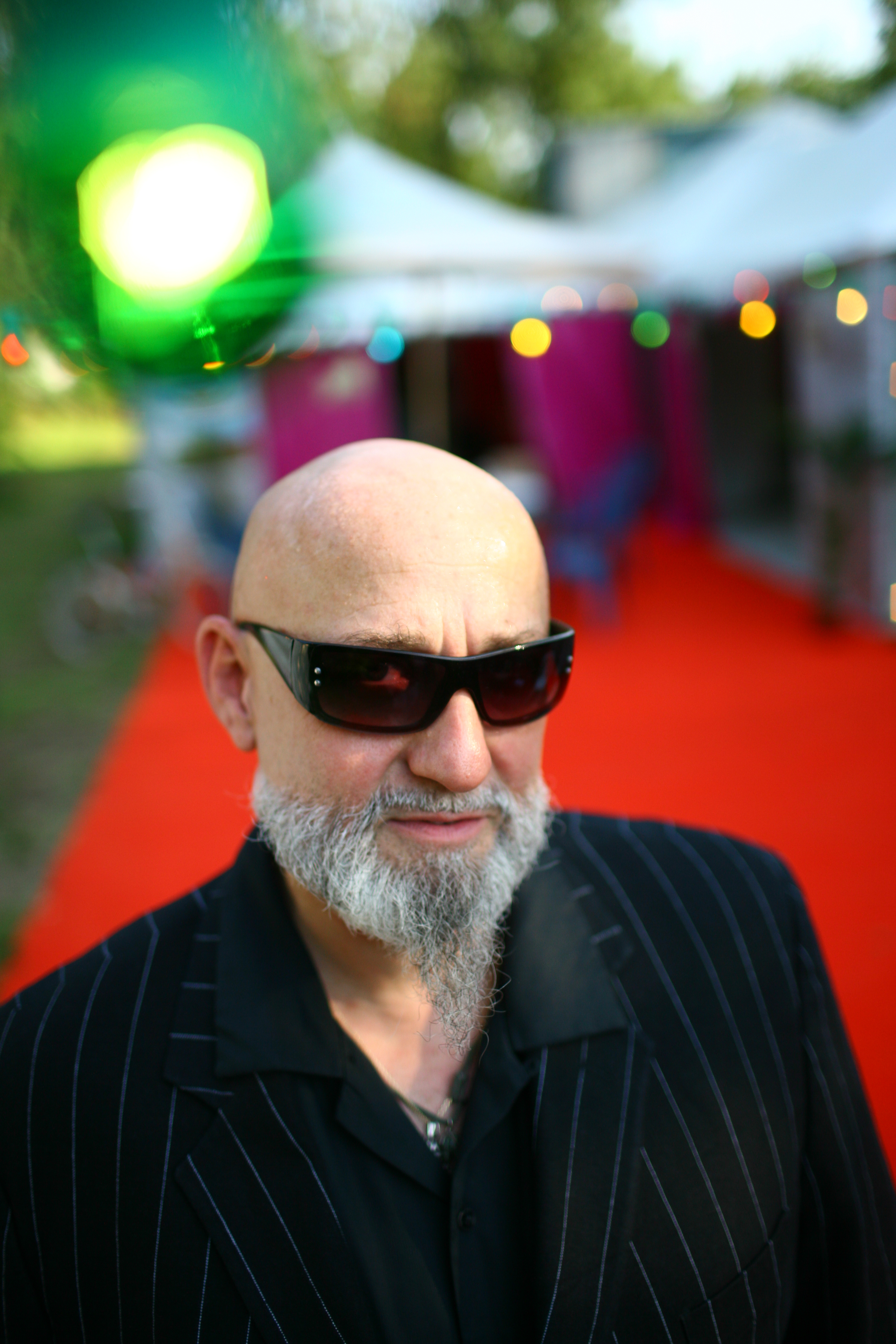

Background information
- Born: Bertrand Charles Elie Couture; 26 February 1956 (age 70); Nancy, France
- Website: http://www.charlelie.com/

Charlélie Couture (born Bertrand Charles Elie Couture; 26 February 1956) is a French and American musician and multi-disciplinary artist, who has recorded over 25 albums and 17 film soundtracks, and has held a number of exhibitions of paintings and photographs. He has also worked as a poster designer, and has published approximately 15 books of reflections, drawings and photographs.

== Life and career ==
He was born in Nancy, and graduated from l'École nationale supérieure des Beaux-Arts. He released his first album, 12 Chansons dans la Sciure ("12 Songs in the Sawdust") in 1978, followed by Le Pêcheur ("The Fisherman") in 1979 and Pochette surprise ("Lucky Dip") in 1981. He was then signed by Chris Blackwell to Island Records, becoming the first French artist on the label. He recorded the album Poèmes Rock in New York, and also contributed a track to the album A Christmas Record issued by ZE Records, an affiliate of the Island label. He had a hit single in France with the track Comme un Avion Sans Aile.

Also in 1981, he founded, in Nancy, the Local à Louer group of photographers, painters, poets, and stated in his "Art Rock manifesto" that "Art must make the junction between the functionalism of industrial society and the aspirations of pop culture". He also launched an art journal, Le Télégramme. In 1983, he wrote his first complete film soundtrack, for the movie Tchao Pantin ("So Long, Stooge"), for which he was nominated for a César Award. He held his first exhibition of drawings and watercolours in Paris in 1985, and continued to record and tour. In 1990–91 he visited Australia, recording two albums there, Melbourne Aussie and Victoria Spirit.

Later in the 1990s, his recordings were less successful and he concentrated more on photography, drawings and paintings. In 1997 he recorded a blues-influenced album, Casque Nu ("Naked Helmet"), in Chicago. In 1998, he was awarded the title of Officier du Mérite National. He worked extensively preparing posters and publicity for tennis tournaments, including the posters for the 2002 Davis Cup Final between France and Russia. In 2004, he settled for several years in New York, from where he released two albums, Double Vue (2004) and New Yor-Cœur (2006).

In April 2020 he announced that he had tested positive for COVID-19.

== Discography ==
Studio albums

- 1978: 12 chansons dans la sciure
- 1979: Le Pêcheur
- 1981: Pochette surprise
- 1981: Poèmes rock
- 1982: Quoi faire?
- 1983: Crocodile Point
- 1985: Art & Scalp
- 1987: Solo Boys
- 1988: Solo Girls
- 1990: Melbourne Aussie
- 1991: Victoria Spirit
- 1994: Les Naïves
- 1997: Casque nu
- 1999: Soudé soudés
- 2001: 109 (Poèmes électro)
- 2004: Double vue
- 2006: New YorCœur
- 2011: Fort rêveur
- 2014: I m M o r t e l
- 2016: Lafayette
- 2019: Même pas sommeil
- 2020: Trésors cachés et perles rares
- 2022: Quelques essentielles

Collaborative albums

- 1995: Dawn Town Project (with Mike Rimbaud)

Live albums

- 1989: 3 Folies Live (recorded at Folies Bergères during Solo Boys and Girls tour)
- 1993: Souvenirs Live (recorded during 1991/1992 tour)

Soundtracks

- 1983: Tchao Pantin
- 1989: La Salle de bain

Compilation albums

- 1990: Sides of Me
- 1991: Island Colors
- 1996: Patchworks

== Summary of Artistic Creations ==
- www.theregallery-nyc.com
- www.meetcharlelie.com

Education and conferences

- 1973 – Leaves home and goes on the road for a year
- 1974 – Graduates " Art Baccalauréat " from outside the high school system.
- 1979 – Graduates with honours from the Beaux-Arts DNSEP
- Jury for many conventions and festivals including the American film Deauville
- 2000 – Conference to the European Commission about Art and Culture
- 2004 – Conference " Conversations Essentielles " " " Faith %26 Culture " Paris
- 2007 – Beaubourg Art Pocket Film, 2006, Québec Festival 1998 etc...
- 2008 – Conference " Conventions Essentielles " Music and Creation, Paris
- 2011 – Conference " The Multism ", New York and Lecture " Discourse about The Multism ". La Sorbonne / Paris

Solo Exhibitions

- 1971: First painting and photo exhibit
- 1985: First exhibit in Paris, drawings and watercolors of "Chambres d'hotels", Galerie Du Jour/Agnès B
- 1989: Galerie " Halle Sud " of Geneva
- 1989: Exhibit Multimedia engravings/sculptures/paintings/musics/drawings/photos/texts
- 1991: Australian paintings and photopoems, Galerie Jean D'eve, Neuchatel (Switzerland)
- 1991: Galerie Atsuro Tayama (Paris) France
- 1993: "Chambres d'hôtels", drawings paintings, Galerie Nachbaur, Paris
- 1993: "Chambres d'hôtels" drawings, in Geneva, Galerie Papiers gras
- 1994: Galerie Ziggourat, Brussel (Belgium) "Chambres d'hotel"
- 1995: Galerie Gastaud, Clermont Ferrand France
- 1995: Avignon France Cloitre des Arts (Sculptures and drawings)
- 1997: Drawings and paintings et the Galerie Wable in Boulogne sur Mer
- 1997: Retrospective of "Chambres d'hotels Polaroids" Château Lumière, Lyon / France
- 1997: Fondation Nationale de la Photo, Lyon France (Photo-poems)
- 1998: Gallery Akka, rue de Seine, Paris, France
- 1999: Publicis / Champs Elysées (Tennis drawings)
- 1999: Museum of Erotism – Paris "X Positions" (photos, paintings)
- 2000: Gallery Wable, Lille and Boulogne sur Mer
- 2000: Lyon, Galerie Chomarat (paintings and drawings)
- 2000: Clermont Ferrand, Galerie Gastaud
- 2001: Galerie Capazza Nancay, inaugurates a new wing of his huge Gallery.
- 2002: Museum Le Corbusier – La Chaux de Fond (Switzerland)
- 2003: Gallery SOTO Brussels (Belgium)
- 2003: Gallery Ô, Pozzo Di Borgo Vevey (Switzerland)
- 2003: Laval Museum (France) Retrospective Exhibit on CharlElie's "L'art Total"
- 2004: Galerie Wable, Lille France
- 2004: Galerie Sparts, rue de Seine Paris
- 2004: Move to New York.
- 2004: Art Basel Miami – French Tuesday Art Night
- 2004: Gallery Art at Home, Soho, New York
- 2005: Opens his Art Studio in the Garment district
- 2005: "Living with Art", Soho, New York (USA)
- 2007: Galerie Ô, Vevey (Switzerland)" New York Shields %26 Paintings"
- 2007: "Re Construction", Galerie Mourlot, New York (USA)
- 2008: "Art Floor" Photos, Galerie Agnes Martel, Switzerland
- 2008: "Re Construction Paintings and Photos", Crid'Art, Amneville, France
- 2009: "Photos New York" "Mosaïque de Photo" La Collégiale Saint-André/Chartres Curated by Nadine Berthelier Directeur des Arts et du Patrimoine culturel et historique, Conservateur en Chef du Patrimoine
- 2009: "Shower Curtain and Photos" Maison Française/Washington
- 2009: "New York, Photo-Grafs", Galerie Beaudoin Lebon, Paris
- 2010: "New York on lines " Galery A.del, Lyon, Biennale de la photographie
- 2010: "Drawings and photografs " Galerie Antonio Nardonne, Brussels, Belgium
- 2011: Permanente exhibition, The Re Gallery, New York, USA
- 2011: Salon Balt'Art, Nogent sur Marne France
- 2011: AAA Galerie, Nogent sur Marne France
- 2011: "New York Be" Galerie W Paris France
- 2011: Salon d'Art contemporain Metz, A'del Gallery, Lyon France
- 2011: Salon d'Art contemporain Strasbourg, Galerie Nomade Monade France
- 2011: "Peintures et Photografs" Galerie Naclil, Lille France
- 2011: "Re-Construction" Dune Showroom, New York, USA
- 2012: CharlElie Black Art curated by Nomade monade- Lille Artfair
- 2012: Big Panel Photo-graff- Paris LCL
- 2012: Sept-installation "Manhattan" a project with 100 wood sculptures, France

Various

- 1982: Editor of the performing arts newspaper the Telegramme
- 1983: Nomination to the Cesar show for his soundtrack of Claude Berri film Tchao Pantin
- 1988: Actor and songwriter for the film "The Moderns" (USA) by Alan Rudolph
- 1993: Inauguration FNAC in Avignon, " Photos d'hotels ", traveling exhibit in France
- 1994: Conception and drawing of the new Logo for the Lorraine Region
- 1994: Creation of fans for the galerie La Pochade, Paris France
- 1995: Creation of CD ROM "Papers works", exhibit in Metz
- 1995: Creation a fresco for the opening of the FNAC in Nancy
- 1995: Bézier Museum exhibits a work on cardboard entitled "Knoxville USA"
- 1995: Designing the sets and costumes for the show "Concert Naïf au pays des Anges" at the Théâtre National de L'Odéon
- 2001: Participation in the creation of the "Livre de Roland Garros 2001" – set of photos of the greatest photographers – William Klein, texts by Patrice Dominguez and drawings by Charlelie
- 2003: Creation of poster for the Davis Cup Final (France-Russia)
- 2006–2009: Creates posters for FFT, and tennis tournaments
- 2010: Poster for "Le Palais Ideal du Facteur Cheval"

Group Exhibitions

- 1978: Salon des artistes indépendants Paris
- 1981–1986: Founder of an artists group called "Local a Louer" including painters, poets, graphic artists and photographers publishing of the " Manifeste de l'Art Rock " Numbers of exhibitions Paris, Tours Lille, Nancy
- 1997: Eurexpo show, Geneva, Switzerland
- 1999: Creates a watch-box for Swatch / Paris Place Vendôme
- 2000: International Art Market in Strasbourg
- 2003: "Sport Tools" for an Art Exhibition during the Olympic Games of Athens 2004
- 2006: "Crossings" at Living with Art NYC Soho. (With Thurman & Pascal)
- 2007: New York Art Floor with Peter Klasen (Photos) Metz (France)
- 2008: "Shower Curtains" ACMDM, centre d'Art Contemporain in Perpignan, France
- 2008: Temple Emmanu-El of Closter, Brooklyn
- 2009: Group show/FACEBOOK'S FRIENDS a virtual reality /Curator Michael Picoron
- 2010: "New York by" Galerie W, Paris devoted to L'Angelus, Barbizon, 100 artists salute Millet
- 2010: Street Artak street Art Festival, Angers
- 2010: Exhibitions, Art for a Better World, Miami, FL, Artbasel
- 2011: Exhibitions "Mail Art" drawings – SpArtS Gallery Paris

Publications

- 1984: Collection of drawings entitled " Cahiers d'Ecoles " reproduced on " alugraphie " paper though the art publisher, Voix R Meier
- 1989: "Solo Boys and Girls", a collection of songs texts with original photographs and drawings Seghers Editions
- 1989: "Les dragons en Sucre" Novel – Ramsay Pauvert Editions
- 1992: Book of photographs "Do not disturb", Marval Editions Plume
- 1992: Book of drawings "Jimmy Jacket" Art Editions, R Meier
- 1995: "25 images secondes" Illustrations for a novel by Hervé Eparvier, Serpent à Plume Editions
- 1995: Book of poetical reflections " Inventaire Paradoxal des petits plaisirs et de grandes haines " Stock Editions
- 1996: "Les Champs Paraboliques" on line. First version of the Web site CharlElie.com (Charlelie is one of the pioneer of the art web-site)
- 1998: "Filles de jour" Marval Éditions, Illustrations and texts in parallel with the photographs of Martial Lorcet
- 1998: "Le couloir des brumes", Novel Pré aux Clercs Editions
- 1999: "Transfocus" digital photographs accompanied by a CD Rom with original recordings FNAC Publishing
- 1999: "Beaux Gestes ", Tennis Drawings Pré aux Clercs Editions
- 2000: Creation of posters for Jean Pierre Cassel performance, and for various sports tournaments in ad abroad France (Tunisia)
- 2004: Artistic Travel notebook "En Australie", publisher Presse de la Renaissance
- 2009: Manhattan Photo-grafs Special Edition Book, L&N Editions
- 2009: "New York by CharlElie " Publisher Editions du Chêne, book, Photography
- 2011: "New York Be" Publisher Editions du Chêne, book, Photography
- 2012: " Et avant" (And Before) CharlElie (author), Serge Bloch (illustrator)

Selected articles and reviews

- "Les chemins parallèles", first book written by Alain Gilson about his multi-work. Published by Pierre-Marcel Favre –Switzerland 1988.

Selected catalogues

- 1992: "Australian Roadbook " Galerie J Lovera (France)
- 1993: "Chambres d'Hotel" Galerie Nachbaur, Paris France
- 2006: "Atelier Newyorcoeur ", Presse Litteraires, France
- 2007: "30 années de regard" Galerie Capazza, Nancay, France
- 2007: "Re Constructions" Galerie Moulot, New York, USA
- 2007: "New York" Ô Quai des Arts Galerie, Vevey Zwitzerland
- 2010: "Follow the Line" Publisher RentingArt, reflexion about CharlElie's art prospective

== Awards ==
- 1976: Second prize for Young Photojournalist from the city of Nancy.
- 1978: Quintard Prize from Academy Stanislas for the quality of his Art studies
- 1989: Academy Charles Cross Award
- 1998: Officier du Mérite National awarded by the Minister of the Cultural Affairs
- 1999: Lacoste Prize for the best drawings sports book of the year Beaux Gestes
- 2001: Roland Garros 2001 collection is awarded the Lacoste prize
- 2003: Chevalier de la Légion d'honneur, given by Mr Stephane Hessel
- 2010: Chevalier des Arts et lettres
