= Claudette Wells =

American actress and voice actress

Claudette Wells (born February 20, 1954, in St. Louis, Missouri) is an American actress and voice actress who is best known for her role as LaDonna Fredericks in Square Pegs. She is also known for her role as Peggy Harley on A Different World and her voice work in numerous movies including Shrek (2001) and Kill Bill: Volume 1 (2003).

== Career ==
Her best known role is as LaDonna Fredericks on Square Pegs (1982-83). She was the only black character in the cast. She became and stayed best friends in real life with co-star Tracy Nelson. They also played best friends on the show.

She also played Peggy Harley on A Different World (1988), Bindi in the Donna Mills TV movie False Arrest (1991), Maxine in the unaired CBS sitcom The Elvira Show (1993), and Ms. Tweesbury in Father's Day (1997).

She had roles in many television series including Father Dowling Investigates, The Steve Harvey Show, Melrose Place, Double Trouble, Not Necessarily the News, and Pursuit of Happiness.

As a voice actress, she worked on CBS Storybreak, the video game Transformers: The Game (2007), and many major movies including Mulan (1998), The Limey (1999), What Lies Beneath (2000), Wonder Boys (2000), Shark Tale (2004), The Chronicles of Riddick (2004), The Skeleton Key (2005), Barnyard (2006), Fantastic Four: Rise of the Silver Surfer (2007), Bride Wars (2009), The Princess and the Frog (2009), Brüno (2009) and Turbo (2013), among others.
