= Christmas Wrapping =

1981 Christmas song by the Waitresses

Single by the Waitresses

from the album A Christmas Record
- B-side: "Hangover 1/1/83"
- Released: 1981
- Recorded: 1981
- Studio: Electric Lady (New York City)
- Genre: Christmas; new wave; hip-hop
- Length: 5:18 (album version); 4:30 (single version); 4:21 (radio edit)
- Label: ZE
- Songwriter: Chris Butler
- Producer: Chris Butler

The Waitresses singles chronology
"I Know What Boys Like" (1980)	"Christmas Wrapping" (1981)	"I Know What Boys Like" (1982)

"Christmas Wrapping" is a Christmas song by the American new wave band the Waitresses. First released on ZE Records' 1981 compilation album A Christmas Record, it later appeared on the band's 1982 EP I Could Rule the World If I Could Only Get the Parts and numerous other holiday compilation albums. It was written and produced by Chris Butler, with vocals by Patty Donahue.

"Christmas Wrapping" received positive reviews and AllMusic described it as "one of the best holiday pop tunes ever recorded". It has been covered by more than a dozen acts, including the Spice Girls.

== Writing ==
In 1981, ZE Records asked each of its artists to record a Christmas song for a compilation album, A Christmas Record. The Waitresses were in the middle of a difficult tour and the Christmas song commission was "the last thing we wanted", Butler said later.

Butler wrote the song that August, assembling it from assorted unused riffs. He finished the lyrics in a taxi on the way to the recording studio, Electric Lady Studios in Greenwich Village. Butler said the lyrics came from his hatred of Christmas: "Everybody I knew in New York was running around like a bunch of fiends. It wasn't about joy. It was something to cope with." The bassist, Tracy Wormworth, was inspired by Bernard Edwards' bassline on the recently released "Good Times" by Chic.

Written while hip hop music was beginning to gain prominence, "Christmas Wrapping" is "almost rapped" by Donahue. Its title, a pun on "rapping", alludes to the 1979 song "Christmas Rappin'" by Kurtis Blow. Butler said he did not really think of Donahue's performance as a rap, as it was a new musical form, but said: "It was OK for a white guy to tell a story but tell it in rhythmic verse. And, it does have a melody, just three notes because Patty was no belter, but she’s a good enough actress that she could act it out." Butler said he also liked the meaning of "wraparound", as the story is circular.

== Lyrics ==
"Christmas Wrapping" is told from the perspective of a busy single woman who declines to participate in the exhausting Christmas season. On Christmas Eve, she seeks cranberries at a grocery store, where she encounters a man she has been interested in all year, bringing her Christmas "to a very happy ending". In the final refrain, she admits that she "couldn't miss this one this year".

== Release ==
"Christmas Wrapping" was released as a single in the UK in 1981 on Island Records. It did not initially make the charts, but was reissued in 1982 and reached No. 45 on the UK Singles Chart that December. It remains the Waitresses' highest-charting single in the UK, and despite its modest chart placing, the song was certified platinum by the BPI in 2024.

Butler said the reception was a rejuvenating gift for the band: "We do the Christmas song, forget about it and go back on the road. The next thing I know when calling back to New York is that it's all over the radio and much to our surprise it leaps over our heads and hits all the cities where we're heading and all of a sudden we're back on an upswing again."

== Legacy ==
In 2005, Guardian journalist Dorian Lynskey called the song "fizzing, funky dance-around-the-Christmas-tree music for Brooklyn hipsters". In 2012, the Daily Telegraph writer Bernadette McNulty called it "one of the most charming, insouciant festive songs ever". The AllMusic reviewer Andy Hinds called it "one of the best holiday pop tunes ever recorded".

During the 2016 Christmas season, the song re-entered the UK singles chart at number 96. It appears in numerous holiday-music compilations, including The Edge of Christmas, Dr. Demento's Holidays in Dementia, and Now That's What I Call Christmas!: The Signature Collection. Each festive season, Butler makes a donation to the Akron-Summit County children's library in the name of the first person to tell him they heard "Christmas Wrapping" on the radio.

In 2026, Olivia Rodrigo released “Take Me Home (4 Christmas),” an homage to “Christmas Wrapping.” She sent a preview of the song to Butler, who initially did not know who she was, but went on to praise her career and said he liked that she understood his songwriting.

== Covers ==
"Christmas Wrapping" was covered by the British pop group Spice Girls as a B-side for their 1998 single "Goodbye", with lyrics altered to include a reference to British supermarket chain Tesco instead of the American chain A&P. It has also been covered by Save Ferris (with lyrics altered for a Jewish perspective), Kate Nash, the Front Bottoms, Devon Kay & The Solutions, the Donnas, Summer Camp, the cast of the Broadway musical Wicked, comedian Doug Benson, Martha Wainwright, the cast of the TV show Glee (with Heather Morris on lead vocals), and Disney Channel star Bella Thorne. British/Irish girl band the Saturdays covered the song for the film Get Santa. Kylie Minogue recorded the song with Iggy Pop for her 2015 album, Kylie Christmas.

Sinkane, studying a Masters in composition, produced a cover for Christmas 2020. It featured Nancy Whang (LCD Soundsystem) singing lead, Nick Millhiser (Holy Ghost!) on drums, and Money Mark (The Beastie Boys) on Moog. Profits from this release went to The Food Bank for New York City. Haim released a parody cover “Christmas Wrapping 2020 (all I want for Christmas is a vaccine)” with lyrics by Jeremy O. Harris and production by Thundercat.

== Track listings and formats ==
- UK 7" Vinyl
1. "Christmas Wrapping" – 3:55
2. "Hangover 1/1/83" – 4:30
- UK 12" Vinyl
1. "Christmas Wrapping" (Long Version) – 5:23
2. "Hangover 1/1/83" – 4:30
- CD Single
1. "Christmas Wrapping" (Single Edit Version) – 4:30
2. "Christmas Wrapping" (Long Version) – 5:23
3. "Hangover 1/1/83" – 4:30

== Credits and personnel ==
Credits and personnel are adapted from "Christmas Wrapping" vinyl liner notes.

- Patty Donahue – vocals
- Tracy Wormworth – bass, vocals
- Billy Ficca – drums
- Dan Klayman – keys
- Chris Butler – guitars, producer
- Mars Williams – sax, horn arrangements
- Dave Buck – trumpet
- Mike Frondelli – engineering, mixing, coproducer

== Charts ==
Chart (1981–2020)	Peak position
UK Singles (Official Charts)	45
US Billboard Alternative Digital Songs Sales	9
US Billboard Rock Digital Songs	8
US Billboard Rock Streaming Songs	24
US Holiday 100 (Billboard)	67
US Holiday Digital Song Sales (Billboard)	12

== Certifications ==
Region	Certification	Certified units/sales
United Kingdom (BPI)	Platinum	600,000^{‡}
^{‡} Sales+streaming figures based on certification alone.
