= Amy Linker =

American actress (born 1966)

- Born: Amy Meredith Linker; Brooklyn, New York, U.S.
- Education: Wellesley College; University of Southern California
- Occupation: Actress

Amy Meredith Linker is an American actress. She is best known for her starring role in the television sitcom Square Pegs (1982–1983).

== Career ==
Born in Brooklyn, New York, Linker's first major acting role was as Kelly Lewis in the television series Lewis & Clark, which ran for one season from 1981 to 1982. Shortly thereafter, Linker was cast as central character Lauren Hutchinson on the teen comedy/drama Square Pegs. Square Pegs told the story of two high school freshmen, Hutchinson and Patty Greene (played by Sarah Jessica Parker), and their at times desperate attempts to fit in and achieve popularity. Linker was forced to wear fake braces and a fatsuit in order to appear less attractive than she actually was for the character she portrayed. Even though the show was praised by critics, it was cancelled after its first season.

After Square Pegs, Linker voiced the character of "Robin" on the animated Mister T series in 1983. After the show ended she enrolled in Wellesley College, graduating in 1989 with a degree in French studies. Other notable roles for Linker were as Sherie Lee Fox in the 1985 science fiction film D.A.R.Y.L., and as Jenny Pennoyer in the 1984 TV movie When We First Met. Linker appeared as the character Esmerelda on the television series Don't Make Me Sick in 2009.

== Personal life ==
Linker attended Beverly Hills High School in Beverly Hills, California, and Frenchwoods Festival of the Performing Arts camp. She worked in internet marketing and was also an elementary school teacher. In 2012, she obtained her Master of Social Work from the University of Southern California, and now works as a psychotherapist.

== Filmography ==
Film and Television
Year	Title	Role	Notes
1980	A Time for Miracles		Television film
1981–82	Lewis & Clark	Kelly Lewis	Main cast (13 episodes)
1982–83	Square Pegs	Lauren Hutchinson	Main cast (20 episodes)
1983–85	Mister T	Robin O'Neill (voice)	Main cast (30 episodes)
1983	Fantasy Island	Ellie Woods	Episode: "Saturday's Child/The Fantasy Island Girl"
1984	When We First Met	Jenny Pennoyer	Television film
1984	E/R	Cheryl	Episode: "All's Well That Ends"
1985	D.A.R.Y.L.	Sherie Lee Fox	Feature film
1999	Holy Hollywood	Rosy	Feature film
2009	Don't Make Me Sick	Psychic Esmerelda	Episode: "God is Not Board Certified"
2016	Child of the '70s	Detective Angie Hutchinson	2 episodes
