= Chi-Pig =

American new wave band

- Origin: Akron, Ohio, United States
- Genres: New wave
- Years active: 1977–1982
- Past members: Richard Roberts; Susan Schmidt; Deborah Smith

Chi-Pig was a new wave power trio hailing from Akron, Ohio that formed in 1977.

== History ==
=== Before Chi-Pig ===
During the 1960s and 1970s, Susan Schmidt (daughter of Marjorie H. Schmidt of The Co-eds) and Deborah Smith (later known as Deborah Smith-Cahan or Deborah Cahan) were active in several area bands, notably The Poor Girls, Cinderella's Revenge, and Friction. Smith and Schmidt formed The Poor Girls with Pam Johnson and Esta Kerr in 1965, while studying at Litchfield Junior High School, the first significant rock band to come from Akron and the first to consist only of women. They played regularly, were profiled by Jane Scott in The Plain Dealer, and opened for bands such as Cream and Steppenwolf. The group continued during their time at Firestone High School, until splitting up in 1969.

Schmidt and Smith played in numerous bands throughout the 1970s, including Cinderella's Revenge and Friction with Peter Laughner.

=== Chi-Pig ===
Around 1977, Schmidt and Smith teamed up with Richard Roberts to form Chi-Pig, taking their name from a local barbecue restaurant that sold both chicken and pork (whose sign featured a cartoon drawing of a pig with wings). The band was known for wearing flamboyant flamenco-style Latin-American outfits, even though this had nothing to do with their musical style. The band released a single, "Bountiful Living" b/w "Ring Around the Collar," with lyrics by Mark Mothersbaugh, of Devo, in 1978. Schmidt and Smith also co-wrote the song "Gates of Steel" from the 1980 Devo album Freedom of Choice with Mothersbaugh and Gerald Casale. Despite active participation in the local music scene and national interest in the Akron area due to the popularity of Devo and Tin Huey, Chi-Pig was unable to land a record deal, ultimately splitting up in 1981. During the fall of 1979, they recorded an album at Criteria Studios in Miami with Bruce Hensal. Although the album was not released at the time, in 2004 the band released a CD of the Criteria recordings along with their earlier recordings, including "Apu-Api (Help Me)" that appeared on the Stiff Records album The Akron Compilation. Their CD, Miami, was critically acclaimed as "25 years ahead of its time even now" by Richard Riegel in The Village Voice.

Chi-Pig's music was made up of smart pop rock songs addressing the concerns of women living in a consumerist society with just a touch of humor on the side. Musically, Schmidt and Smith had developed a tight sound over their many years of playing together. Unfortunately, the band fell apart just as other female led groups such as The Go-Go's and The Pretenders were breaking out.

In 2005, the band appeared in the PBS documentary, If You're Not Dead, Play, which detailed the Akron Sound that sprung out of the Ohioan punk rock and new wave scene in the second wave during the 1980s.

"Bountiful Living" was used in the soundtrack of the Klaus Nomi documentary film, The Nomi Song (2004).

=== Other work ===
Chi-Pig members Susan Schmidt and Deborah Smith co-wrote the Devo song "Gates of Steel" with Gerald Casale and Mark Mothersbaugh.

Smith went on to a career as a lawyer. Schmidt (now Susan Schmidt-Horning) earned a PhD in History at Case Western Reserve University and taught at the Cleveland Institute of Art and at Case before joining the department of history at St. John's University in Queens, New York. Schmidt-Horning has published numerous scholarly articles about music and technology, and her first book, Chasing Sound, was published by Johns Hopkins University Press.

== Members ==
- Richard Roberts - drums, vocals
- Susan Schmidt - guitar, keyboard, vocals
- Deborah Smith - bass, vocals

== Discography ==
=== Albums ===
- Miami (2004), Chi-Pig

=== Singles ===
- "Bountiful Living"/"Ring Around the Collar" (1978), Chi-Pig

=== Compilation appearances ===
- "Apu Api" on Akron Compilation (1978), Stiff
