= Billy Ficca =

American drummer (born 1950)

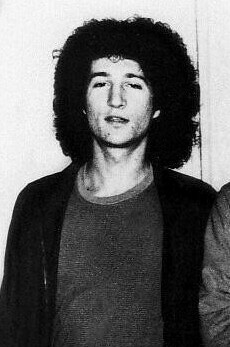
- Ficca in 1977

Background information
- Born: February 15, 1950 (age 76); Delaware, U.S
- Origin: New York City, U.S
- Genres: Punk rock; art punk; new wave; Jazz
- Occupation: Drummer

William Joseph Ficca (born February 15, 1950) is an American drummer who was a founding member of the rock groups Television and The Waitresses.

== Career ==
Of Italian origins, Ficca was a childhood friend of Tom Verlaine (aka Tom Miller). Verlaine moved to New York and in 1972 put together The Neon Boys with Richard Hell (Richard Meyers). They recruited Ficca to be their drummer and then, with the addition of second guitarist Richard Lloyd, changed their name to Television. After Television broke up, Ficca joined The Waitresses. Ficca also worked with Nona Hendryx & Zero Cool, 40 Families and The Washington Squares. He frequently performed with guitarist/vocalist Tom Verlaine and bassist Richard Hell as well as bassist Clint Bahr. He also played with the French poet and singer Sapho in 1980 on her LP called Sapho.

He has also been featured on albums by Dave Rave, Glen or Glenda, The Novellas, Eugene Ripper, Shane Faubert, Brian Ritchie and four albums with Antifolk founder Lach. He performed with Television, Gary Lucas, Dylan Nirvana and the Bad Flowers, Gods and Monsters, Mercury Mile, the New York Blues Project, the Original Dharma Bums and Uncle Bob NYC.
