= Tin Huey =

American rock band

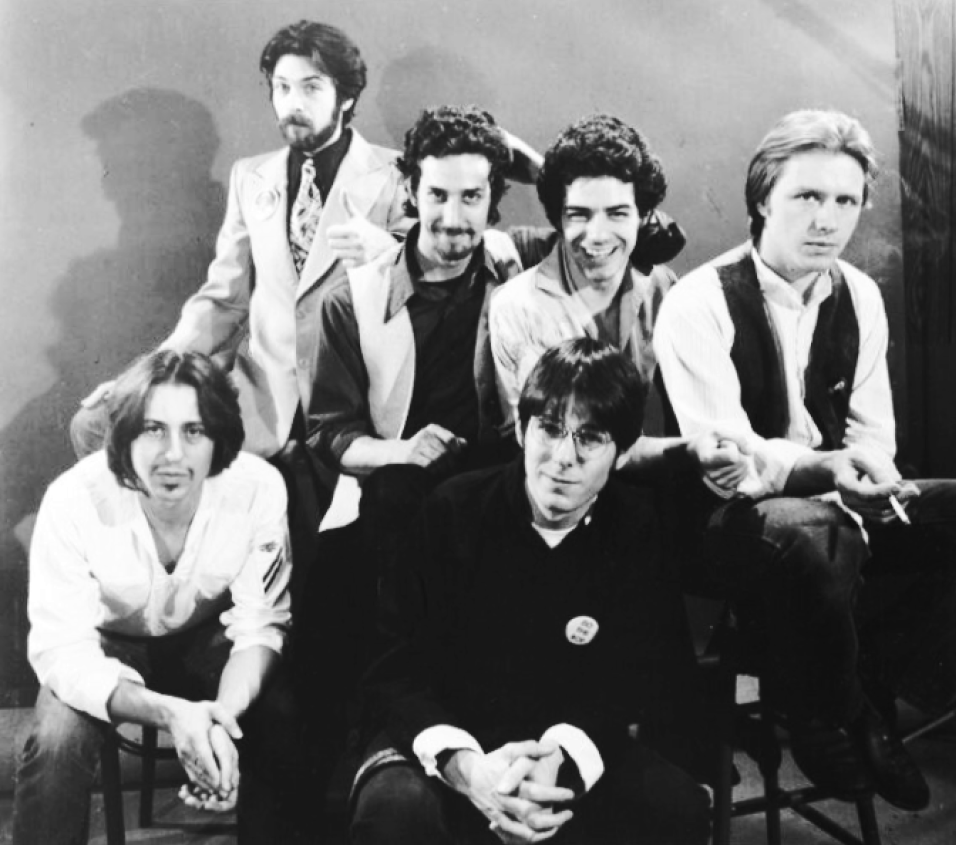
- Promotional picture for Contents Dislodged During Shipment, 1979; Left to right: Chris Butler, Harvey Gold, Michael Aylward, Ralph Carney, Mark Price, Stuart Austin

Background information
- Origin: Akron, Ohio, United States
- Genres: Post-punk; Progressive rock; New wave; Experimental rock
- Years active: 1972–1983; 1999–2011
- Label: Warner Bros.
- Past members: Michael Aylward (guitar, vocals); Stuart Austin (drums, percussion); Ralph Carney (horns); Chris Butler (guitar, vocals); Mark Price (bass, vocals); Harvey Gold (guitars, keyboards, vocals)
- Website: www.tinhuey.com

Tin Huey is an American experimental rock and new wave band from Akron, Ohio, United States, that formed in 1972 and disbanded in 1982.

== History ==
=== Original lineups ===
Initially named Rags, the band started with Mark Price (then known as Wesley the Stash) on guitar, Michael Aylward on bass, and Stuart Austin (then known as Napoleon Lemens) on drums. The band renamed themselves after Aylward's younger brother.

Harvey Gold became the fourth member to join on organ. Price left the band, and the remaining members switched to acoustic music before hiring electric guitarist Arthur Baranoff and bassist Wayne Swickley.

When the latter two left, Price rejoined as the bassist, while Aylward took on electric guitar, and Gold alternated between electric guitar and keyboards; they briefly added saxophonist Lochi MacIntosh to the lineup before replacing him with Ralph Carney. Chris Butler (the bassist for 15-60-75 (The Numbers Band)) was the last to join, also on guitar.

Inspired by Captain Beefheart, Frank Zappa, The Stooges and the Soft Machine, Tin Huey was among the bands that emerged from the Akron/Cleveland music scene, including Devo, Pere Ubu, Chi-Pig, the Electric Eels, the Bizarros, and the Rubber City Rebels.

=== Career ===
Tin Huey signed with Warner Bros. Records and recorded and released their debut album Contents Dislodged During Shipment in 1979. (The album was issued for the first time on CD by Collector's Choice Music in 2003.) It was not a commercial success.

Ralph Legnini (a.k.a. Ralph E.) played with the band for several early '80s shows before they went their separate ways. It would be two decades before they released any new material.

Their follow-up second album, Disinformation, was released in 1999 by Butler's Future Fossil Records. Since then, they have played shows both in Ohio and in the greater New York City area. Most recently, they assembled recordings from the mid-70s for their third album, Before Obscurity: The Bushflow Tapes. The album is a combination of studio recordings and live performances from JB's in Kent, Ohio, where they regularly played.

In 2003, Tin Huey were among the Midwestern/Akronite bands that were featured in the PBS documentary It's Everything, And Then It's Gone, which covered the mostly overlooked stories about the bands who hailed from the Ohio music scene and developed the "Akron Sound". That same year, Tin Huey played at the Rock and Roll Hall of Fame in Cleveland.

Tin Huey briefly became a septet after adding newcomer Bob Ethington, formerly of Unit 5.

Price died after a four-year battle with colon cancer on 6 November 2008, at the age of 56. Tin Huey stopped performing as a band. A spin-off band, Half Cleveland, was formed in 2007 featuring Gold, Butler, Ethington, and former Chi-Pig bassist Debbie Smith. They have played occasional shows in the Akron/Cleveland area, including opening a show at the Akron Civic Theater for Chrissie Hynde of the Pretenders. Since Price's death, there have been a couple of live events, one a jam loosely dedicated to Price involving all the surviving members of the Hueys, bass handled by Gold, Smith, and Kristoffer Carter (The KC Show). The second was an Arts Program benefit billed as "A Gaggle of Hueys and a Houseguest" featuring original Hueys Gold, Aylward, and Austin, along with Dave Rich of Houseguest. Recently, Gold and Aylward have also been playing improvisational guitar duets at local art galleries.

== Current line-up of Tin Huey ==
- Michael Aylward (Guitar, Vocals)
- Stuart Austin (Drums, Percussion)
- Chris Butler (Guitar, Vocals)
- Harvey Gold (Keyboards, Bass, Guitar, Vocals)
- "Bongo" Bob Ethington

== Former members of the Rags/Tin Huey ==
- Arthur Baranoff (Electric Guitar)
- Wayne Swickley (Bass)
- Lochi MacIntosh (Horns)
- Ralph Legnini (Guitar)
- Mark Price (Bass, Vocals) (deceased)
- Ralph Carney (Horns) (deceased)

== Discography ==
- Tin Huey (EP) (1977) (Clone Records)
- Breakfast with the Hueys (EP) (1978) (Clone Records)
- Contents Dislodged During Shipment (1979) (Warner Bros. Records)
- English Kids (1980) EP (Clone Records)
- Disinformation (1999) (Future Fossil Records)
- Sneak Peak: The Obscurity Series (2004) (Tin Huey Music)
- Before Obscurity: The Bushflow Tapes (2009) (Smog Veil Records)

== See also ==
- List of new wave artists
