= List of songs with lyrics by Gerry Goffin =

This is a list of songs co-written by Gerry Goffin. Goffin (1939–2014) was an American lyricist, who formed a successful songwriting partnership with his wife, Carole King. Their first success was "Will You Love Me Tomorrow", recorded by the Shirelles and a hit in 1961. Goffin later wrote lyrics for songs with several other composers, most notably Michael Masser.

== Hits, charted songs and notable album tracks by Goffin and King ==
Year	Song	Original artist	^{U.S. Hot 100}	^{UK Singles Chart}	Other versions, chart information (US unless otherwise stated) and album notes
1961	"Will You Love Me Tomorrow"	The Shirelles	1	4	Carole King (in 1971), The Four Seasons (in 1968, #24), Tony Orlando (1961), Cher, Roberta Flack, Amy Winehouse, Melanie (UK #37, 1974), Jackie DeShannon, Len Barry, Bunny Sigler, Cissy Houston, The Platters, Neil Diamond (in 1993), Bryan Ferry (UK #23, 1993), Linda Ronstadt, Michael Stanley Band, Angus Tung (in Mandarin), Shirley Kwan and Alan Tam (in Cantonese), Dusty Springfield, Dave Mason and Debbie Gibson (both under the title "Will You Still Love Me Tomorrow"), The Rocky Fellers, Lorrie Morgan, and Minnie Driver (performed in the film Beautiful), Françoise Hardy.
1961	"How Many Tears"	Bobby Vee	63	10	
1961	"Take Good Care of My Baby"	Bobby Vee	1	3	Dion and the Belmonts (later in 1961), The Beatles (in 1962 for Decca auditions), Bobby Vinton (in 1968), Smokie (UK #34, 1981), Bobby Vee, Stephen Collins, Dick Brave
1961	"Some Kind of Wonderful"	The Drifters	32	-	Tony Orlando - 1961. In album Bless You and Eleven other Great Hits, Epic LN 3808. Marvin Gaye (in 1968), Carole King (in 1971); not the same song as the Grand Funk Railroad hit
1961	"Halfway to Paradise"	Tony Orlando	39	-	Billy Fury (UK #3, 1961), Bobby Vinton (1968), Tina Charles (1977), Dobby Dobson's reggae version recorded in the 1970s
1961	"Every Breath I Take"	Gene Pitney	42	-	No relation to the Police's "Every Breath You Take"
1961	"I'd Never Find Another You"	Tony Orlando	-	-	In album Bless You and Eleven other Great Hits, Epic LN 3808, 1961. Billy Fury (UK #5, 1961), Paul Anka (US #106, 1962)
1961	"What A Sweet Thing That Was"	The Shirelles	54	-	
1961	"Happy Times (Are Here To Stay)"	Tony Orlando	82	-	
1961	"Walkin' with My Angel"	Bobby Vee	53	-	Herman's Hermits
1961	"Don't Ever Change"	The Crickets	-	5	The Beatles (in 1963, unreleased until 1994), Brinsley Schwarz (1973), Bryan Ferry (in 1973), Mud (in 1982)
1961	"Dear Mr. D.J. Play It Again"	Tina Robin	95	-	Written by Goffin and King with Howard Greenfield
1962	"Why'd You Wanna Make Me Cry"	Connie Stevens	52	-	
1962	"He Knows I Love Him Too Much"	The Paris Sisters	34	-	
1962	"I've Got Bonnie"	Bobby Rydell	18	-	
1962	"When My Little Girl Is Smiling"	The Drifters	28	31	Steve Alaimo #72 in 1971 Hot 100, Craig Douglas (UK #9), Jimmy Justice (UK #9)
1962	"I Can't Say Goodbye"	Bobby Vee	92	-	
1962	"Her Royal Majesty"	James Darren	6	36	
1962	"Chains"	The Cookies	17	50	The Everly Brothers (recorded in 1962, released 1984), The Beatles (in 1963), Carole King (in 1980), The Del Monas (in 1984)
1962	"Sharing You"	Bobby Vee	15	10	
1962	"Keep Your Hands off My Baby"	Little Eva	12	30	The Beatles (in 1964, unreleased until 1994), Wayne Fontana & the Mindbenders (1964), The Gore Gore Girls (in 2002), Kirsty MacColl (1981)
1962	"Keep Your Love Locked (Deep In Your Heart)"	Paul Petersen	58	-	Russ Sainty
1962	"The Loco-Motion"	Little Eva	1	2; 11 (1972)	The Vernons Girls (UK #47, 1962), The Chiffons (in 1963), Emerson Lake & Powell (instrumental), Grand Funk Railroad (in 1974, #1), Carole King (in 1980), Dave Stewart with Barbara Gaskin (UK #70, 1986), Kylie Minogue (in 1988, #3, UK #2), Tina Turner, Dwight Yoakam. Originally published as "Loco Motion".
1962	"He Hit Me (It Felt Like a Kiss)"	The Crystals	-	-	The Motels (in 1982), Hole (in 1994), Grizzly Bear (in 2007)
1962	"Go Away Little Girl"	Steve Lawrence	1	-	Mark Wynter (UK #6, 1962), The Tams, Donny Osmond (in 1971, #1), The Happenings (in 1966, #12)
1962	"Point Of No Return"	Gene McDaniels	21	-	
1962	"It Might As Well Rain Until September"	Carole King	22	3	Bobby Vee, Helen Shapiro
1962	"Up on the Roof"	The Drifters	5	-	Kenny Lynch (UK #10, 1962), Julie Grant (UK #33, 1963), Carole King (in 1970), Laura Nyro (in 1970), Tony Orlando and Dawn (1970) in album Candida, James Taylor (in 1979, #28), Neil Diamond (in 1993), Robson and Jerome (UK #1, 1995), Billy Joe Royal, Peter Cincotti
1963	"Don't Say Nothin' Bad (About My Baby)"	The Cookies	7	-	
1963	"Old Smokey Locomotion"	Little Eva	48	-	
1963	"Let's Turkey Trot"	Little Eva	20	-	
1963	"He's A Bad Boy"	Carole King	94	-	
1963	"This Little Girl"	Dion	21	-	
1963	"Poor Little Rich Girl"	Steve Lawrence	27	-	
1963	"I Can't Stay Mad at You"	Skeeter Davis	7	-	
1963	"Will Power"	The Cookies	72	-	
1963	"Hey Girl"	Freddie Scott	10	-	Duffy Power (1963), Donny Osmond (in 1972, #9), George Benson (1977), Carole King (in 1980), Billy Joel (Greatest Hits Volume III in 1997), Bob James & David Sanborn, Ray Charles & Michael McDonald (duet, from Charles' album Genius Loves Company), Bobby Vee (as part of a medley with The Temptations' hit "My Girl" in 1968, #35), The Righteous Brothers (1966, on their album Soul & Inspiration)
1963	"I Want To Stay Here"	Steve and Eydie	28	3	Miki & Griff (UK #23, 1963), Cristóbal Briceño (duet with Natalia Molina, 2020)
1963	"One Fine Day"	The Chiffons	5	29	The Carpenters (in 1973), Rita Coolidge (in 1979, #66), Carole King (in 1980, #12), Aaron Neville (in 1993), Natalie Merchant (in 1996)
1963	"Walking Proud"	Steve Lawrence	26	-	
1963	"Everybody Go Home"	Eydie Gormé	80	-	
1963	"I Can't Stop Talking About You"	Steve and Eydie	35	-	
1964	"I Can't Hear You No More"	Betty Everett	66	-	Dusty Springfield (in 1965), King (in 1970), Helen Reddy (in 1976, #29)
1964	"I'm into Something Good"	Earl-Jean	38	-	Herman's Hermits (later in 1964, #13, UK #1)
1964	"He's in Town"	The Tokens	43	-	The Rockin' Berries (UK #3)
1964	"Where Does Love Go"	Freddie Scott	82	-	
1964	"I Just Can't Say Goodbye"	Bobby Rydell	94	-	
1964	"Oh No Not My Baby"	Maxine Brown	24	-	The Shirelles (original recording, not released until later), Manfred Mann (UK #11, 1965), Dusty Springfield (in 1965), Aretha Franklin (in 1970), Rod Stewart (#59, UK #6, 1973), The Partridge Family (Bulletin Board in 1973), Merry Clayton (US #72) in 1973, King (in 1980 and 2001), Cher (in 1992, #33 in the U.K.), Linda Ronstadt (in 1994)
1964	"Show Me Girl"	Herman's Hermits	-	19	
1965	"At The Club"	The Drifters	43	35	
1965	"Just Once in My Life"	The Righteous Brothers	9	-	Written by Goffin and King with Phil Spector
1965	"Hung on You"	The Righteous Brothers	47	-	Written by Goffin and King with Phil Spector
1965	"Is This What I Get For Loving You"	The Ronettes	-	-	Written by Goffin and King with Phil Spector. Marianne Faithfull (UK #43, 1967)
1965	"Some of Your Lovin'"	Dusty Springfield	-	8	Phil Collins (in 2010)
1965	"It's Gonna Be Alright"	Maxine Brown	56	-	
1965	"I Need You"	Chuck Jackson	75	-	The Walker Brothers (UK #1 EP, 1966)
1965	"Don't Forget About Me"	Barbara Lewis	91	-	Dusty Springfield (US #64)
1966	"Don't Bring Me Down"	The Animals	12	6	Tom Petty and the Heartbreakers (in 1986)
1966	"I Happen to Love You"	The Myddle Class	-	-	The Electric Prunes on the 1967 album Underground
1966	"Road to Nowhere"	Carole King	-	-	(No relation to the Talking Heads song) White Trash (1969)
1966	"So Much Love"	Ben E. King	96	-	Steve Alaimo (#92, 1966)
1966	"Take a Giant Step"	The Monkees	-	-	From the 1966 US/UK #1 LP The Monkees, plus Taj Mahal (1969)
1966	"Sweet Young Thing"	The Monkees	-	-	Written by Goffin and King with Michael Nesmith. From the LP The Monkees
1966	"Sometime in the Morning"	The Monkees	-	-	From the 1967 US/UK #1 LP More of The Monkees
1966	"Goin' Back"	Dusty Springfield	-	10	Goldie (recorded in 1966 but unreleased), The Byrds (in 1968, #89), King (in 1970 and in 1980), Larry Lurex (1973) Nils Lofgren, Elkie Brooks, Johnny Logan, Diana Ross, Glen Shorrock & Renee Geyer (Aust. 1983), Phil Collins (2010)
1966	"I Can't Make It Alone"	P.J. Proby	-	37	Dusty Springfield, Maria McKee (UK #74, 1993)
1966	"Yours Until Tomorrow"	Dee Dee Warwick	-	-	Gene Pitney (UK #34, 1968)
1966	"On This Side of Goodbye"	The Righteous Brothers	47	-	
1967	"Pleasant Valley Sunday"	The Monkees	3	11	The Weisstronauts (in 2008)
1967	"Star Collector"	The Monkees	-	-	From the 1967 US #1 LP Pisces, Aquarius, Capricorn & Jones Ltd.
1967	"(You Make Me Feel Like) A Natural Woman"	Aretha Franklin	8	-	King (in 1971), Laura Nyro (in 1971), Rod Stewart (in 1974), Bonnie Tyler (in 1978), Mary J. Blige (in 1995, #95), Celine Dion (in 1995)
1968	"Porpoise Song"	The Monkees	62	-	Bongwater (in 1988), The Wondermints (in 1996), Trouble (in 1996), The Church (in 1999)
1968	"I Can't Make It Alone"	Bill Medley	95	-	Lou Rawls #63 Hot 100 in 1969
1968	"I Wasn't Born to Follow"	The Byrds	-	-	The City (Now That Everything's Been Said in 1968) King (in 1980), Tracy Grammer (in 2004), Beth Orton (in 2012). Byrds' single released as "Wasn't Born to Follow".
1970	"That Old Sweet Roll (Hi-de-Ho)"	The City	-	-	Leslie Uggams, Blood, Sweat & Tears (as "Hi-De-Ho (That Old Sweet Roll)", #14), Dusty Springfield (non-LP B-side in 1969), King (in 1980).
1970	"Sweet Sweetheart"	Bobby Vee	88	-	
1971	"Smackwater Jack"	Carole King	14	-	Quincy Jones, The Manhattan Transfer, Buffy Sainte-Marie
1984	"Time Don't Run Out on Me"	Anne Murray	-	-	#2 on the Billboard Hot Country Singles chart

== Songs by Gerry Goffin with other songwriters ==
In addition to King, Goffin also collaborated with other songwriters, notably Barry Mann, Jack Keller, Russ Titelman, Wes Farrell, Barry Goldberg and Michael Masser.

Year	Song	Songwriters	Performer	U.S. Hot 100	UK Singles Chart	Cover versions and notes
1959	"Oh Neil"	Greenfield, Sedaka & Goffin	Carole King	-	-	
1960	"The Lovin' Touch"	Goffin & Keller	Mark Dinning	84	-	
1961	"Who Put the Bomp (in the Bomp, Bomp, Bomp)"	Goffin & Mann	Barry Mann	7	-	The Viscounts (UK #21, 1961), Showaddywaddy (UK #37, 1982)
1961	"I Could Have Loved You So Well"	Goffin & Mann	Ray Peterson	57	-	Produced by Phil Spector
1961	"Run to Him"	Goffin & Keller	Bobby Vee	2	3	Donny Osmond (in 1972)
1962	"A Forever Kind of Love"	Goffin & Keller	Bobby Vee	-	13	Cliff Richard
1962	"How Can I Meet Her?"	Goffin & Keller	The Everly Brothers	75	12	
1962	"It Started All Over Again"	Goffin & Keller	Brenda Lee	29	15	
1962	"Don't Ask Me to Be Friends"	Goffin & Keller	The Everly Brothers	48	-	
1963	"Let's Turkey Trot"	Goffin & Keller	Little Eva	20	13	Note: Early copies credit the song incorrectly to Goffin and King, rather than Goffin and Keller. The writing credit was later changed to add George Goldner and Herbie Cox, who had written the melodically similar "Little Girl of Mine" for The Cleftones in 1956.
1963	"Don't Try To Fight It, Baby"	Goffin & Keller	Eydie Gormé	53	-	
1963	"Girls Grow Up Faster Than Boys"	Goffin & Keller	The Cookies	33	-	
1965	"Yes I Will"	Goffin & Titelman	The Hollies	-	9	The Monkees (as "I'll Be True To You" in 1966)
1971	"I'll Meet You Halfway"	Goffin & Farrell	The Partridge Family	9	-	
1973	"I've Got to Use My Imagination"	Goffin & Goldberg	Gladys Knight & the Pips	4	-	
1975	"It's Not the Spotlight"	Goffin & Goldberg	Rod Stewart	-	-	Beth Orton (in 1996)
1975	"Theme from Mahogany (Do You Know Where You're Going To)"	Goffin & Masser	Diana Ross	1	5	
1976	"So Sad The Song"	Goffin & Masser	Gladys Knight & The Pips	47	20	
1978	"Saving All My Love for You"	Goffin & Masser	Marilyn McCoo and Billy Davis Jr.	-	-	Whitney Houston (US #1 in 1985, UK #1 in 1985)
1980	"Someone That I Used to Love"	Goffin & Masser	Natalie Cole	21	-	
1983	"Tonight, I Celebrate My Love"	Goffin & Masser	Roberta Flack & Peabo Bryson	16	2	
1984	"Nothing's Gonna Change My Love for You"	Goffin & Masser	George Benson	-	-	Glenn Medeiros (US #12 in 1987, UK #1 in 1988)
1985	"A Long and Lasting Love"	Goffin & Masser	Crystal Gayle	-	-	#5 Country. Covered by Glenn Medeiros, Billy Preston, Jane Olivor, and Syreeta
1989	"Miss You Like Crazy"	Goffin, Masser and Glass	Natalie Cole	7	2	
1994	"No More Blue Christmas'"	Goffin, Masser	Natalie Cole	-	-	
