= The Cookies =

1950s/60s American R&B group

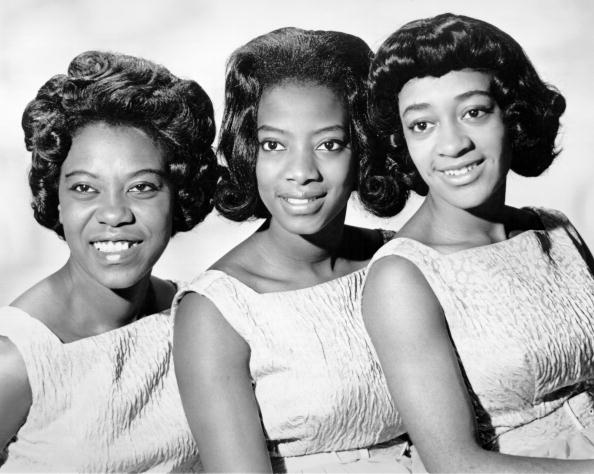
- The Cookies' 1962 lineup. From left: Dorothy Jones, Earl-Jean McCrea, and Margaret Ross.

Background information
- Origin: Brooklyn, New York City, New York, United States
- Genres: R&B, pop, soul
- Years active: 1954–1958; 1962–1967
- Labels: Lamp/Aladdin; Atlantic; Dimension
- Spinoffs: The Raelettes
- Past members: Darlene McCrea; Margie Hendricks; Earl-Jean McCrea; Dorothy Jones; Beulah Robertson; Margaret Ross

The Cookies were an American R&B girl group active in two distinct lineups, the first from 1954 to 1958 which later became the Raelettes, and the second from 1961 to 1967. Several of the members of both lineups were members of the same family. Both lineups were most prominent as session singers and backing vocalists.

== History ==
Formed in 1954 in Brooklyn, New York, United States, The Cookies originally consisted of Dorothy Jones, Darlene McCrea and Dorothy's cousin, Beulah Robertson. In 1956, Robertson was replaced by Margie Hendrix. The group was introduced to Ray Charles through their session work for Atlantic Records. In 1958, the Cookies performed with Ray Charles and Ann Fisher for the Cavalcade of Jazz concert produced by Leon Hefflin Sr., held at the Shrine Auditorium in Los Angeles on August 3. The other headliners were Little Willie John, Sam Cooke, Ernie Freeman, and Bo Rhambo. Sammy Davis Jr. was there to crown the winner of the Miss Cavalcade of Jazz beauty contest. After backing Charles and other Atlantic Records artists, McCrea and Hendricks helped form the Raelettes in 1958.

=== Second lineup ===
In 1961, a new version of the Cookies emerged in New York, with Dorothy Jones joining newcomers Earl-Jean McCrea (Darlene's younger sister) and another of Dorothy's cousins, Margaret Ross. Jones also recorded one solo recording for Columbia in 1961. This trio had the greatest success as the Cookies: under their own name; as backing vocals for other artists, including Neil Sedaka's hit songs "Breaking Up Is Hard to Do", "The Dreamer" and "Bad Girl"; and recording demos for Aldon Music, under the direction of Carole King and Gerry Goffin. They provided the backup vocals for the Little Eva hit song, "The Loco-Motion", as well as her follow-up hit "Let's Turkey Trot", both from 1962; and for Mel Tormé's hit version of "Comin' Home Baby". They scored their biggest hit in 1963 with the song "Don't Say Nothin' Bad (About My Baby)", which reached number 3 on the Billboard R&B chart and number 7 on the Billboard Billboard Hot 100.

A 1962 hit, "Chains", was recorded by the Beatles on their debut release Please Please Me. Earl-Jean McCrea left the group in 1965 after two solo singles, which included the first recording of the Goffin/King song "I'm Into Something Good", made famous by Herman's Hermits.

The Cookies also released several recordings under other names, mostly with Margaret Ross on lead vocals. Their alternative names on recordings were the Palisades (Chairman), the Stepping Stones (Philips), the Cinderellas (Dimension) and the Honey Bees (Fontana 1939 only); record labels are given in brackets.

In April 1967, they released their last record, produced by the Tokens. Darlene McCrea returned to replace her sister for this recording.

Margie Hendrix died on July 14, 1973, at the age of 38.

Dorothy Jones died in Columbus, Ohio, from complications of Alzheimer's disease on December 25, 2010, at the age of 76.

Darlene McCrea died from cancer on February 4, 2013, at the age of 76.

Margaret Ross Williams continued to tour as The Cookies with back-up singers. She also occasionally performed with Barbara Harris and the Toys. Ross Williams died on January 23, 2026, at the age of 83.

Earl-Jean McCrea died on May 7, 2026, at the age of 83.

== Members ==
=== Personnel ===
- Dorothy Jones – 1954–1958, 1961–1967
- "Ethel" Darlene McCrea – 1954–1958, 1964–1967
- Beulah Robertson – 1954–1956
- Margie Hendricks – 1956–1958
- Earl-Jean McCrea – 1961–1964
- Margaret Ross – 1961–1967

Dorothy, Beulah, and Margaret were first cousins; their mothers were sisters. Beulah and Margaret were not members of the group during the same period, but both performed with Dorothy. Darlene and Earl-Jean were sisters, but were not members of the group during the same period.

== Discography ==
=== Singles ===
Year	Title	Peak chart positions		Record Label	B-side
Year	Title	US Pop	US R&B	Record Label	B-side
1954	"Don't Let Go"	—	—	Lamp	"All Night Mambo"
1955	"Precious Love"	—	—	Atlantic	"Later Later"
1956	"In Paradise"	—	9	Atlantic	"Passing Time"
1956	"My Lover"	—	—	Atlantic	"Down by the River"
1957	"Hippy-Dippy-Daddy"	—	—	Josie	"King of Hearts"
1962	"Chains"	17	6	Dimension	"Stranger in My Arms"
1963	"Don't Say Nothin' Bad (About My Baby)"	7	3	Dimension	"Softly in the Night"
1963	"Will Power"	72	—	Dimension	"I Want a Boy for My Birthday"
1963	"Girls Grow Up Faster Than Boys"	33	18	Dimension	"Only to Other People"
1964	"I Never Dreamed"	—	—	Dimension	"The Old Crowd"
1967	"Wounded"	—	—	Warner Bros.	"All My Trials"

== Discography as backup singers ==
- "Drown In My Own Tears" – Ray Charles, 1955
- "Corrine, Corrina" – Big Joe Turner, 1956
- "It’s Too Late" – Chuck Willis, 1956
- "Lonely Avenue" – Ray Charles, 1956
- "Halfway to Paradise" – Tony Orlando, 1961
- "Bless You" – Tony Orlando, 1961
- "Happy Birthday Sweet Sixteen" – Neil Sedaka, 1961
- "The Loco-Motion" – Little Eva, 1962
- "Breaking Up is Hard to Do" – Neil Sedaka, 1962
- "Keep Your Hands Off My Baby" – Little Eva, 1962
- "Comin' Home Baby" – Mel Torme, 1962
- "Next Door to an Angel" – Neil Sedaka, 1962
- "Blame It on the Bossa Nova" – Eydie Gorme, 1963
- "Don't Try to Fight It, Baby" – Eydie Gorme, 1963
- "I Want to Stay Here" – Steve and Eydie, 1963
- "Let's Turkey Trot" – Little Eva, 1963
- "Swinging on a Star" – Big Dee Irwin and Little Eva, 1963
- "Happy Being Fat" – Big Dee Irwin, 1963
- "You're My Inspiration" – Big Dee Irwin, 1963
- "Hey Girl" – Freddie Scott, 1963
- "Bad Girl" – Neil Sedaka, 1963
- "The Christmas Song" – Big Dee Irwin and Little Eva, 1963
- "The Shadow of Your Love" – The Blue Eyed Soul featuring Billy Vera, 1966

== Bibliography ==
- Clemente, John (2000). Girl Groups -- Fabulous Females That Rocked The World. Iola, Wisconsin, Krause Publications. p. 276. ISBN 0-87341-816-6.
- Clemente, John (2013). Girl Groups -- Fabulous Females Who Rocked The World. Bloomington, Indiana, Authorhouse Publications. p. 623. ISBN 978-1-4772-7633-4
