= Chains (Cookies song) =

1962 single by the Cookies

Single by the Cookies
- B-side: "Stranger in My Arms"
- Released: November 1962
- Recorded: 1962
- Genre: R&B, pop
- Length: 2:29
- Label: Dimension
- Songwriters: Gerry Goffin, Carole King
- Producer: Gerry Goffin

The Cookies singles chronology
"In Paradise (reissue)" (1960)	"Chains" (1962)	"Don't Say Nothin' Bad (About My Baby)" (1963)

"Chains" is a rhythm and blues song written by husband-and-wife songwriting team Gerry Goffin and Carole King. It was a hit for the American girl group the Cookies in 1962 and for the English rock band the Beatles, who recorded the song for their debut album in 1963. King recorded a solo version of "Chains" for her 1980 album Pearls: Songs of Goffin and King.

The song used in the opening sequence of film Skipped Parts.

== The Cookies rendition ==
The song was originally offered to The Everly Brothers who recorded their version in July 1962, but opted not to release it. This recording would remain unreleased until 1984, when it was included in the UK compilation Album Nice Guys. The Cookies, who also worked as backing singers, recorded "Chains" and in late 1962, it became their first appearance in the record charts since "In Paradise" reached number nine in 1956. The single released by Dimension Records peaked at number six on Billboard's Hot R&B singles, number 17 on the Hot 100 charts, and number 4 in Canada.

In a song review for AllMusic, critic Richie Unterberger described it as:

Like several other girl group and indeed soul-pop songs of the era, it employed an irregular clapping rhythms, alternating two-claps with one-clap per measure. If that sounds like a simple formula, it's nonetheless pretty catchy, stimulating both the record's groove and making the words and melody more singable and memorable. The verses of "Chains" are R&B-tinged pop-rock, frequently bolstered by upbeat smoky sax riffs following lines of the lyric. The bridges got into a more sultry and seductive mood, sung not in unison as the verses were, but with a winsome and vulnerable lead voice poking out in front of the vocal arrangement.

Personnel

- Earl-Jean – lead vocals
- Margaret Ross – backing vocals
- Dorothy Jones – backing vocals
- Eva Boyd – backing vocals

== The Beatles' version ==
"Chains"
- Sheet music cover

Song by the Beatles

from the album Please Please Me
- Released: March 22, 1963 (UK Please Please Me); January 10, 1964 (US Introducing... The Beatles)
- Recorded: February 11, 1963
- Studio: EMI, London
- Genre: Rock and roll, R&B
- Length: 2:23
- Label: Parlophone
- Songwriters: Gerry Goffin, Carole King
- Producer: George Martin

The single by the Cookies was a popular cover song for Liverpool bands after its release in November 1962, and was included briefly in the Beatles' live sets. They recorded it on February 11, 1963 in four takes, the first proving to be the best. Lennon played the introduction on harmonica.

George Harrison sings the lead vocal on the Beatles' version and, as the fourth track from the group's first album, it represents the first time many fans heard Harrison singing lead on a commercially released song.

They played the song live on a number of BBC radio shows, including Side by Side, Here We Go and Pop Go the Beatles. Though none of those performances were included on the 1994 compilation Live at the BBC, it was eventually released on the 2013 compilation On Air – Live at the BBC Volume 2.

Personnel (from MacDonald)

- George Harrison – lead vocals, lead guitar
- John Lennon – rhythm guitar, harmonica, harmony vocals
- Paul McCartney – bass, harmony vocals
- Ringo Starr – drums
- Norman Smith – engineering

== Carole King version ==
"Chains"

Song by Carole King

from the album Pearls: Songs of Goffin and King
- Released: June 1980
- Recorded: January 1980
- Studio: Pecan Street Studios, Austin, Texas, US
- Genre: Pop
- Length: 2:56
- Label: Capitol
- Songwriters: Gerry Goffin, Carole King
- Producers: Carole King, Mark Hallman

In 1980, King recorded her own version of the song for her 1980 studio album Pearls: Songs of Goffin and King, consisting covers of songs King wrote with her first husband and songwriting partner, of which King co-produced with Mark Hallman. The same album also produced her last hit, "One Fine Day", which she co-wrote with Goffin and was previously a hit for the Chiffons in 1963.

== French version ==
"Chance"

Single by Sylvie Vartan
- Language: French
- B-side: "Réponds-moi"
- Released: January 1963
- Recorded: Late 1962
- Genre: Pop
- Length: 2:30
- Label: RCA
- Songwriters: Gerry Goffin, Carole King, Georges Aber

Sylvie Vartan singles chronology
"Moi je pense encore à toi" (1962)	"Chance" (1963)	"En écoutant la pluie" (1963)

"Chance"

Song by Johnny Hallyday

from the album Les Bras en croix
- Released: April 25, 1963
- Recorded: January–February 1963
- Genre: Pop rock
- Length: 2:25
- Label: RCA
- Songwriters: Gerry Goffin, Carole King, Georges Aber
- Producers: Lee Hallyday, Jack Baverstock

In 1963, the song was adapted into French by Georges Aber as "Chance" and was recorded by French pop singer Sylvie Vartan and released as a non-album single in January 1963. The song peaked at Number 33 on the French Belgian charts in June 1963. Around the same time, the French adaption was recorded by fellow singer and Vartan's future husband, Johnny Hallyday and was featured as the second track on Hallyday's 1963 studio album "Les Bras en croix" ("Arms crossed"), released that April as an album-only track.
