= Let's Turkey Trot =

- Single label crediting song to Goffin-King

Single by Little Eva
- B-side: "Down Home"
- Released: January 1963
- Genre: Pop, rhythm and blues
- Length: 2:30
- Label: Dimension 1000
- Songwriters: Gerry Goffin & either Jack Keller or Carole King
- Producer: Gerry Goffin

Little Eva singles chronology
"Keep Your Hands off My Baby" (1962)	"Let's Turkey Trot" (1963)	"Swingin' on a Star" (1963)

Alternative release
- Single label crediting song to Goffin-Keller

"Let's Turkey Trot" is a popular song with writing credits to Gerry Goffin and Jack Keller and/or Carole King. It was released by Little Eva as her third single for the Dimension label. The Little Eva's recording debuted on the charts on February 2, 1963, and peaked at #20 on the Hot 100. It was her third top 40 record. In Canada it reached #23, her third of four in the top 25.

The record features girl group the Cookies on background vocals, with the Cookies' lead Earl-Jean McCrea getting some solo lines. The song's title and lyrics seek to revive the turkey trot dance step, a step that was only briefly popular fifty years before the song was released; the song is played at a tempo much slower than the one used for the dance in its heyday. The B-side of the original single is a Goffin-King song called "Down Home" that is also found on the 1962 Llllloco-Motion LP.

Goffin and Keller first paired off in December 1961 as part of an impromptu swap of songwriters and lyricists at the Brill Building; Keller, whose lyricist at the time was Howard Greenfield, chose to collaborate with Goffin that day, while Greenfield tried his hand with Goffin's wife Carole King (King and Greenfield shared mutual friend Neil Sedaka, Greenfield's usual composer and Sedaka's high school acquaintance). The Greenfield-King collaboration, "Crying in the Rain," was also a hit.

In the film Easy Rider, Little Eva's "Let's Turkey Trot" is playing on the jukebox when the protagonists enter the café. The song was ambient sound and not a chosen song; it was omitted from the soundtrack album.

Cash Box said that it "should start the kids off on another dance craze-as the tag implies" and it was a "sparkling choral and instrumental showcase on a lid that can go all the way."

The song was covered by Jan & Dean on their 1963 album, Jan & Dean take Linda Surfin.

The Dollyrots covered the song on their EP A Dollyrots Christmas.
