= Shinin' On (song) =

Single by Grand Funk

from the album Shinin' On
- B-side: "Mr. Pretty Boy"
- Released: 1974
- Genre: Rock
- Length: 3:23
- Label: Capitol
- Songwriters: Don Brewer; Mark Farner
- Producer: Todd Rundgren

Grand Funk singles chronology
"The Loco-Motion" (1974)	"Shinin' On" (1974)	"Some Kind of Wonderful" (1974)

"Shinin' On" is a popular song written by Don Brewer and Mark Farner and recorded by Grand Funk as the title track for the band's 1974 album. Released as a single, it reached No. 11 on the Billboard Hot 100 in the US, and number 13 in Canada.

== Background ==
Guitarist Mark Farner came up with some chords, and drummer Don Brewer came up with the "Keep it shinin' on" theme and refrain. Brewer said, "We were kind of going for that kind of down and dirty R&B groove." They were hoping for a follow-up hit to "We're an American Band", and felt "Shinin' On" was good, but not quite chart-topping material, which eventually spurred them to cover "The Loco-Motion".

== In popular culture ==
The song was featured in a 1996 episode of The Simpsons, "Homerpalooza", as Homer Simpson is recounting some of his favorite bands to his kids and their friends.

== Charts ==
Chart (1974)	Peak position
Canada (RPM)	13
US Billboard Hot 100	11
