= Earl-Jean McCrea =

American pop and R&B singer (1942–2026)

- Born: Earl-Jean McCrea; July 9, 1942; Kannapolis, North Carolina, U.S.
- Died: May 7, 2026 (aged 83)
- Genres: Pop, R&B
- Occupations: Singer, organist
- Labels: Dimension Records, Colpix Records

Earl-Jean Reavis (née McCrea, also spelled McCree; July 9, 1942 – May 7, 2026) was an American pop and R&B singer who was a member of the vocal group The Cookies. Credited as Earl-Jean, she had a solo hit with the original version of "I'm into Something Good", written by Gerry Goffin and Carole King, and later a bigger hit for Herman's Hermits.

== Early life ==
Earl-Jean McCrea was born on July 9, 1942, in Kannapolis, North Carolina, United States. As a young teenager she lived in Coney Island, Brooklyn, where she attended Lincoln High School. In 1960, she married Grandison Reavis. Reavis had three children: Grandison Reavis, Dawn Reavis, and Demetrius Reavis, the last of whom predeceased her.

== Career ==
Reavis's older sister, Darlene McCrea, and the other original members of the Cookies – a group first formed in 1954 – eventually evolved into Ray Charles' backing group, the Raelettes. In 1961, Earl-Jean was persuaded to join a new version of the Cookies, alongside Dorothy Jones and Margaret Ross. The group was signed to Goffin and King's Dimension record label in 1962, and scored hits with "Don't Say Nothin' Bad (About My Baby)", and "Chains" (later covered by the Beatles).

During McCrea's years in the group, the Cookies were among the most sought-after backing vocalists of the early-1960s New York pop scene, singing on hits by other artists including Little Eva's "The Loco-Motion" (1962), Neil Sedaka's "Breaking Up Is Hard to Do", and Mel Tormé's "Comin' Home Baby" and they also recorded under alternate names such as the Cinderellas and the Honey Bees.

She left the Cookies, and signed for Colpix, recording "I'm into Something Good" (Colpix CP 729), which reached no. 38 on the Billboard Hot 100 and no. 42 on the Cash Box Top 100 in the United States. Later that year in Britain, a cover version by Herman's Hermits topped the UK Singles Chart and reached no. 13 on the Billboard Hot 100 in the United States. She recorded a follow-up single in 1964, again written by Goffin and King, called "Randy" (Colpix CP 748) but it failed to reach the chart listings.

== Later life and death ==
McCrea later worked as a specialist in early childhood, and opened a day care center, Dawn Child Care, in the Raleigh, North Carolina, area. She also founded the Sisters of Faith Scholarship Foundation and remained active in gospel music and church ministry. She died on May 7, 2026, at the age of 83.
