= À tout casser =

À tout casser may refer to:

- À tout casser (song), a 1968 song by Johnny Hallyday, the title song of the film
- À tout casser (film), a 1968 French-Italian film
