= Georges Aber =

French singer-songwriter (1930–2012)

Georges Poubennec (17 July 1930 – 16 March 2012), better known under the name Georges Aber, was a French singer-songwriter.

Poubennec was born in Brest. During the 1960s, he adapted the lyrics of many popular songs from English into French. He died in Plougastel, aged 81.

== Selected discography ==
=== As singer ===
- "Mes frères" / "Mon cœur bat" / "Rue de la solitude" / "Plus grand" – EP, 1959, Véga V 45 P 1994
- "Qu'il fait bon vivre" / "Oh oh, Madeleine!" / "J’ai rêvé" / "Je sais"- EP, 1959, Véga V 45 P 2019
- "Monsieur Seguin" / "Jericho" / "Pourquoi (Ya ya)" / "Comme un tigre (Tiger)" – EP, 1960, Véga V 45 P 2068
- "Je ris quand j’ai le blues" / "Des ya ya, des yé yé" / "Bravo au héros!" / "Quelquefois j’ai…" – EP, 1963, Polydor 27016

=== As songwriter or adapter ===
- For Johnny Hallyday : over fifty songs in all including: "Madison Twist" (1962; also covered by Sylvie Vartan), "Les Coups", French adaptation of "Uptight (Everything's Alright) (1966), "Noir c'est noir" (1966), "Amour d'été" (1967), "San Francisco" (1967), "Aussi dur que du bois" (1967), "À tout casser" (1968), "Mal" (1968), "Tant pis, c'est la vie" (1977), "Rien à personne" (1984).
- For Sylvie Vartan : "Panne d'essence" (1961), "Le Loco-motion" (1962), "ll revient" (1963), "Dum di la" (1964), "Sha La La" (1964), "Mister John B." (1966), "Irrésistiblement" (1968), "Bye bye love" (also performed by Danny Boy), "Un p'tit je ne sais quoi" (also recorded by Les Chats sauvages), "Chance", "Moi, je pense encore à toi" (also performed by Claude François), "Quand le film est triste", "Oui c'est lui", "Moi (je ne suis plus rien)"
- For Petula Clark : "Cœur blessé" (1962), "Mon bonheur danse" (1963), "Entre nous, il est fou" (1963), "Prends garde à toi" (1964), "Dans le temps" (1964), "Viens avec moi" (1965), "Mon amour" (1966), "Tout le monde veut aller au ciel mais personne ne veut mourir" (1966), "Va toujours plus loin", "Ya Ya Twist", "Partir, il nous faut", "Les gens diront", "Claquez vos doigts"
- For Frank Alamo : "Le chef de la bande", "Pas de larmes", "Reviens vite et oublie" (also performed by Les Surfs), "Je me bats pour gagner", "Non, ne dis pas adieu"
- For Richard Anthony : "Le p'tit clown de mon coeur", "Roly Poly", "Fich' le camp Jack", "Belle-maman" (also performed by Frankie Jordan), "Quand tu me diras oui"
- For Les Chaussettes Noires : "Tu parles trop", "Le Twist", "ll revient", "Peppermint twist"
- For Danyel Gérard : "Le Marsupilami", "lmprovisez le "Shout"", "Youpi ya Tamouré"
- For Noël Deschamps : "On joue avec son coeur", "Aujourd'hui tout va vite", "À quoi ça tient", "Souviens-toi que moi je t'aime", "La vie est un combat", "Tu n'es plus dans l'coup", "Cherche encore"

also:

- "Jericho" (John William-Colette Deréal-Caterina Valente)
- "L'orage" (John William)
- "J’ai rêvé" & "Je l'attends" (Dalida)
- "Mes Frères" (Dalida-Maria Candido-Anny Gould-John William-Dominique)
- "Cri de ma vie" (Richard Anthony-Sylvie Vartan-Les Pirates-Bob Azzam)
- "Cœur brisé à prendre" & "Papa Liszt twist" (Henri Salvador)
- "Venus en blue-jeans" (Claude François)
- "Toute ma vie" (Michel Sydney)
- "Qu'il fait bon vivre" (Annie Cordy-Les Compagnons de la chanson-Claude Robin)
- "Chéri chéri, je reviens" (Maya Casabianca)
- "Joue papa" (Jean Bretonnière)
- "Jamais je n'oublierai" (Orlando)
- "Bye, bye" (Nancy Holloway)
- "Bien trop court" (Dick Rivers)
- "J'irai n'importe où", "Personne comme toi", "Belle maman" & "Toi toi toi toujours toi" (Rocky Volcano)
- "Bang bang", "Quand une fille aime un garçon" & "Petite fille de français moyen" (Sheila)
- "Parc'que j'ai revu François" & "Cœur" (Ria Bartok)
- "Bientôt les vacances" (Monty)
- "Mais tu l'aimes" (Sandie Shaw)
- "Les secondes" (Alain Bashung)
- "Sur les vingt" (Pia Colombo)
- "Je ne peux l'acheter" (Les Lionceaux)
- "Quatre garçons dans le vent" (Les Lionceaux)
- "Ils font pleurer les filles" (Christine Lebail)
- "Je croyais" (Michèle Arnaud)
- "Ne mets pas de bleu" (French version of the Beatles's song Yes It Is) (Olivier Despax)
- "Ne Fais Pas La Tête" (French version of Nancy Sinatra's song How Does That Grab You?) (Katty Line)
