= Puppy love (disambiguation) =

Puppy love is feelings of love resembling the adoring, worshipful affection that may be felt by a puppy.

Puppy love may also refer to:

== Film and TV ==
- Puppy Love (TV series), a comedy television series on BBC Four
- Puppy Love (1919 film), a lost silent comedy film directed by Roy William Neill
- Puppy Love (1933 film), an animated short film starring Mickey Mouse
- Puppy Love, a 2012 Hallmark TV film with Candace Cameron Bure and others
- Puppylove (2013 film), a coming-of-age film directed by Delphine Lehericey
- Puppy Love (2020 film), a Canadian comedy drama film about a brain-damaged dishwasher and a street prostitute
- Puppy Love (2023 film), American romantic comedy film, a couple reunite after their two dogs unite
- "Puppy Love!", an episode of the TV show Bubble Guppies
- "Puppy Love", an episode of the TV show Barney & Friends
- "Puppy Love", an episode of the TV show Jim Henson's Pajanimals
- "Puppy Love", an episode of the TV show Back at the Barnyard
- "Puppy Love", an episode of the TV show T.U.F.F. Puppy
- "Puppy Love", an episode of the TV show Pocoyo

== Songs ==
- "Puppy Love" (Paul Anka song), covered in 1972 by Donny Osmond, and in 2002 by S Club Juniors
- "Puppy Love" (Bow Wow song), 2000
- "Puppy Love", a 1956 single by Jerry Samuels
- "Puppy Love", a 1958 single by Little Jimmy Rivers and the Tops
- "Puppy Love", a 1959 single by Dolly Parton, Bill Owens
- "Puppy Love", a 1962 song by Ike & Tina Turner; the B-side of "Tra La La La La"
- "Puppy Love", a 1964 single by Barbara Lewis
