= Pearls: Songs of Goffin and King =

Studio album by Carole King
- Released: June 1980
- Recorded: January 1980
- Studios: Pecan Street, Austin, TX
- Genres: Pop; rock
- Length: 33:22
- Label: Capitol
- Producers: Carole King, Mark Hallman

Carole King chronology
Touch the Sky (1979)	Pearls: Songs of Goffin and King (1980)	One to One (1982)

Professional ratings
Review scores
Source	Rating
AllMusic	4/5 stars
Robert Christgau	B−

Pearls: Songs of Goffin and King is the eleventh studio album by the American singer-songwriter Carole King, released in June 1980. It produced her last hit to date, "One Fine Day", which reached No. 12 on the charts.

== Track listing ==
All tracks are written by Gerry Goffin and Carole King.

Side one
No.	Title	Length
1.	"Dancin' with Tears in My Eyes"	3:31
2.	"Locomotion"	2:30
3.	"One Fine Day"	2:30
4.	"Hey Girl"	3:41
5.	"Snow Queen"	4:27

Side two
No.	Title	Length
1.	"Chains"	2:56
2.	"Oh No Not My Baby"	3:01
3.	"Hi De Ho"	3:35
4.	"Wasn't Born to Follow"	3:16
5.	"Goin' Back"	3:50
Total length:		33:22

== Personnel ==
- Carole King – lead vocals, piano (1, 2, 3, 5, 7, 10)
- Reese Wynans – keyboards
- Eric Johnson – lead guitar, rhythm guitar
- Christopher Cross – rhythm guitar (2, 6, 8)
- Mark Maniscalco – banjo
- Charles Larkey – bass guitar
- Steve Meador – drums
- Miguel Rivera – congas, percussion
- Bill Ginn – horn and string arrangements, conductor
- Akira Endo – strings director
- Richard Hardy – flute, alto saxophone, sax solos
- Tomás Ramírez – tenor saxophone
- Donald Knaub – bass trombone
- Michael Munday – trombone
- Ray Crisara – trumpet, cornet (8)
- Bobby Meyer – trumpet, cornet (8)
- Betty Whitlock – fiddle (9)
- Mark Hallman – backing vocals (6), guitar (10), harmonica (10)
- Oscar Ford Jr. – backing vocals (8)
- Gloria Hines – backing vocals (8)
- Deborah North – backing vocals (8)
- Lydia North – backing vocals (8)

Production

- Producers – Carole King and Mark Hallman
- Engineer – Chet Himes
- Assistant Engineer – James Tuttle
- Mastered by Bobby Hata at Warner Bros. Recording Studios (North Hollywood, CA).
- Art Direction and Design – Dick Reeves and John Wilson
- Photography – Sherry Goffin

== Chart positions ==
Chart (1980)	Peak position
Australia (Kent Music Report)	52
Canada RPM Albums Chart	96
US Billboard Top LPs & Tape	44
