= David Ervin =

American jazz musician

David Michael Ervin (born March 16, 1961, in Englewood, New Jersey, US) is an American jazz funk keyboard player.

He grew up in Altadena, California, where he began to take after his musical father DiFosco Ervin, a.k.a. Big Dee Irwin. DiFosco Ervin was a singer, songwriter, and recording artist who led the Doo-Wop singing group "The Pastels". At the age of 14, David combined elements of rock, funk and soul using analog synthesizers. Shortly thereafter David moved to digital keyboards and synthesizers.

A few years later around the age of 20, David Ervin became a sought after Los Angeles session musician. David created and performed complete rhythm tracks and continued to harness the cutting edge music technology of newly developed digital synthesizers and sequencers as tools to inspire his creations. David's tracks were heard on various 80's and 90's chart topping recordings. David's recording credits include hit albums by Tina Turner, Natalie Cole, Phyllis Hyman, Gladys Knight & the Pips, various albums by the Jacksons, including hits by Jermaine and Michael, The Crusaders and Joe Sample. David's songwriting credits include songs recorded by Bobby "Blue" Bland and Bobby Womack.
