= Shinin' On =

Studio album by Grand Funk Railroad
- Released: March 29, 1974
- Recorded: 1974
- Studio: The Swamp
- Genre: Hard rock
- Length: 33:52
- Label: Capitol Records
- Producer: Todd Rundgren

Grand Funk Railroad chronology
We're an American Band (1973)	Shinin' On (1974)	All the Girls in the World Beware!!! (1974)

Singles from Shinin' On
- 1. "The Loco-Motion"/"Destitute and Losin'" Released: May 1974; 2. "Shinin' On"/"Mr. Pretty Boy" Released: July 1974

Shinin' On is the eighth studio album by American rock band Grand Funk Railroad. The album was released in March 1974, by Capitol Records. Although not as successful as its predecessor, We're an American Band (1973), it peaked at #5 in the US and was certified gold, and its first single, a cover of "The Loco-Motion" topped the U.S. charts. The original release included stereoscopic glasses for viewing the artwork in 3D. The cover art was provided by graphics artist Neal Adams, based on an idea by the band's photographer Lynn Goldsmith and manager Andrew Cavaliere. A quadraphonic version of the album was released in 8-track format.

Professional ratings
Review scores
Source	Rating
AllMusic	2.5/5 stars
Christgau's Record Guide	B

== Track listing ==
Side one
No.	Title	Writer(s)	Length
1.	"Shinin' On"	Brewer, Farner	5:59
2.	"To Get Back In"	Farner	3:56
3.	"The Loco-Motion"	Goffin, King	2:46
4.	"Carry Me Through"	Brewer, Frost	5:34

Side two
No.	Title	Writer(s)	Length
5.	"Please Me"	Brewer, Farner	3:37
6.	"Mr. Pretty Boy"	Brewer, Farner, Frost	3:08
7.	"Gettin' Over You"	Brewer, Frost	3:59
8.	"Little Johnny Hooker"	Farner	4:59

CD release bonus tracks
No.	Title	Writer(s)	Length
9.	"Destitute and Losin'"	Farner	7:03
10.	"Shinin' On (2002 Remix)"	Brewer, Farner	6:09

== Personnel ==
Grand Funk Railroad

- Mark Farner – vocals, guitar, guitarrón, harmonica, organ on "Carry Me Through"
- Mel Schacher – bass
- Don Brewer – vocals, drums, percussion
- Craig Frost – organ, clavinet, moog, piano, mellotron, backing vocals

Additional and technical personnel

- Todd Rundgren – producer, engineer, guitar on "Carry Me Through", backing vocals, Echoplex
- John White – assistant engineer

2002 Remaster

- David K. Tedds – produced & compiled for reissue by
- Kevin Flaherty – supervising A&R producer
- Jimmy Hoyson – bonus track mix engineer
- Evren Göknar – mastering engineer
- Kenny Nemes – project manager
- Neil Kellerhouse – reissue art direction, design
- Steve Roeser – liner notes
- Brendan Gormley – editorial supervision
- Bryan Kelley – production
- Shannon Ward – production

== Charts ==
Album

Chart (1974)	Peak position
US Top LPs & Tape (Billboard)	5
Australia (Kent Music Report)	43
Canada (RPM)	2
Norway (VG-lista)	10

Singles

Year	Single	Chart	Position
1974	"The Loco-Motion"	Billboard Hot 100	1
1974	"The Loco-Motion"	Canada	1
1974	"The Loco-Motion"	Germany	10
1974	"The Loco-Motion"	Australia	7
1974	"Shinin' On"	Billboard Hot 100	11
1974	"Shinin' On"	Canada	13
