= Ronnie Mack =

American songwriter, singer, and talent manager

- Also known as: Rocco Mack
- Born: Ronald Augustus Mack; July 11, 1940; New York City, United States
- Died: November 5, 1963 (aged 23) The Bronx, New York City, U.S.
- Genres: Doo-wop, R&B, pop
- Occupations: Singer, songwriter
- Years active: 1955–1963
- Formerly of: The Marquis; Little Jimmy Rivers and the Tops; The Chiffons

Ronald Augustus Mack (July 11, 1940 – November 5, 1963) was an American songwriter, singer and talent manager who wrote "He's So Fine", a number one chart hit in 1963 for the Chiffons and the apparent inspiration for George Harrison's "My Sweet Lord". Mack's early death inspired Holland, Dozier and Holland to write the song "Jimmy Mack".

== Life and career ==
Ronnie Mack (known to his friends as Rocco) grew up in Soundview, Bronx, and loved music from childhood, teaching himself to play piano. By the mid-1950s he started writing songs, and also performed in a doo-wop vocal group, the Marquis, which unusually for the time featured a female lead singer, June Bateman (who later married musician Noble "Thin Man" Watts). In 1956, the group recorded a song co-written by Mack, "Bohemian Daddy", for the Onyx record label. After the Marquis split up, Mack formed a new group, the Highlights, who included singer Joyce Peterson, but they never recorded.

Mack moved to the Bronx but kept in touch with his Harlem friends and continued writing songs. He started writing for, and managing, another vocal group, the Young Lads, featuring lead singer Jimmy Rivers, and suggested that they add a female singer, Joyce Peterson's younger sister Sylvia. The group then became Four Bees and a Gee (for four boys and a girl), and auditioned with several of Mack's songs for Richard Barrett at Gone Records. Barrett renamed the group the Tops, and recorded them on one of Mack's up-tempo songs, "Puppy Love" (not the song of the same name written by Paul Anka). The song was first issued in late 1958 on the V-Tone label, and then on several other labels credited to Little Jimmy Rivers and the Tops. In late 1961, it was re-promoted and reissued more successfully in Philadelphia, and Rivers appeared as a solo act performing it on American Bandstand, but it failed to make the national charts.

In the Bronx, Mack heard a trio of students from James Monroe High School singing, and suggested that Sylvia Peterson join them. Mack rewrote one of the songs he had written for the Tops, "She's So Fine", originally written about Peterson, and changed the lyrics for the girl group to sing as "He's So Fine". The group, which Mack renamed the Chiffons, made a demo of several of Mack's songs, which he took to Hank Medress at Bright Tunes, a music publishing company set up by members of the Tokens. Jay Siegel of the Tokens later said of Mack's songs: "They had the most incredible lyrics; not intellectual lyrics, but just the things that people speak of in everyday language. Most people don't have the talent to write them down as music, but he did.... [Had he lived] he...would have been one of the most successful songwriters of the '60s."

The Chiffons re-recorded "He's So Fine" with members of the Tokens and with Carole King on piano, and it was released by Laurie Records in late 1962, reaching number one on both the Billboard Hot 100 and the R&B chart in March 1963. As a follow-up, the Chiffons also recorded another of Mack's songs, "Lucky Me", but it was unsuccessful.

== Illness, death and legacy ==
By the time "He's So Fine" started to become a chart hit, Mack was already terminally ill with Hodgkin's lymphoma. He died in 1963, aged 23, by which time the royalties received for the song had begun to raise his family out of poverty.

After his death, his mother Louise Mack attended a songwriters' convention at which her son won an award for "He's So Fine", and in accepting the award on his behalf gave a moving speech. Songwriters Lamont Dozier and Eddie Holland, who were also at the event, were inspired by the speech, remembered Mack's name, and co-wrote the song "Jimmy Mack", with its chorus of "Jimmy Mack, when are you comin' back?". Recorded by Martha and the Vandellas in 1964, "Jimmy Mack" became a major hit for the group in 1967.

Bright Tunes Music, the company which owned the rights to "He's So Fine", won a notable lawsuit against George Harrison, starting in 1971, for plagiarising Mack's tune with the song "My Sweet Lord". The judge ruled in favour of Bright Tunes, but found that it was a case of subconscious plagiarism. Much of the eventual settlement of $587,000 damages was paid to Mack's surviving family.
