= Keep Your Hands off My Baby =

Single by Little Eva
- B-side: "Where Do I Go?"
- Released: 1962
- Genre: Pop
- Length: 2:29
- Label: Dimension Records
- Songwriters: Gerry Goffin, Carole King
- Producer: Gerry Goffin

Little Eva singles chronology
"The Loco-Motion" (1962)	"Keep Your Hands off My Baby" (1962)	"Let's Turkey Trot" (1963)

"Keep Your Hands off My Baby"

Song by The Beatles

from the album Live at the BBC
- Released: 30 November 1994
- Recorded: 22 January 1963
- Genre: Merseybeat, pop
- Length: 2:31
- Label: Apple Records
- Songwriters: Gerry Goffin, Carole King
- Producer: George Martin (Executive producer)

"Keep Your Hands off My Baby"

Single by Kirsty MacColl
- B-side: "I Don't Need You"
- Released: 23 January 1981
- Label: Polydor
- Songwriters: Gerry Goffin, Carole King
- Producer: Barry Farmer

Kirsty MacColl singles chronology
"They Don't Know" (1979)	"Keep Your Hands off My Baby" (1981)	"There's a Guy Works Down the Chip Shop Swears He's Elvis" (1981)

"Keep Your Hands off My Baby" is a song written by Gerry Goffin and Carole King.

The most notable recording was by Little Eva, whose version reached No. 12 on the US Billboard Hot 100 and No. 30 on the UK Singles Chart in 1962.

== Chart history ==
Chart (1962)	Peak position
Canada (CHUM Chart)	11
UK Singles Chart	30
U.S. Billboard Hot 100	12
U.S. Billboard Hot R&B Singles	6

== Other recordings ==
Other artists who have recorded versions of the song include:

- The Beatles who recorded the song for the BBC radio show Saturday Club on 22 January 1963, which was first broadcast four days later. They also performed it the following month on their first British tour. It was later released on their album Live at the BBC, in 1994.
- Kirsty MacColl's version was released as a single in the UK on 23 January 1981 and peaked at number 123 on the Record Business singles chart in February 1981.
- Helen Shapiro
- Lindisfarne
- Skeeter Davis
- Kahoru Kohiruimaki (on 1985 album Call My Name)
- The Trashmen
- Ol' 55
- Wayne Fontana
