= À tout casser (song) =

Single by Johnny Hallyday

from the album Jeune homme
- Language: French
- English title: Breaking everything
- B-side: "Cheval d'acier"
- Released: 2 April 1968
- Recorded: September 1967
- Studio: Studio Blanqui, Studio La Gaité (Paris); Olympic Studios, Chappell Recording Studio (London)
- Genre: Rock
- Length: 2:48
- Label: Philips
- Songwriter(s): Johnny Hallyday, Georges Aber, Tommy Brown
- Lyricist(s): Georges Aber
- Producer(s): Micky Jones, Tommy Brown, Lee Hallyday

Johnny Hallyday singles chronology
| "L'histoire de Bonnie and Clyde" (1968) | "À tout casser" (1968) | "Le ciel nous fait rêver" (1968) |

Music video
- "À tout casser" (French TV, 1968) on YouTube

"À tout casser" is a song by French singer and actor Johnny Hallyday. It was used in the opening title sequence of the 1968 film of the same name. Hallyday also released it as a single and on his 1968 studio album Jeune homme ("Young man") The B-side "Cheval d'acier" ("Steel horse") also appears in the film, where Hallyday performs it on stage.

== Composition and writing ==
The song was written by Johnny Hallyday, Georges Aber, and Tommy Brown. The recording was produced by Micky Jones, Tommy Brown, and Lee Hallyday.

== Commercial performance ==
In France the single spent two weeks at no. 1 on the singles sales chart.

== Track listing ==
7" single Philips B 370.639 F (1968, France etc.)

A. "À tout casser" (2:48)
B. "Cheval d'acier" (2:29)

== Charts ==
| Chart (1968) | Peak position |
|---|---|
| Belgium (Ultratop 50 Wallonia) | 11 |
| France (Singles Sales) | 1 |
