= À tout casser (film) =

1968 French-Italian film by John Berry

- Original French theatrical poster
- Directed by: John Berry
- Written by: John Berry; Guy Lionel
- Starring: Eddie Constantine; Johnny Hallyday; Michel Serrault
- Distributed by: Distribuidores Reunidos; Golden Era Film Distributors; Metropolitan Film
- Release date: 2 October 1968 (France)
- Running time: 88 minutes
- Countries: France; Italy
- Language: French

À tout casser (English titles: The Great Chase, Breaking It Up; Italian title: Quella carogna di Frank Mitraglia) is a 1968 French-Italian film, directed by American blacklisted director John Berry (in exile in France).

== Cast ==
- Eddie Constantine – Ric
- Johnny Hallyday – Frankie
- Michel Serrault – Aldo Morelli
- Annabella Incontrera – Eva
- Catherine Allégret – Mimi
- Clément Michu – Gus
- Amarande – The widow
- Jean Rupert – The deceased's cousin
- Robert Lombard – Reggie
- Pierre Koulak – Charlie
- Hélène Soubielle – Jacqueline
- Denis Berry – Ange
- Yves Beneyton – Toto
- René Berthier – Morelli's partner
- Yves Barsacq – The inspector
- France Rumilly – Albert's daughter
- Hélène Duc – Albert's wife
- Jean-Pierre Zola – Albert, a bourgeois
- Roger Van Hool – Frankie's friend
- André Cagnard – Morelli's henchman (uncredited)
- Joël Barbouth
- Charles Dalin
- Yves Elliot
- Jean-François Gobbi
- Jean-Pierre Igoux
- Maritin

== See also ==
- "À tout casser", the title song from the film
