= Don't Say Nothin' Bad (About My Baby) =

Single by The Cookies
- B-side: "Softly in the Night"
- Released: 1963
- Recorded: 1963
- Genre: Pop rock; pop
- Length: 2:43
- Label: Dimension
- Songwriter(s): Gerry Goffin, Carole King
- Producer(s): Gerry Goffin

The Cookies singles chronology
| "Chains" (1962) | "Don't Say Nothin' Bad (About My Baby)" (1963) | "Will Power" (1963) |

"Don't Say Nothin' Bad (About My Baby)" is a 1963 song written by Gerry Goffin and Carole King for the girl group the Cookies. It was the group's most successful single and their only one to reach the top ten on the U.S. singles charts.

Critic Richie Unterberger, in a song review for AllMusic, noted:

The mindset of "Don't Say Nothin' Bad About My Baby" was sassy girl talk at its best ... The mood of the song as a whole, however, is catchy pop-rock with a bit of cool-jazz overlay, with a honking King Curtis-sounding sax solo in the instrumental break.

The single peaked at number seven on the Billboard Hot 100, number three on the Billboard R&B Singles charts in 1963, and #17 in Canada. Billboard ranked the song at number 86 on its list of 100 Greatest Girl Group Songs of All Time.

The song was ranked number 790 among the greatest singles ever made in Dave Marsh's book The Heart of Rock & Soul (1989).
