= Little Jimmy Rivers and the Tops =

Little Jimmy Rivers & the Tops
- Also known as: Four Bees and a Gee; The Tops; Little Jimmy and the Tops; The Extroads
- Origin: Harlem, New York City, United States
- Genres: Doo-wop, R&B
- Years active: 1958–1964
- Labels: V-Tone, Swan
- Past members: Jimmy Rivers; Vernon Rivers; Eddie Bonelli; Moses Groves; Sylvia Peterson; Pat Smith; Eleanor Carter

Little Jimmy Rivers & the Tops were an American doo-wop group from Harlem, New York, best remembered for their 1958 recording "Puppy Love" written by Ronnie Mack (later the writer of "He's So Fine"). The song became a local hit in Philadelphia in 1961. Sylvia Peterson, later of The Chiffons, sang with Little Jimmy & the Tops, sharing lead vocals with Jimmy on "Say You Love Me," the B-side of "Puppy Love."

== History ==
The group originated in Harlem in the mid-1950s as the Young Lads, comprising Vernon Rivers (b. c.1941), his younger brother Jimmy Rivers (b. c.1944), Eddie Bonelli (b.1941) and Louis Brown. The Rivers brothers were both born in Bishopville, South Carolina, moving to New York around 1953; Bonelli and Brown were both from New York. They soon replaced Brown with bass singer Moses Groves (b. 1941, Charleston, South Carolina), and began rehearsing and performing their own songs, many of which were co-written by their friend Ronnie Mack. Mack played piano with the group and acted as their mentor, suggesting that they add a girl singer, Sylvia Peterson (born September 30, 1946).

They changed their name to Four Bees and a Gee (for four boys and a girl), and performed in talent shows at the Apollo Theatre and elsewhere. At Mack's suggestion, they auditioned for Richie Barrett at Gone Records. Barrett proposed that they be renamed the Tops, and arranged for them to record two of Mack's songs, "Puppy Love" and "Say You Love Me", with Dave "Baby" Cortez on organ. The record was first released in late 1958 or early 1959 on the V-Tone label in Philadelphia, possibly because of Barrett's connections with V-Tone's owner, Venton "Buddy" Caldwell. It was subsequently reissued on several other small labels, credited to Little Jimmy Rivers and the Tops or sometimes Little Jimmy and the Tops. The record found little initial success. Bonelli left the group in 1960, and Peterson also left, being replaced by Pat Smith (a niece of saxophonist Red Prysock); Peterson later joined the Chiffons, and had a hit with Mack's song "He's So Fine". However, in late 1961 the Tops' record was re-promoted by Philadelphia radio DJs, and was reissued on the Swan label which had been co-owned by Dick Clark. Jimmy Rivers appeared on Clark's American Bandstand, without the other group members, to promote the record in early 1962, but it failed to break into the national charts.

The Tops continued to perform for a while, with Bonelli's sister Eleanor Carter replacing Pat Smith. However, in 1963/64 both Moses Groves and Vernon Rivers were drafted, and the group split up. Jimmy Rivers performed as a solo artist, and worked as a voice coach. In 1966, the Rivers brothers, Groves and Carter reformed, and renamed themselves the Extroads, recording a single, "The Verge".

Jimmy Rivers later moved to Germany where he has continued to work as a voice coach. Moses Groves became an artist and art teacher in the Bronx.
