= Big Dee Irwin =

American R&B singer (1932–1995)

- Born: DiFosco T. Ervin Jr. July 6, 1932; Harlem, New York, U.S.
- Died: August 27, 1995 (aged 63)
- Genres: Pop
- Occupations: Singer, songwriter
- Years active: 1954–1978
- Formerly of: The Pastels; Little Eva

DiFosco "Dee" T. Ervin Jr. (July 6, 1932 – August 27, 1995), better known as Big Dee Irwin, was an American R&B singer and songwriter whose biggest hit was a version of "Swinging on a Star" in 1963, recorded as a duet with Little Eva.

== Life and career ==
Dee Ervin was born in Harlem, New York. Some sources give his first name as Defosca and his family name as Erwin.

He joined the United States Air Force, and in 1954 was based at Narsarssuak Air Base in Greenland. While there, he formed a singing group, The Pastels, with himself as lead singer, Richard Travis (first tenor), Tony Thomas (second tenor) and Jimmy Willingham (baritone). They performed in Air Force talent shows and, after being transferred to Washington D.C., took part in a national show, Tops In Blue, in 1957. They then auditioned and won a contract with Hull Records in New York, and recorded a song written by Ervin, "Been So Long". The record was released locally on the subsidiary Mascot label before being leased to Chess Records who issued it on their Argo label. At the same time, the members of The Pastels were leaving the Air Force, Ervin being discharged in February 1958. "Been So Long" reached number 4 on the Billboard R&B chart and number 24 on the pop chart, and the Pastels toured widely and appeared on concert bills. In March 1958, they featured as part of Alan Freed's touring Big Beat Show, which also included Jerry Lee Lewis, Chuck Berry, Buddy Holly, Frankie Lymon, Larry Williams, and Screamin' Jay Hawkins. The group's second record, "You Don't Love Me Anymore", was released in April 1958, but was not a hit. They performed at the Apollo Theater later in 1958, but split up early the following year.

Ervin then started a solo career on Hull Records as Dee Erwin, and also recorded on the Bliss label, before signing for Dimension Records as Big Dee Irwin, and releasing a version of the 1944 Bing Crosby song "Swinging on a Star" which also featured Little Eva, though she was uncredited. In 1963, the song reached number 38 on the US pop chart. It became a bigger hit in the UK where it rose to number 7, and Irwin then took part in a nine-month tour of Britain. Neither Irwin's follow-up, "Happy Being Fat", again with Little Eva, nor later releases on Dimension, were successful. However, Irwin continued to release singles for a variety of labels through the 1960s, and also worked as a songwriter for Ray Charles, Bobby Womack, and others; the Hollies included his "What Kind of Boy" on their 1964 album In The Hollies Style. In 1964 Irwin performed at the New Musical Express Poll-winners concert at Empire Pool Wembley to an audience of 11,000; other performers at the concert included The Beatles, The Hollies, The Rolling Stones and other artists. In 1976, initially under the name DiFosco, he released the disco single "Face to Face". His last record release was in 1978.

Irwin died of heart failure in 1995. His son, David Ervin, has played piano professionally as a studio musician.

== Discography ==
=== Hull Records (as Dee Erwin) ===
- "I Can't Help It (I'm Falling In Love)" / "Rubin, Rubin" — 1959
- "Let's Try Again" /"'Tis Farewell" — 1960

=== Bliss Records (as Dee Erwin) ===
- "Someday You'll Understand Why" / "Anytime" — 1961

=== Dimension Records (as Big Dee Irwin; * with Little Eva; ** with The Breakaways) ===
- "Everybody's Got a Dance But Me" / "And Heaven Was Here" — 1962
- "Swinging on a Star" * / "Another Night with the Boys" * — 1963 - U.S. No. 38, UK No. 7
- "Happy Being Fat" * / "Soul Waltzin'" — 1963
- "Skeeter" / "You're My Inspiration" — 1963
- "The Christmas Song" * / "I Wish You a Merry Christmas" * — 1963
- "Heigh-Ho" ** / "I Want So Much to Know You" ** — 1964

=== 20th Century Fox Records (as Big Dee Irwin) ===
- "Donkey Walk" / "Someday You'll Understand Why" — 1963

=== Roulette Records (as Dee Erwin) ===
- "Discotheque" / "The Sun's Gonna Shine Tomorrow" — 1965
- "Are You Really Real" / "The Mouse"

=== Rotate Records (as Big Dee Irwin) ===
- "I Wanna Stay Right Here With You" / "You Satisfy My Needs" — 1965
- "Follow My Heart" / "Stop Heart" — 1965

=== Fairmont Records (as Big Dee Irwin) ===
- "Sweet Young Thing Like You" / "You Really Are Together" — 1966

=== Astra Records (as Dee Irwin) ===
- "I Can't Help It" / "My One and Only Dream" — 1966

=== Phil-La Records (as Big Dee Irwin) ===
- "Better to Have Loved and Lost" / "Linda" — 1967

=== Polydor Records (as Big Dee Irwin and Suzie [Maria Pereboom]) ===
- "Ain't That Lovin' You Baby" / "I Can't Get Over You" — 1968

=== Imperial Records (as Dee Irwin) ===
- "I Only Get This Feeling" / "Wrong Direction" — 1968
- "I Can't Stand the Pain" / "My Hope to Die Girl" — 1968

=== Imperial Records (as Big Dee Irwin and Mamie Galore) ===
- "By the Time I Get to Phoenix" / "I Say a Little Prayer" — 1968
- "Day Tripper" / "I Didn't Wanna Do It, But I Did" — 1969
- "Ain't No Way" / "Cherish" — 1969

=== Earthquake Records (as DiFosco) ===
- "Sunshine Love" / "You Saved Me from Destruction" — 1971

=== Signpost Records (as Dee Ervin) ===
- "Darling, Please Take Me Back" (Stereo) / "Darling, Please Take Me Back" (Mono) — 1972

=== Roxbury Records ===
- "You Broke My Face" / "Face to Face" — 1976 (as DiFosco)
- "You Broke My Face" / "Face to Face" — 1976 (as Dee Ervin)
- "The I Love You Song" / "I Can't Get You Off My Mind" — 1976 (as Dee Ervin)

=== 20th Century Fox (as Dee Erwin) ===
- "The I Love You Song" / "Ship of Love" - 1978
