= We're an American Band =

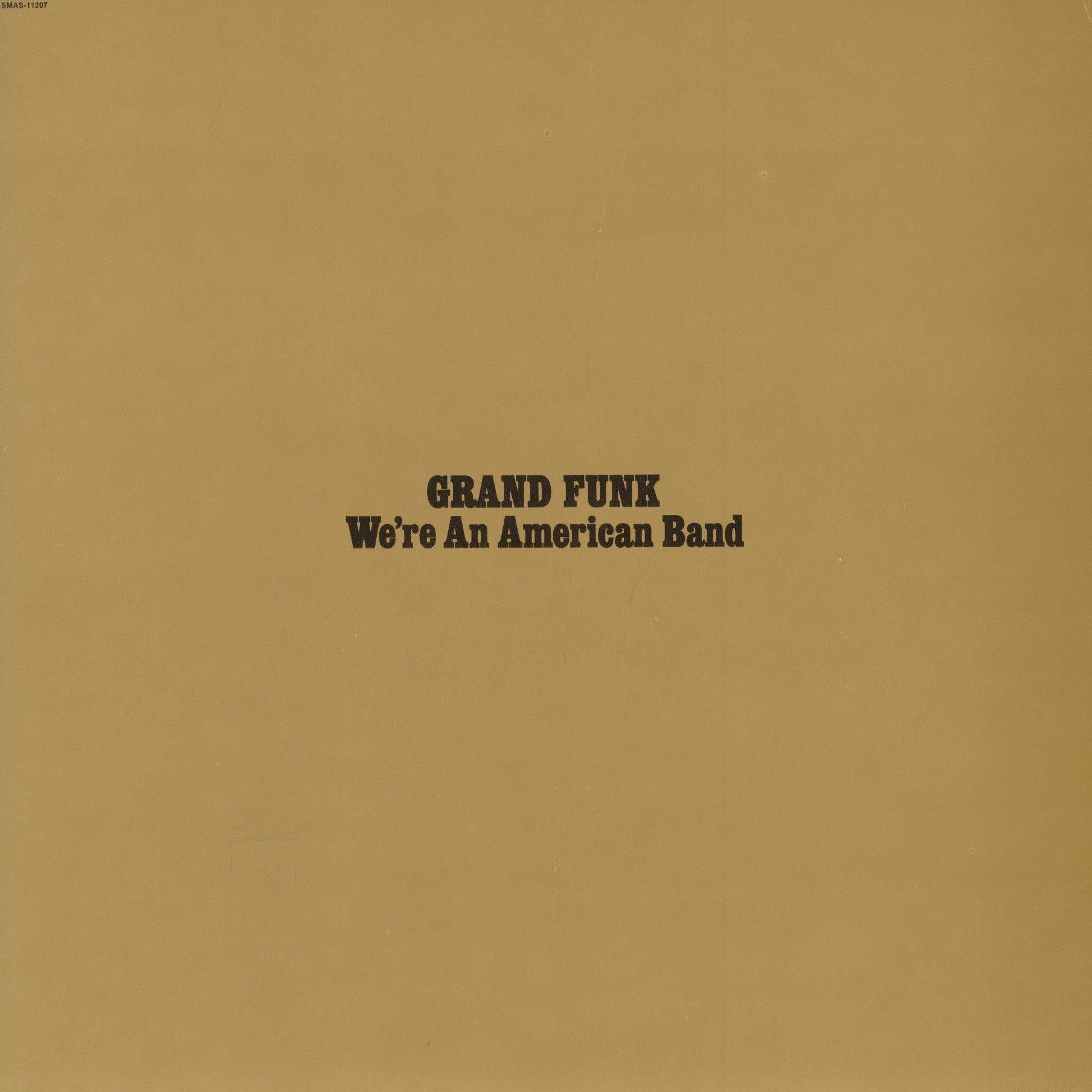

Studio album by Grand Funk Railroad
- Released: July 1973
- Recorded: June 12–15, 1973
- Studios: Criteria, Miami
- Genre: Hard rock
- Length: 39:48
- Label: Capitol
- Producer: Todd Rundgren

Grand Funk Railroad chronology
Phoenix (1972)	We're an American Band (1973)	Shinin' On (1974)

Singles from We're an American Band
- 1. "We're an American Band"/"Creepin'" Released: July 2, 1973; 2. "Walk Like a Man"/"The Railroad" Released: October 29, 1973

Professional ratings
Review scores
Source	Rating
AllMusic	4.5/5 stars
Christgau's Record Guide	B−
The Rolling Stone Album Guide	3/5 stars

We're an American Band is the seventh studio album by American hard rock band Grand Funk Railroad, credited as Grand Funk. The album was released by Capitol Records in July 1973, and was certified gold by the RIAA a little over a month after its release. Two singles were released from the album. The title track was the first single from the album released on July 2, 1973 and the second, "Walk Like a Man", was released on October 29, 1973. Both were sung by drummer Don Brewer. There was also an addition to the band's membership with this release - Craig Frost - who played the organ, clavinet and Moog. Prior to We're an American Band being released, Grand Funk Railroad had been a power trio. Craig was credited as an additional musician on Phoenix, which was released the previous year.

The album cover was originally covered in gold-colored foil on the outside, and the initial run of pressings were pressed in clear, dark yellow vinyl to simulate or suggest a "gold" record. The album has been reissued many times and is currently available in the Compact Disc format. A Quadraphonic mix of the album was available in the Quadraphonic 8-Track cartridge format.

The album is #200 of the National Association of Recording Merchandisers (NARM) Definitive 200 albums of all time.

== Recording, production, artwork, and packaging ==
We're an American Band was the group's first collaboration with producer-engineer Todd Rundgren. Rundgren and the band recorded the album at Criteria Studios in Miami, Florida on June 13–15, 1973. Rundgren would go on to produce the band's next album, Shinin' On (1974), before the band switched to Jimmy Ienner.

The album's original issue, as well as the "We're an American Band" single, was on translucent yellow vinyl, symbolic of a 'Gold record'. The album labels, above the side numbers, instructed listeners to play "at full volume". It included a sticker sheet (two blue, and two red) with the Grand Funk "Pointing Finger" logo. Emphasizing the shortening of the group's name, the word "Railroad" does not appear anywhere on the album sleeve, liner, or vinyl record, except as the title of the first song on side two of the album.

== Reception ==
Upon the album's release, We're an American Band became the band's best-received album by critics, so far. Robert Christgau gave the album a B−, his highest rating for a Grand Funk Railroad album at the time (although Shinin' On (1974) and Grand Funk Hits (1976) would receive a B and B+, respectively). A modern review of the album by William Ruhlmann for AllMusic stated that the album was a departure from the band's usual material, which was mostly due to Todd Rundgren's production and Don Brewer's increase in lead vocal work. Ruhlmann also said that the album sounded more professional than their previous ones.

It peaked at number 2 on the Billboard 200, the band's highest position on the chart, but spent one week at number 1 on the Cash Box, and Record World album charts.

== Track listing ==
Side one
No.	Title	Writer(s)	Lead vocals	Length
1.	"We're an American Band"	Don Brewer	Brewer	3:27
2.	"Stop Lookin' Back"	Brewer, Mark Farner	Brewer	4:52
3.	"Creepin'"	Farner	Farner	7:02
4.	"Black Licorice"	Brewer, Farner	Brewer	4:45

Side two
No.	Title	Writer(s)	Lead vocals	Length
5.	"The Railroad"	Farner	Farner	6:12
6.	"Ain't Got Nobody"	Brewer, Farner	Farner	4:26
7.	"Walk Like a Man"	Brewer, Farner	Brewer	4:05
8.	"Loneliest Rider"	Farner	Farner	5:17

2002 bonus tracks
No.	Title	Writer(s)	Lead vocals	Length
9.	"Hooray"	Brewer, Farner	Brewer and Farner	4:05
10.	"The End"	Brewer, Farner	Brewer	4:12
11.	"Stop Looking Back" (acoustic mix)	Brewer, Farner	Brewer	3:04
12.	"We're an American Band" (2002 remix)	Brewer	Brewer	3:32

== Personnel ==
Per sleeve notes

=== Grand Funk Railroad (credited as Grand Funk) ===
- Mark Farner – vocals, guitar, acoustic guitar, conga; electric piano on "Creepin'"
- Craig Frost – organ, clavinet, electric piano, Moog
- Mel Schacher – bass
- Don Brewer – vocals, drums, percussion

=== Production ===
Per sleeve notes

- Todd Rundgren – producer, engineer
- Francesco Damanti – engineer
- Seth Snyder – assistant engineer
- Lynn Goldsmith & Andrew Cavaliere – album design and concept
- Lynn Goldsmith – photography
- John Hoernle – art direction
- Andrew Cavaliere – management

=== 2002 Remaster ===
- David K. Tedds – produced & compiled for reissue by, bonus track mix engineer
- Kevin Flaherty – supervising A&R producer
- John Hendrickson – bonus track mix engineer
- Jimmy Hoyson – bonus track mix engineer
- Evren Göknar – mastering engineer
- Steve Roeser – liner notes

== Charts ==
Chart (1973)	Peak position
Australia	27
Canadian Top Albums	4
German Albums	46
Norwegian Top 40 Albums	12
US Billboard 200	2
US Cash Box Top 100 Albums	1
US Record World Album Chart	1

Singles

Year	Single	Chart	Position
1973	"We're an American Band"	Billboard Hot 100	1
1973	"We're an American Band"	Canada	4
1973	"We're an American Band"	Australia	87
1973	"Walk Like a Man"	Billboard Hot 100	19
1973	"Walk Like a Man"	Canada	16
