= Ria Bartok =

French singer (1943–1970)

- Born: Marie-Louise Pleiss; January 28, 1943; Einbeck, Germany
- Died: March 2, 1970 (aged 27); Paris, France
- Occupation: Singer
- Years active: 1963-1967

Marie-Louise Pleiss, stage name Ria Bartok (28 January 1943 Einbeck, Germany – 2 March 1970 Paris), was a French singer of yéyé pop songs.

Bartok was the daughter of an opera singer. She saw her first success at the age of 20 with the song "Parce que j'ai revu François". Part of the yéyé wave of the 1960s, she saw her greatest success with the song "Et quelque chose me dit".

Her last concert in France was on 13 May 1967. She died in 1970 at her home from a fire caused by a cigarette.

== Selected discography ==
- "Parce que j'ai revu François" (after Johnny Hallyday Parce que j'ai revu Linda) – her first success at the age of 20
- "Écoute mon cœur"
- "J'y pense tout bas"
- "C'est bien fait"
- "Et quelque chose me dit" – her best known song
- "N'importe quoi"
- "Un baiser"
- "Ce monde" (also sung by Richard Anthony)
- "Diggedle Boeing" (also released in English as "See if I Care")
