= The Chiffons =

American girl group

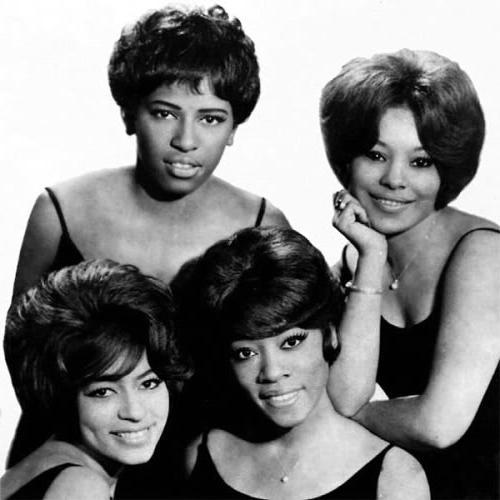
- The Chiffons in 1966

Background information
- Also known as: The Four Pennies
- Origin: The Bronx, New York City, United States
- Genre: Pop
- Years active: 1960–present
- Label: Laurie
- Members: Judy Craig; Patricia Bennett; Connie Harvey
- Past members: Barbara Lee; Sylvia Peterson

The Chiffons are an American girl group originating from the Bronx, a borough of New York City, in 1960.

== History ==
=== Origins ===
The group was originally a trio of schoolmates – lead singer Judy Craig, backed by Patricia Bennett and Barbara Lee – enrolled at James Monroe High School in the Bronx in 1960. In 1962, at the suggestion of songwriter Ronnie Mack, the group added Sylvia Peterson, who had sung with Little Jimmy & the Tops at age 14, sharing lead vocals with Jimmy on "Say You Love Me", the B-side of the Tops' 1959 local hit "Puppy Love".

=== Recordings ===
The group chose the name The Chiffons while recording and releasing their first single, "He's So Fine", written by Ronnie Mack, produced by The Tokens of "The Lion Sleeps Tonight" fame, and released on the Laurie Records label. "He's So Fine" hit No. 1 in the United States, selling over one million copies, and was awarded a gold disc. (This sales figure would have qualified the record for platinum status under the current [as of 2011] RIAA certification standards, effective since 1975, which lowered the "gold" certification threshold to 500,000 copies and set the "platinum" threshold at 1 million.)

The Chiffons immediately released their first LP He's So Fine (which charted at No. 97) and began touring the East Coast and Midwest states primarily. Within a few months, the group released their second LP, One Fine Day.

The group also released two singles in 1963 as the Four Pennies (with Sylvia on lead) on the Laurie Records subsidiary Rust, but they abandoned the Four Pennies name as the success of "He's So Fine" became clear. This first hit was followed by other notable tunes such as Gerry Goffin and Carole King's "One Fine Day", "Sweet Talkin' Guy" and "I Have a Boyfriend". As the 1960s progressed, Peterson assumed a more prominent role in the group, singing lead on "Why Am I So Shy"; "Strange, Strange Feeling"; "The Real Thing"; "Up On The Bridge"; and "My Block" (written by Jimmy Radcliffe, Carl Spencer and Bert Berns).

Shortly after the first round of hits, the Chiffons had business problems but still continued to tour the US throughout 1964 (including Murray the K Shows and as part of a package tour headlined by Gene Pitney). In mid-1965, they signed directly to the Laurie label, and had a hit with "Nobody Knows What's Going On In My Mind But Me". To promote the record, Sylvia and Barbara flew to the West Coast to premiere the disc on a July 1965 Shindig episode, with two substitute members as Judy and Pat were on maternity leave.

The next top 10 hit for the Chiffons was "Sweet-Talking Guy" in mid 1966. The success of the song resulted in the Chiffons releasing their third LP, Sweet Talking Guy, which peaked at No. 149 on the Billboard 200 LP chart. The Chiffons did their first overseas tour of England and Germany in June 1967; on one of their London club dates (the Chiffons were one of the opening acts for Jimi Hendrix), members of the Beatles and Rolling Stones were in the audience.

Laurie released several minor US chart hits of the Chiffons (including "Up on the Bridge", "My Boyfriend's Back") until the end of the 60s. One track "Just for Tonight" was a big Canadian hit in 1968.

=== Personnel changes ===
Tiring of the constant touring and lack of hits, Judy Craig left the group in 1972, and took a bank job in Manhattan. The remaining trio continued to do live shows with Sylvia now as permanent lead singer. Eventually, Sylvia, Pat, and Barbara took on regular 9-5 jobs, but continued to do live shows on weekends. Sylvia eventually left, and her spot was taken by alternating friends of the group.

In 1970, George Harrison released the song "My Sweet Lord", whose musical similarities to "He's So Fine" prompted the estate of Ronnie Mack to file a copyright infringement claim. The Chiffons went on to record "My Sweet Lord" in 1975. A judge later found that Harrison had unintentionally plagiarized the earlier song.

Sylvia returned to the Chiffons during the 1980s. On May 15, 1992, Barbara Lee died from a heart attack, and Craig returned to the group. Peterson retired shortly thereafter and was replaced by Connie Harvey. Harvey has since left to pursue a solo career and Bennett has retired from the group.

As of 2023, Judy Craig occasionally performs with her eldest daughter and a niece. Pat Bennett lives in Georgia. Sylvia Peterson retired from her career in healthcare, and died on July 28, 2023, at the age of 77.

== Discography ==
=== Studio albums ===
- 1963: He's So Fine Laurie Records – LLP 2018 (US No. 97)
- 1963: One Fine Day Laurie Records – LLP 2020
- 1966: Sweet Talkin' Guy Laurie Records – SLP 2036 (US #149)
- 1970: My Secret Love B.T. Puppy Records – BTPS-1011

=== Compilation albums ===
- 1974: Everything You Always Wanted to Hear by the Chiffons but Couldn't Get
- 1979: The Chiffons Sing the Hits of the 50s & 60s
- 1994: Boys! Boys! Boys!
- 2004: Absolutely the Best!
- 2006: Sweet Talkin' Girls

=== Singles ===
Year	Title	Peak chart positions		
Year	Title	US	US R&B	UK
1963	"When the Boy's Happy (The Girl's Happy Too)" (credited as the Four Pennies)	95	—	―
1963	"My Block" (credited as the Four Pennies)	67	—	―
1963	"He's So Fine"	1	1	16
1963	"One Fine Day"	5	6	29
1963	"A Love So Fine"	40	40	―
1964	"I Have a Boyfriend"	36	36	—
1964	"Sailor Boy"	81	81	―
1965	"Nobody Knows What's Goin' On (In My Mind but Me)"	49	―	―
1965	"Tonight I'm Gonna Dream"	―	―	―
1966	"Sweet Talkin' Guy"	10	―	31
1966	"Out of This World"	67	―	―
1966	"Stop, Look and Listen"	85	―	―
1966	"My Boyfriend's Back"	―	―	―
1968	"Up on the Bridge"	—	―	—
1968	"Just for Tonight"	―	―	―
1972	"Sweet Talkin' Guy" (UK re-release)	―	―	4
1975	"My Sweet Lord"	―	―	―
1976	"Dream Dream Dream"	―	―	―
"—" denotes releases that did not chart or were not released in that territory.

== In popular culture ==
- Chiffon is the name of one of the girl-group-inspired narrators in the musical Little Shop of Horrors.

== Bibliography ==
- Clemente, John (2000). Girl Groups - Fabulous Females That Rocked The World. Iola, Wisconsin. Krause Publications. p. 276. ISBN 0-87341-816-6
- Clemente, John (2013). Girl Groups - Fabulous Females Who Rocked The World. Bloomington, Indiana Authorhouse Publications. p. 623. ISBN 978-1-4772-7633-4 (sc); ISBN 978-1-4772-8128-4 (e).
