= Dimension Records =

American record label

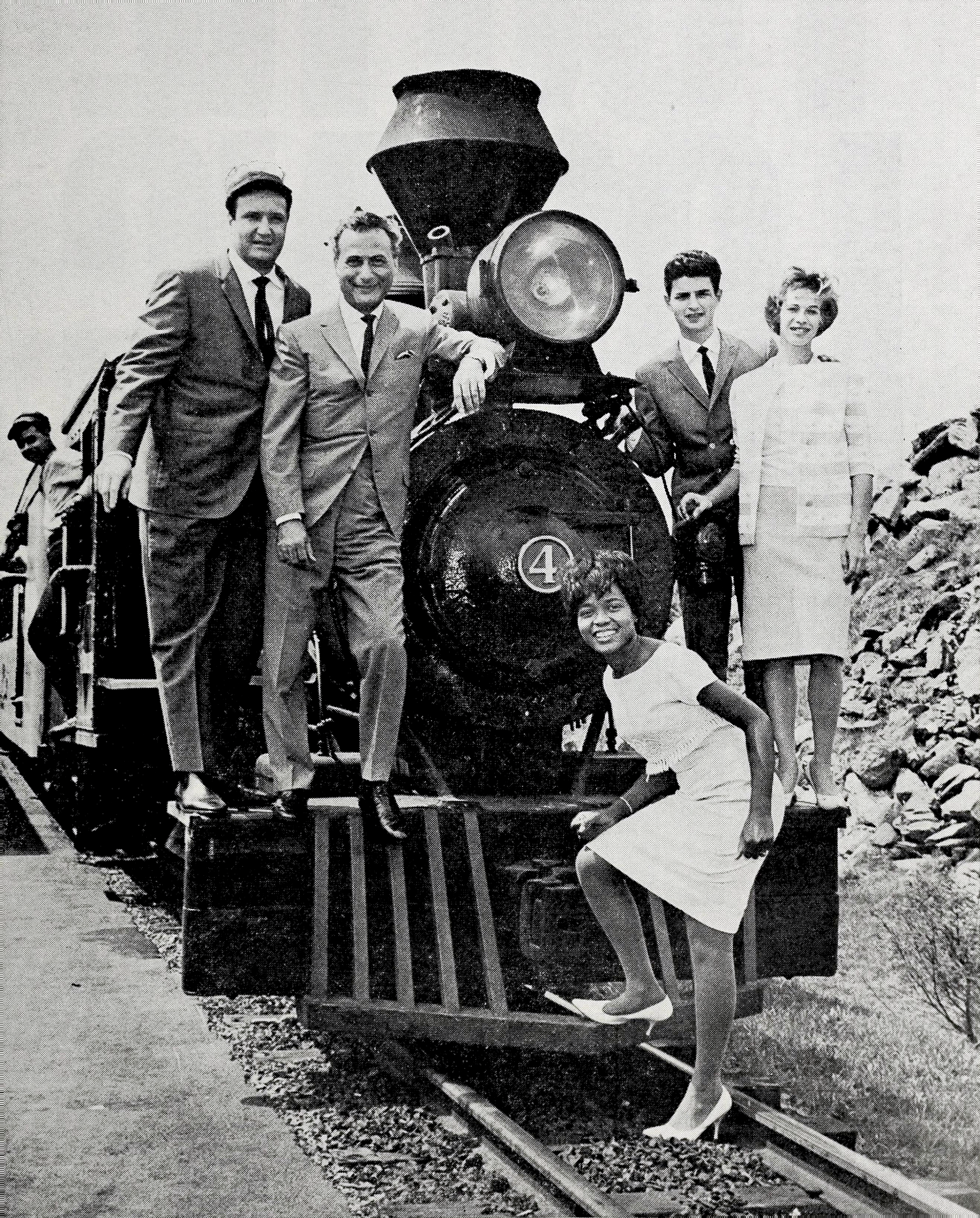
- Dimension Records 1962 promotion featuring Don Kirshner, Al Nevins, Little Eva, Gerry Goffin, and Carole King
- Parent company: Independent
- Founded: 1962
- Founder: Don Kirshner and Al Nevins
- Status: Defunct, catalog acquired by Roulette Records now part of Rhino Entertainment
- Distributor: Independently

Dimension Records was a record label founded in 1962 in New York City by Don Kirshner and Al Nevins, owners of Aldon Music. It concentrated on the girl group sound and showcased songs by Gerry Goffin and Carole King. Their composition "The Loco-Motion", sung by Little Eva, gave it its biggest hit. Background vocals on that record were by The Cookies, who had their own hits on the label, including "Chains", which was later recorded by The Beatles. In the UK, Dimension was licensed to London Records.

When Aldon Music was sold to Columbia Pictures, Dimension Records was sold with it, whereupon another hit was Big Dee Irwin's "Swinging on a Star", featuring an uncredited Little Eva, on Colpix Records in the UK (1963).

The catalog was eventually acquired by Roulette Records, which was in turn acquired by Rhino Records which is now a unit of Warner Music Group. Rhino controls the North American rights while Warner's Parlophone unit has the rights for the rest of the world.

== See also ==
- List of record labels
