= The Loco-Motion =

1962 song written by Gerry Goffin and Carole King

- A-side of U.S. vinyl release

Single by Little Eva

from the album Llllloco-Motion
- B-side: "He Is the Boy"
- Released: June 1962
- Recorded: 1961
- Genre: Pop, rhythm and blues
- Length: 2:27
- Label: Dimension 1000
- Songwriters: Gerry Goffin, Carole King
- Producer: Gerry Goffin

Little Eva singles chronology
"The Loco-Motion" (1962)	"Keep Your Hands Off My Baby" (1962)

Audio video
- "The Loco-Motion" on YouTube

"The Loco-Motion" (or "Locomotion") is a pop song written by American songwriters Gerry Goffin and Carole King. It was originally written for R&B singer Dee Dee Sharp, but she turned the song down.

The song is especially notable for making three appearances in the American top 3, each in a different decade and by a different artist: in 1962 by Little Eva (U.S. No. 1); in 1974 by Grand Funk Railroad (also U.S. No. 1); and in 1988 by Kylie Minogue (U.S. No. 3).

The song is an enduring example of the dance-song genre; much of the lyrics are devoted to a description of the dance itself, usually performed as a type of line dance.

"The Loco-Motion" was the second song to reach No. 1 in the charts by two different musical acts in America, the earlier song to do this being "Go Away Little Girl", also written by Goffin and King. "The Loco-Motion" is one of only 9 songs to ever achieve this feat so far.

== Little Eva version ==
=== Background ===
King and Goffin wrote "The Loco-Motion" in hopes to have it recorded by Dee Dee Sharp, who had a hit with "Mashed Potato Time" in 1962. Sharp passed on the song, leaving the opportunity open for Eva Boyd, who had recorded the demo. Boyd's version was released, and her name was changed to Little Eva. Boyd was Carole King's babysitter, having been introduced to King and King's husband Gerry Goffin by The Cookies, a local girl group who would also record for the songwriters.

"The Loco-Motion" was the first release by the new Dimension Records company, whose releases were mostly penned and produced by Goffin and King. There are two common versions of the song in circulation: one includes handclaps during the verses; the other has no handclaps. King performed the backup vocals in the recording.

=== Reception ===
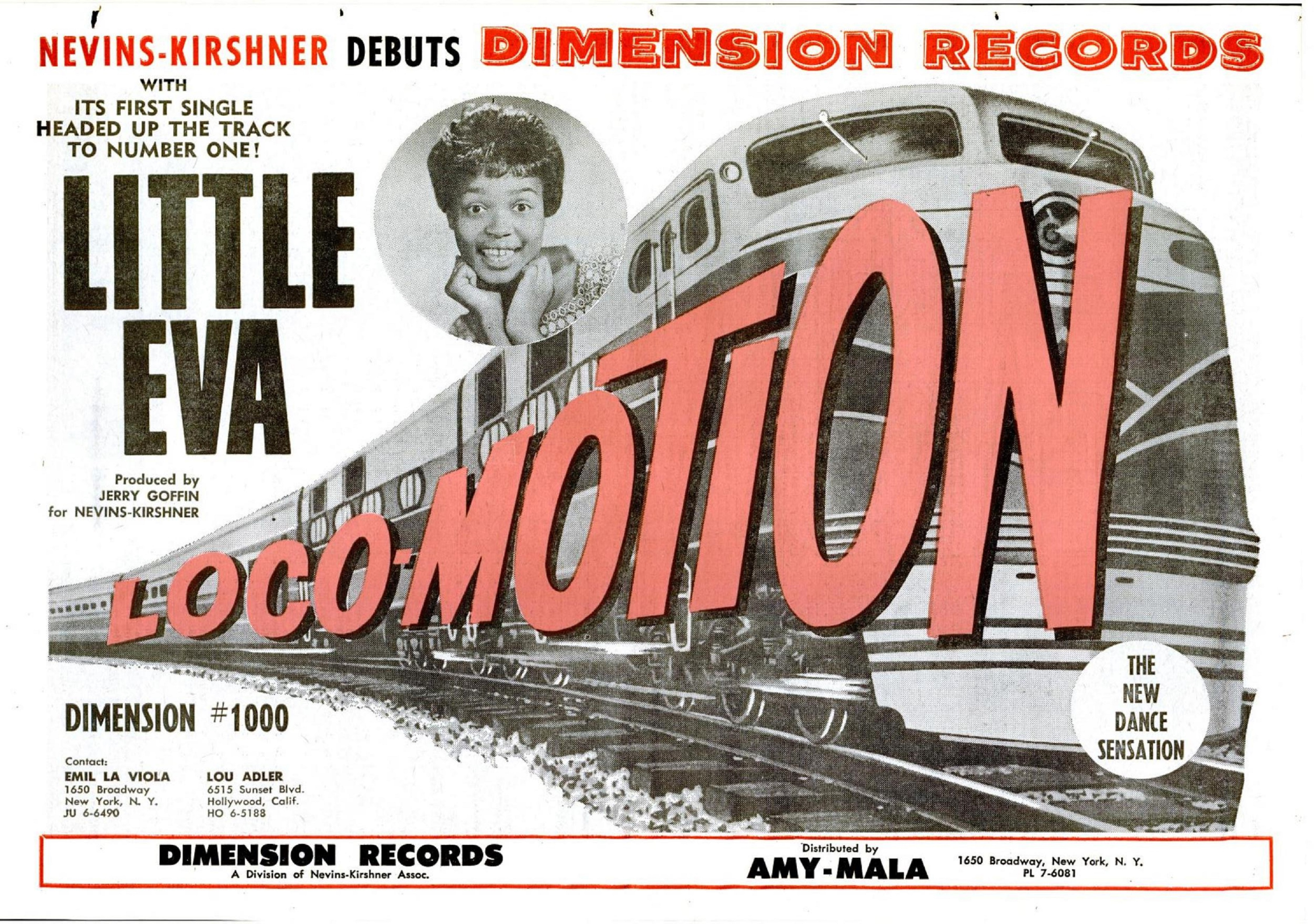
The single advertised in Billboard magazine, July 21, 1962

In the United States, "The Loco-Motion" was the seventh most successful single of 1962, according to Billboard. It was also the third most successful single of 1962 in South Africa.

In March 1965, Little Eva sang the song on the ABC-TV series Shindig!, and this is the only known video of her singing this song. A cover version of the song was recorded quickly by British girl group the Vernons Girls and scored the chart the same week as the Little Eva version. The Vernons Girls' version stalled at No. 47 in the UK, while the Little Eva version reached No. 2 on the UK charts. It re-entered the chart some 10 years later and almost became a top 10 hit again, peaking at No. 11. The Little Eva version of the song was later featured in the David Lynch film Inland Empire (2006). "The Loco-Motion" is ranked No. 359 on Rolling Stone's list of "The 500 Greatest Songs of All Time". In 2016, the 1962 Little Eva version of "The Loco-Motion" on Dimension Records was inducted into the Grammy Hall of Fame.

=== "The Loco-Motion" myths ===
An initially widely believed story of how the song "The Loco-Motion" came to be was that Carole King was playing music at home and Eva Boyd, who was doing some chores, started dancing to it; and that became The Loco-Motion dance. However, this is not true. Eva Boyd was introduced to Goffin and King, they liked her singing voice, and had her record "The Loco-Motion". King stated this during an interview on National Public Radio (NPR) shortly after Little Eva died.

As the song came before the dance, there was no dance when the song was originally written. When the song became a smash hit, Eva Boyd ended up creating a dance to go along with the song. King stated this in her "One to One" concert video. In live performances of the song, Little Eva can be seen doing her version of the dance.

Another bit of the conventional lore was that Boyd received only $50 for "The Loco-Motion". However, although Boyd never owned any rights to her recordings, it seems $50 was actually her weekly salary during the years she was making records (an increase of $15 from what Goffin and King had been paying her as nanny). In 1971, she moved to North Carolina and lived in obscurity on menial jobs and welfare until she was rediscovered in 1987. She died of cervical cancer in 2003.

Top-40 DJ Dan Ingram has been quoted as saying that he believes the original "The Loco-Motion" was recorded by King herself. Producer Pete Waterman has also stated he believes it is King singing on the recording.

=== Weekly charts ===
Chart (1962–63)	Peak position
Argentina (Cash Box)	3
Belgium (Flanders) (Juke Box Magazine)	5
Belgium (Wallonia) (Juke Box Magazine)	3
Canada (CHUM Charts)	1
France (SNEP)	4
Ireland (Teenage Express)	4
Israel (Kol Yisrael)	2
Japan (Utamatic)	4
Netherlands (Platennieuws)	7
New Zealand (Lever Hit Parade)	1
Norway (VG-lista)	1
South Africa (RiSA)	1
Sweden (Kvällstoppen)	1
Sweden (Tio i Topp)	1
UK Singles Chart	2
US Billboard Hot 100	1
US Cash Box Top 100	1
Venezuela (Radio Caracas)	5

Chart (1972–73)	Peak position
Australian Singles Chart	49
Irish Singles Chart	10

Chart (1986)	Peak position
UK Singles Chart	87

=== Year-end charts ===
Chart (1962)	Rank
US Billboard Hot 100	7
US Cash Box Top 100	15

== Sylvie Vartan version (in French) ==
"Le Loco-motion"

Single by Sylvie Vartan

from the album Sylvie
- Language: French
- B-side: "Comme l'été dernier"
- Released: October 1962
- Recorded: Summer–Fall 1962
- Genre: Pop
- Length: 2:15
- Label: RCA Victor
- Songwriters: Gerry Goffin, Carole King, Georges Aber

Sylvie Vartan singles chronology
"Madison Twist" (1962)	"Le Loco-motion" (1962)	"Moi je pense encore à toi" (1962)

Music video
- "Le Loco-motion" (live) on YouTube

In 1962, the French singer Sylvie Vartan recorded a cover of "The Loco-Motion" in French, called "Le Loco-motion". Vartan's version went to number 1 in France on October 13, 1962, and remained there for one week.

=== Track listing ===
7-inch EP: "Le Loco-motion" / "Aussi loin que j'irai" / "Oui c'est lui" / "Comme l'été dernier" RCA Victor 76.593, 86.593 (1962, France)

A1. "Le Loco-motion" ("The Loco-Motion")
A2. "Oui c'est lui" ("He Is the Boy")
B1. "Comme l'été dernier" ("Dancing Party")
B2. "Aussi loin que j'irai"

=== Charts ===
Chart (1962)	Peak position
Belgium (Ultratop 50 Wallonia)	6
France	1

== Jackie Lee version ==
In 1963 Jackie Lee and the Raindrops recorded and performed a version of The Loco-Motion for a scene in the film Just For You (directed by Douglas Hickox; the film was released in June 1964). This version was recorded for Oriole Records but issued by Decca on the film's soundtrack album. A Cinebox 16mm film was made for video jukeboxes featuring the same scene as used in the film.

== Grand Funk Railroad version ==
"The Loco-Motion"
- US vinyl single, whose artwork was also used for French and German releases

Single by Grand Funk Railroad

from the album Shinin' On
- B-side: "Destitute and Losin'"
- Released: February 1974
- Recorded: 1973
- Genre: Hard rock
- Length: 2:46
- Label: Capitol 3840
- Songwriters: Gerry Goffin, Carole King
- Producer: Todd Rundgren

Grand Funk Railroad singles chronology
"Walk Like a Man" (1973)	"The Loco-Motion" (1974)	"Shinin' On" (1974)

=== Background ===
American rock band Grand Funk Railroad recorded a cover version of the song in 1974, produced by Todd Rundgren. The decision to play the song came about after guitarist Mark Farner was heard singing the song in the studio. The Grand Funk version of the song featured guitars, several layers of harmony, and heavy drums.

During the 2000s, this version of the song was featured in advertisements for the Japanese technology and communications company SoftBank, featuring the pop group SMAP. SMAP also used the song on their television variety show SMAP×SMAP for a music video, singing along to the original Grand Funk recording rather than covering it.

The song is available as downloadable content for Rock Band 3.

=== Reception ===
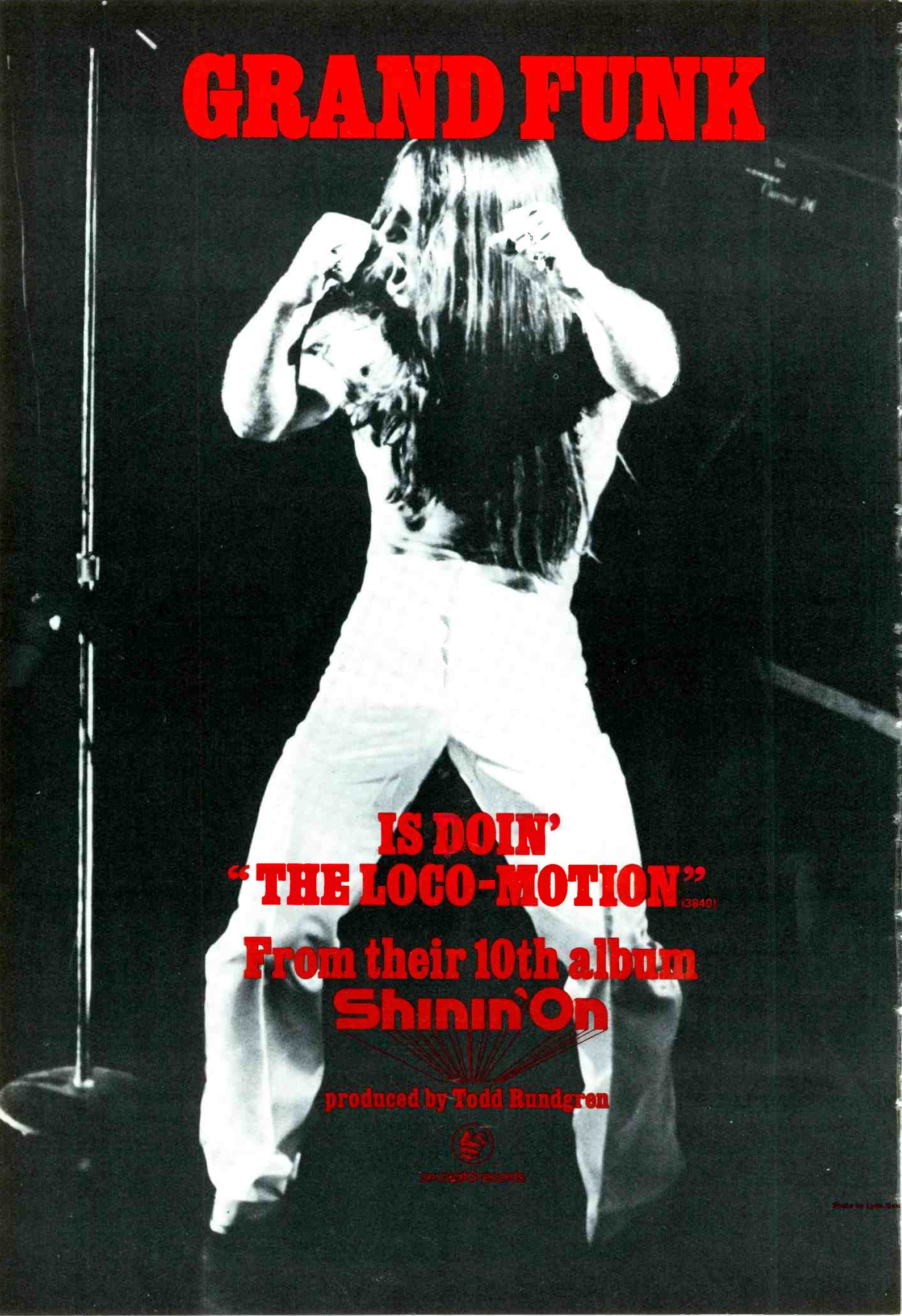
Cashbox advertisement, March 2, 1974

"The Loco-Motion" appeared on Grand Funk Railroad's album Shinin' On and was released as a single in February 1974, eventually peaking at No. 1 on the U.S. Billboard Hot 100 chart for two weeks in May 1974. It also reached number 5 in Australia, peaked at number 1 in Canada, and reached number 11 in West Germany.

John Lennon, during a 1974 interview discussing recent hit songs, said "I like "Loco-Motion," thought that was a great record."

In the 2004 edition of The Rolling Stone Album Guide, Village Voice Media music critic Nick Catucci called the cover "embarrassing".

=== Weekly charts ===
Chart (1974–1975)	Peak position
Australian Singles Chart	5
Austrian Singles Chart	7
Canada RPM Top Singles	1
US Billboard Hot 100	1
US Cash Box Top 100	1
West German Singles Chart	10

=== Year-end charts ===
Chart (1974)	Rank
Australia (Kent Music Report)	47
Canada	5
US Billboard Hot 100	6
US Cash Box Top 100	13

== Ritz version ==
"Locomotion"

Single by Ritz

from the album Puttin' On The Ritz
- B-side: "Lazy Love"
- Released: June 15, 1979
- Genre: Pop, disco
- Length: 3:45
- Label: Epic
- Songwriters: Gerry Goffin, Carole King
- Producer: Ken Gold

Ritz singles chronology
"Movie Star" (1979)	"Locomotion" (1979)

Disco group Ritz covered this song in 1979. Their version peaked at number one in New Zealand for seven non-consecutive weeks in 1980, becoming the most successful record of the year there. The Ritz version was also a top-20 hit in Australia, Sweden, and Switzerland. The live arrangement that Kylie Minogue performed on her Golden Tour and Summer 2019 Tour is based upon this recording.

=== Charts ===
==== Weekly charts ====
Chart (1979–1980)	Peak position
Australia (Kent Music Report)	12
New Zealand (Recorded Music NZ)	1
Sweden (Sverigetopplistan)	18
Switzerland (Schweizer Hitparade)	6

==== Year-end charts ====
Chart (1980)	Position
Australia (Kent Music Report)	49
New Zealand (RIANZ)	1

== Carole King version ==
"Locomotion"

Song by Carole King

from the album Pearls: Songs of Goffin and King
- Released: June 1980
- Recorded: January 1980
- Studio: Pecan Street Studios, Austin, Texas, US
- Genre: Pop
- Length: 2:30
- Label: Capitol
- Songwriters: Gerry Goffin, Carole King
- Producers: Carole King, Mark Hallman

Carole King recorded a version of the song under the title "Locomotion" for her 1980 studio album Pearls: Songs of Goffin and King. The album peaked at No. 44 and spawned King's last top 40 hit to-date, "One Fine Day", which would reach No. 12 on the charts. King also sings the song on her live album The Living Room Tour, released in 2005. The album peaked at No. 17 on the US album chart on July 30, 2005.

== Dave Stewart and Barbara Gaskin version ==
"The Locomotion"

Single by Dave Stewart and Barbara Gaskin
- B-side: "Make Me Promises"
- Released: May 1986
- Recorded: 1986
- Genre: Synth-pop
- Length: 4:00
- Label: Broken
- Songwriters: Gerry Goffin, Carole King
- Producer: Dave Stewart

Dave Stewart and Barbara Gaskin singles chronology
"I'm In A Different World" (1984)	"The Locomotion" (1986)	"Subterranean Homesick Blues" (1990)

In May 1986, Dave Stewart and Barbara Gaskin released a cover version of the song as a single. The duo had scored a UK No. 1 hit back in 1981 with their cover of "It's My Party" but had achieved little success since. For this 1986 single, they embarked on a big promotional push in an attempt to gain a second significant hit. The single, however, stalled at No. 70 on the UK charts in June that year.

== Emerson, Lake & Powell version ==
Emerson, Lake & Powell self-titled album contained, in some USA and Japanese versions, an instrumental version of "The Loco-Motion."

== Kylie Minogue version ==
"Locomotion"
- Artwork for Australian single

Single by Kylie Minogue

from the album Kylie
- B-side: 1987 version: "Getting Closer"; "Glad to Be Alive" 1988 version: "I'll Still Be Loving You"
- Released: July 13, 1987
- Recorded: 1987; 1988
- Studio: Platinum Studios (Melbourne) (1987 version); PWL Studios (London) (1988 version)
- Genre: Dance-pop; hi-NRG
- Length: 3:08 (7” mix): 3:13 (album version); 3:16 (Australian version)
- Label: Mushroom; PWL; Geffen
- Songwriters: Gerald Goffin; Carole King
- Producers: Mike Duffy (1987 version); Stock Aitken Waterman (1988 version)

Kylie Minogue singles chronology
"Locomotion" (1987)	"I Should Be So Lucky" (1987)

Alternative cover
- Single sleeve for most international editions, featuring still frames from the music video

Kylie Minogue singles chronology
"Got to Be Certain" (1988)	"The Loco-Motion" (1988)	"Je ne sais pas pourquoi" (1988)

Music video
- "The Loco-motion" on YouTube

=== Background ===
Australian pop singer Kylie Minogue released a cover version of the song in July 1987 as her debut single, under the title "Locomotion". After an impromptu performance of the song at an Australian rules football charity event for Fitzroy Football Club with the cast of the Australian soap opera Neighbours, Minogue signed a record deal with Mushroom Records to release the song as a single. Initially recorded in a big band style, the project was radically reoriented by producer Mike Duffy, who was on loan to Mushroom from Pete Waterman's UK company PWL. Duffy recorded a whole new backing track, inspired by the hi-NRG pop of Dead or Alive, but retained Minogue's original vocal. This version was released on July 13, 1987, in Australia, where it became one of the biggest selling Australian records of the 1980s. It was later released the same year in New Zealand, Italy, and Sweden.

The success of the song in her home country resulted in Minogue's signing a record deal with PWL Records in London and to working with the successful team Stock Aitken & Waterman (SAW). The producers decided to totally re-record Minogue's version of the song, with Pete Waterman slating her original Australian recording, which he claimed was poorly produced. Original producer Mike Duffy instead blamed the decision to re-record on Waterman's alleged wish to claim the prestige and royalties that looked set to roll in from the track's looming placement of the soundtrack of the 1988 film Arthur 2: On the Rocks, starring Dudley Moore and Liza Minnelli. On July 28, 1988, the re-recorded version produced by SAW was released worldwide with the title "The Loco-Motion". This release, also a major success, reached the top five in Canada, the United Kingdom, and the United States. This version of the track substitutes the Australian (and Commonwealth) term railway for the American term railroad in the song's lyrics.

=== Reception ===
The 1987 "Locomotion" release was a huge hit in Minogue's native Australia, reaching number one on the Kent Music Report singles chart and remaining there for seven weeks. The 1988 release of the song in the United Kingdom debuted and peaked at number two on the UK Singles Chart—the highest entry on the UK charts by a female artist. It remained in the number two position for four weeks before falling to number three. With sales of 440,000 it was the eleventh best selling single of the year. The song became Minogue's third top five single in the UK and remains one of her most successful single releases to date.

During late 1988, Minogue traveled to the United States to promote "The Loco-Motion", where she did many interviews and performances on American television. The song was used in the comedy film Arthur 2: On the Rocks. "The Loco-Motion" debuted at number 80 on the U.S. Billboard Hot 100 and later peaked at number three for two weeks. The song was Minogue's second single to chart in the U.S., but her first to reach the top ten. To this day, the song remains as her highest-charting single in the United States; however, her second overall and most recent song to reach the top ten, 2002's "Can't Get You Out of My Head", ended up outselling "The Loco-Motion". In Canada, the song reached number one on The Record's chart. In 2023, Robert Moran of Australian daily tabloid newspaper The Sydney Morning Herald ranked the song as Minogue's 17th best song (out of 183), describing it "a surprisingly gritty sex track built on chugging synths and girl-group harmonies". The song reached number one in South Africa, and remained at the top for 11 weeks.

=== Music video ===
The music video for "Locomotion" was directed by Chris Langman and filmed at Essendon Airport and the ABC studios in Melbourne, Australia. Choreographer Tania Lacy conceived the video's dance sequences around locomotive movements. For the international release of "The Loco-Motion", footage from the Australian music video was re-edited twice; one version for the US market and another for the European market. Near the end of 1988, the song was nominated for 'Best International Single' at the Canadian Music Industry Awards.

=== Formats and track listings ===
These are the formats and track listings of major single releases of "The Loco-motion".

==== "The Loco-motion" (1988) ====
- UK 7-inch vinyl single
1. "The Loco-motion" (7-inch mix) – 3:07
2. "I'll Still Be Loving You" – 3:45
- UK 12-inch vinyl single
1. "The Loco-motion" (Kohaku Mix) – 5:59
2. "I'll Still Be Loving You" – 3:45
- UK 12-inch remix
1. "The Loco-motion" (Sankie Mix) – 6:35
2. "I'll Still Be Loving You" – 3:45
- US 7-inch vinyl single/cassingle
1. "The Loco-motion" (LP version) – 3:13
2. "I'll Still Be Loving You" – 3:45
- US 12-inch vinyl single
1. "The Loco-motion" (Kohaku Mix) – 5:59
2. "The Loco-motion" (Sankie Mix) – 6:35
3. "The Loco-motion" (LP version) – 3:13
4. "I'll Still Be Loving You" – 3:45
- West German CD single
1. "The Loco-motion" (Kohaku Mix) – 5:59
2. "I'll Still Be Loving You" – 3:45

==== iTunes digital release (2009) ====
- "Locomotion" (Australian version)
1. "Locomotion" – 3:11
2. "Locomotion" (Chugga-Motion Mix) – 7:38
3. "Locomotion" (The Girl Meets Boy Mix) – 3:12
4. "Getting Closer" – 3:33
5. "Getting Closer" (UK mix) (previously unreleased) – 4:01
6. "Getting Closer" (UK instrumental) (previously unreleased) – 4:01
7. "Getting Closer" (Extended Oz Mix) – 4:09
8. "Getting Closer" (Extended Oz Instrumental) (previously unreleased) – 4:09
9. "Glad to Be Alive" – 3:42
- "The Loco-Motion"
1. "The Loco-Motion" (7-inch mix) – 3:13
2. "The Loco-Motion" (The Kohaku Mix) – 5:57
3. "The Loco-Motion" (7-inch instrumental) (previously unreleased) – 3:13
4. "The Loco-Motion" (7-inch backing track) (previously unreleased) – 3:13
5. "I'll Still Be Loving You" – 3:50
6. "I'll Still Be Loving You" (instrumental) (previously unreleased) – 3:50
7. "I'll Still Be Loving You" (backing track) (previously unreleased) – 3:50
- "The Loco-Motion" (Remix)
1. "The Loco-Motion" (The Sankie Mix) – 6:36
2. "The Loco-Motion" (Alternative Sankie Mix) – 6:56
3. "The Loco-Motion" (12-inch Master) – 9:13
4. "The Loco-Motion" (Album Instrumental) (previously unreleased) – 3:15
5. "The Loco-Motion" (Album Backing Track) (previously unreleased) – 3:15
6. "The Loco-Motion" (Oz Tour Mix) – 5:41
7. "The Loco-Motion" (Oz Tour Backing Track) (previously unreleased) – 5:41

=== Charts and sales ===
==== Weekly charts ====
1987–1989 chart performance for "The Loco-Motion"
Chart (1987–1989)	Peak position
Australia (Australian Music Report)	1
Austria (Ö3 Austria Top 40)	3
Belgium (Ultratop 50 Flanders)	3
Belgium (Ultratop 50 Wallonia)	2
Canada Retail Singles (The Record)	1
Canada Top Singles (RPM)	5
Canada Dance/Urban (RPM)	1
Denmark (IFPI)	5
Europe (European Hot 100 Singles)	1
Europe (European Airplay Top 50)	1
Finland (Suomen virallinen lista)	1
France (SNEP)	5
Iceland (RÚV)	2
Ireland (IRMA)	1
Japan (Oricon Singles Chart)	68
Luxembourg (Radio Luxembourg)	1
Netherlands (Single Top 100)	9
Netherlands (Dutch Top 40)	5
New Zealand (Recorded Music NZ)	8
Norway (VG-lista)	8
Portugal (AFP)	2
Quebec (ADISQ)	2
South Africa (Springbok Radio)	1
Switzerland (Schweizer Hitparade)	2
UK Singles (Official Charts)	2
US Billboard Hot 100	3
US Dance Club Songs (Billboard)	12
US Adult Contemporary (Billboard)	39
US Cash Box Top 100	4
US Contemporary Hit Radio (Radio & Records)	3
West Germany (GfK)	3

2012 chart performance for "The Loco-Motion"
Chart (2012)	Peak position
Japan Hot 100 (Billboard)	66

==== Year-end charts ====
1987 year-end chart performance for "Locomotion"
Chart (1987)	Rank
Australia (Australian Music Report)	1

1988 year-end chart performance for "The Loco-Motion"
Chart (1988)	Rank
Belgium (Ultratop)	27
Canada Top Singles (RPM)	61
Canada Dance/Urban (RPM)	1
Europe (European Airplay Top 50)	25
Europe (European Hot 100 Singles)	34
Netherlands (Dutch Top 40)	71
Netherlands (Single Top 100)	60
UK Singles (OCC)	11
US Billboard Hot 100	49
West Germany (Media Control)	35

1989 year-end chart performance for "The Loco-Motion"
Chart (1989)	Rank
Europe (European Hot 100 Singles)	97

==== Certifications and sales ====
Certifications for "The Loco-Motion"
Region	Certification	Certified units/sales
Australia (ARIA)	Platinum	70,000^{^}
France (SNEP)	Silver	250,000^{*}
Japan	—	24,530
New Zealand (RMNZ)	Gold	15,000^{‡}
United Kingdom (BPI)	Silver	434,000
United States (RIAA)	Gold	500,000^{^}
^{*} Sales figures based on certification alone.^{^} Shipments figures based on certification alone.^{‡} Sales+streaming figures based on certification alone.

== Atomic Kitten version ==
English girl group Atomic Kitten recorded a cover of the song for the soundtrack of the 2000 film Thomas and the Magic Railroad, which would feature in the end credits. The cover would eventually be included in their 2005 compilation album Access All Areas: Remixed and B-Sides.
