= One Fine Day (song) =

1963 single by the Chiffons

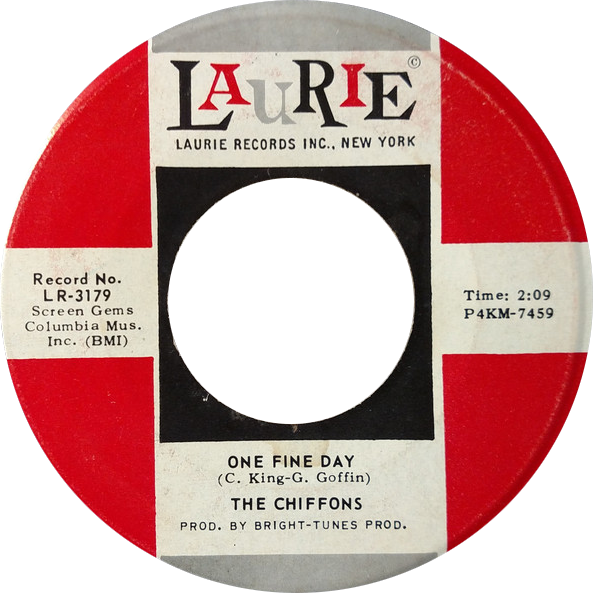
- Side A of the US single

Single by the Chiffons

from the album One Fine Day
- B-side: "Why Am I So Shy"
- Released: May 1963
- Recorded: 1963
- Genre: Pop
- Length: 2:07
- Label: Laurie
- Songwriters: Carole King, Gerry Goffin
- Producer: The Tokens

The Chiffons singles chronology
"Lucky Me" (1963)	"One Fine Day" (1963)	"A Love So Fine" (1963)

"One Fine Day" is a song written by Gerry Goffin and Carole King. It first became a popular hit in the summer of 1963 for American girl group the Chiffons, who reached the top five on the Billboard Hot 100 chart. In 1980, King recorded it herself and charted at No. 12 on the Hot 100 with her version, becoming her last top 40 hit. The song has subsequently been covered by numerous artists over the years.

== The Chiffons version ==
=== Background ===
Goffin and King were inspired by the title of the aria "Un bel di vedremo" from the Puccini opera Madama Butterfly. Intended for Little Eva, "One Fine Day" was prepped as a demo by Goffin and King with King providing a guide vocal but – despite a propulsive piano riff courtesy of King – Goffin and King were unable to construct a viable arrangement and eventually gave up, passing the song to The Tokens who had recently produced the #1 hit "He's So Fine" by The Chiffons for whom it was thought another "fine" song had hit potential. The piano work by King (whose vocal was erased) was retained for The Chiffons' recording and King attended the session at which The Chiffons recorded their vocals. However the Tokens radically re-worked the Goffin/King demo of "One Fine Day" for The Chiffons' version; Gerry Goffin commented that the Tokens "really earned their production credit". The personnel on the original recording included Carl Lynch and Charles Marcy on guitar, Dick Romoff on bass, Artie Kaplan, Sid Jekowsky, and Joe Grimaldi on sax, and Gary Chester and Buddy Saltzman on drums.

=== Reception ===
"One Fine Day" by the Chiffons reached No. 5 on the Billboard Hot 100: its R&B chart peak was No. 6. The single was an international hit charting in the UK (#29), France (#18), and New Zealand (#6). The Chiffons' "One Fine Day" was ranked #460 on Rolling Stone Magazine's list of The 500 Greatest Songs of All Time.

Cash Box described it as "a sizzling, rock-a-twist’er...that the femmes and their ork support belt in ultra-commercial fashion" with "infectious keyboard work."

The Chiffons' placing two "fine" songs in the top ten motivated the Tokens to especially prep the group's next single "A Love So Fine" which only managed a #40 peak.

Billboard named the song #27 on their list of 100 Greatest Girl Group Songs of All Time.

=== Soundtracks ===
The Chiffons' version has made numerous soundtrack appearances including: Fingers (1978), The Hollywood Knights (1980), The Flamingo Kid (1984), Desperately Seeking Susan (European release; the track's classic piano riff opens the film) (1985), A Night in the Life of Jimmy Reardon (1988), The Joy Luck Club (1993), the 1996 film One Fine Day, Riding in Cars with Boys (2001), The Wedding Date (2005), And When Did You Last See Your Father? (2007) and Flipped (2010). The song is also featured at the conclusion of the Pen15 episode "Opening Night" (2020). It was used in The Simpsons episode "Bart the Murderer". The producers had made that episode to spoof Goodfellas and originally wanted to use "Be My Baby" which was in the soundtrack, but changed to "One Fine Day" after being unable to get permission from the Ronettes.

== Carole King version ==
"One Fine Day"

Single by Carole King

from the album Pearls: Songs of Goffin and King
- B-side: "The Rulers of the World"
- Released: May 19, 1980
- Genre: Pop
- Length: 2:30
- Label: Capitol
- Songwriters: Carole King, Gerry Goffin
- Producers: Carole King, Mark Hallman

Carole King singles chronology
"Time Gone By" (1979)	"One Fine Day" (1980)	"Oh No Not My Baby" (1980)

=== Background ===
Carole King had the only major hit remake of her own composition when she recorded "One Fine Day" for her studio album Pearls: Songs of Goffin and King which mostly comprised King's renditions of pop music she had co-written with Gerry Goffin.

=== Reception ===
Prior to the song's official release, Billboard described the backing instruments as "hot and tight" but said that King's voice was too mature to be "believable" in expressing the youthful sentiment of the song. King's version of "One Fine Day" reached No. 12 on the Billboard Hot 100 in the summer of 1980. Her cover of "One Fine Day" was ranked at #73 on Billboard's list of the top 100 hits of 1980;. The single also reached No. 19 on the Cashbox chart. Despite the single's success, it has not been included on King's "best of" compilations.

== Other versions ==
- The French-language rendering of "One Fine Day", "Un beau jour" was a 1963 single release for Jacky Moulière (fr) becoming his most successful single with a peak of #20 on the hit parade for France. The track was also included on Moulière's 1964 self-titled album release.
- Jimmy Fontana ("Una Sola" Italian: album Jimmy Fontana 1963).
- The Fouryo's (nl) ("Op Een Dag" Dutch 1963).
- The Mindbenders cut a version of "One Fine Day" which served as the B-side of their #28 UK hit "Can't Live with You (Can't Live Without You)" (1966).
- Cliff Richard covered the song on his 1967 album Don't Stop Me Now!
- In 1967 Ken Sparkes, then a dee jay at 3AK Radio in Melbourne, recorded a version of "One Fine Day".
- Doris on album Svenssons Doris! (1969).
- Helena Vondráčková ("První krásný den" Czech 1970).
- David Lasley in 1973.
- The Carpenters in 1973.
- The first remake of "One Fine Day" to chart in the US was that by veteran cabaret singer Julie Budd whose disco version – credited to Julie – reached #93 in 1976; Budd's only charting track, "One Fine Day" was produced by top '60s producer Herb Bernstein. Budd's version of "One Fine Day" is featured in the film The Driver (1978).
- "One Fine Day" next charted in the autumn of 1979 for Rita Coolidge whose version, prominently featuring Michael McDonald, reached #66 on the Billboard Hot 100 and #15 on Billboard's Easy Listening chart. Coolidge's version of "One Fine Day" also reached #68 in Australia.
- "One Fine Day" served as the title cut for a 2005 release by Sandy Posey on which she returned to the countrypolitan sound of her own 1960s successes via covers of classic pop hits.
- Natalie Merchant did an acoustic-style remake of the Chiffons' hit for the 1996 film One Fine Day. The romcom featured her song as its theme.
- S Club Juniors recorded a version in 2002 for their debut album, Together.
