= Swinging on a Star =

1944 song by Jimmy Van Heusen and Johnny Burke

Single by Bing Crosby with the Williams Brothers Quartet and John Scott Trotter and His Orchestra

from the album Selections from Going My Way
- Released: April 1944
- Recorded: February 7, 1944
- Genre: Traditional pop
- Label: Decca
- Songwriters: Jimmy Van Heusen; Johnny Burke

Official audio
- " Swinging on a Star" on YouTube

"Swinging on a Star" is an American pop standard with music composed by Jimmy Van Heusen and lyrics by Johnny Burke. It was introduced by Bing Crosby in the film Going My Way (1944), winning an Academy Award for Best Original Song that year, and has been recorded by numerous artists since then. In 2004, it finished at No. 37 in AFI's 100 Years...100 Songs survey of top tunes in American cinema.

== Origins ==
Songwriter Jimmy Van Heusen was at Crosby's house one evening for dinner and to discuss writing a song for Crosby's film project Going My Way. During the meal, Crosby's ten year old son Gary, began complaining about how he did not want to go to school the next day; the singer turned to Gary and said to him, "If you don’t go to school, you might grow up to be a mule." Van Heusen thought this clever rebuke would make a good song for the film. He pictured Crosby, who played a priest, talking to a group of children acting much the same way as his own child had acted that night. Van Heusen took the idea to his partner lyricist Johnny Burke, who approved. They wrote the song.

The first recording of "Swinging on a Star", with Bing Crosby with John Scott Trotter and His Orchestra, took place in Los Angeles on February 7, 1944, and was released as Decca Records on Disc No. 18597 paired with "Going My Way". The song topped the US charts in 1944 and Australian charts in 1945. The Williams Brothers Quartet, including a young Andy Williams, sang backup vocals behind Crosby.

== Composition ==
The lyrics follow the usual verse-refrain format. The length of the composition is unusual: the refrain is just 8 bars in length, whilst the verse is 12 bars.

== Other versions ==
- A 1963 recording by Big Dee Irwin and Little Eva reached No. 38 on the Billboard Hot 100 in the US and No. 7 on the UK Singles Chart in January 1964.
- Dave Van Ronk recorded a version for his 1976 album, Sunday Street.
- The American sitcom Out of This World (1987–1991) used a modified, updated version of "Swinging on a Star" as its theme song.
- Actors Bruce Willis and Danny Aiello perform the song in the 1991 action comedy Hudson Hawk in order to time out a heist their characters pull. They, however, incorrectly cite the length of the song as five minutes, thirty-two seconds as well as sing the verses in the incorrect order.
- In a first-season episode of Sesame Street, Susan sings the song to a trio of Anything Muppets, transforming them into the animals she's singing about with costume elements she has with her.

== Awards and honors ==
- Academy Award for Best Original Song (1944)
- Grammy Hall of Fame (2002)

== See also ==
- List of number-one singles of 1944 (U.S.)
