= Little Eva =

American singer (1943–2003)

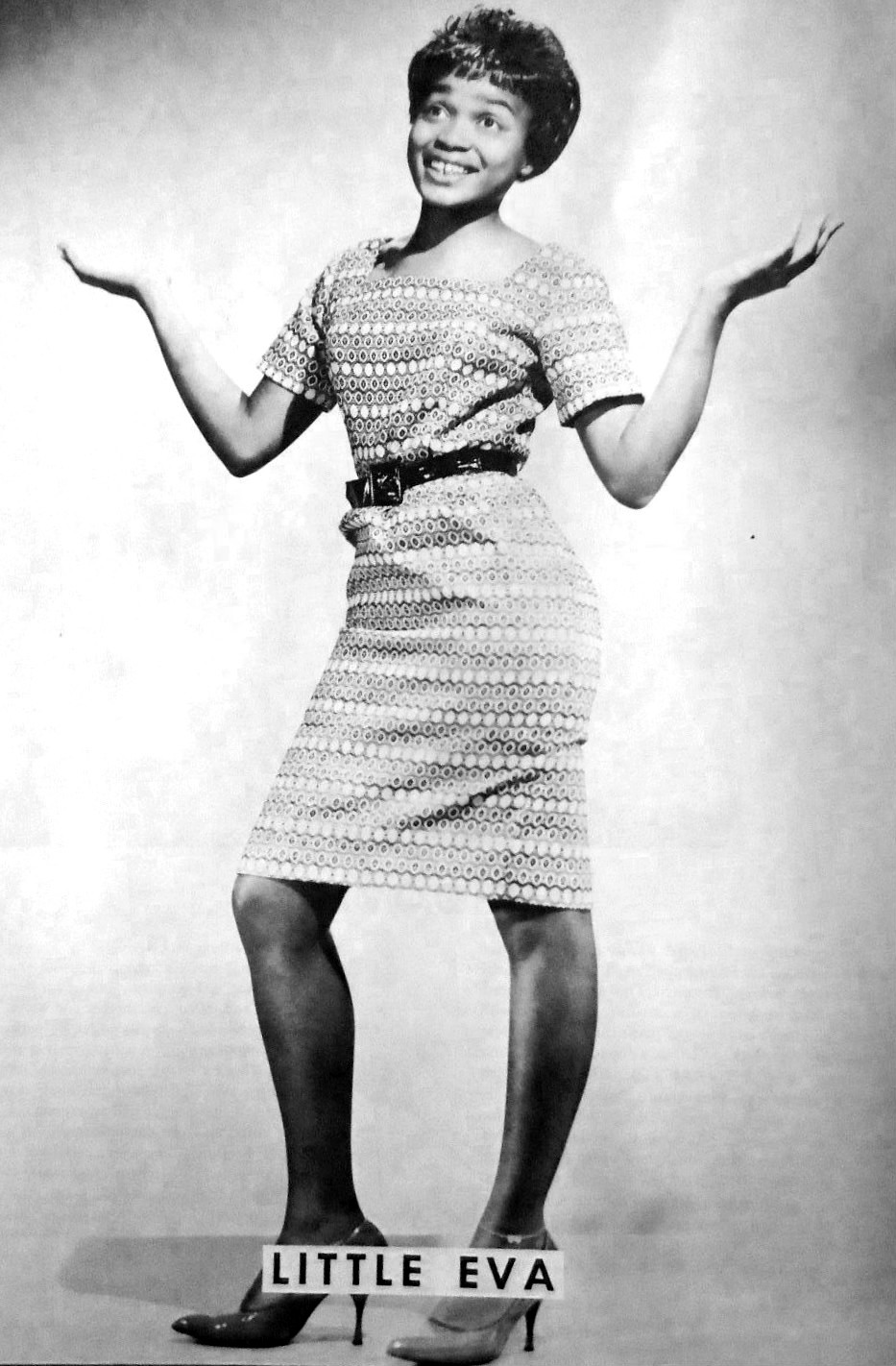
- Little Eva in 1962

Background information
- Born: Eva Narcissus Boyd; June 29, 1943; Belhaven, North Carolina, U.S.
- Died: April 10, 2003 (aged 59) Kinston, North Carolina, U.S.
- Genres: Doo-wop; pop; R&B
- Occupation: Singer
- Years active: 1961–1971; 1987–2001
- Labels: Dimension; Collectables; Amy; Verve; Spring; Malibu

Eva Narcissus Boyd (June 29, 1943 – April 10, 2003), known by her stage name Little Eva, was an American singer best known for her 1962 hit "The Loco-Motion".

== Biography ==
Boyd was born in Belhaven, North Carolina, in 1943 and had twelve siblings. At the age of fifteen, she moved to the Brighton Beach section of Brooklyn, New York. As a teenager, she worked as a maid and earned extra money as a babysitter for songwriters Carole King and Gerry Goffin (including for the young Louise Goffin).

It is often claimed that Goffin and King were amused by Boyd's particular dancing style, so they wrote "The Loco-Motion" for her and had her record it as a demo (the record was intended for Dee Dee Sharp). However, as King said in an interview with NPR and in her "One to One" concert video, they knew she could sing when they met her, and it would be just a matter of time before they would have her record songs they wrote, the most successful being "The Loco-Motion". Music producer Don Kirshner of Dimension Records was impressed by the song and Boyd's voice and had it released. The song reached No. 1 in the United States in 1962. It sold more than one million copies, and was awarded a gold disc. After the success of "The Loco-Motion", Boyd was stereotyped as a dance-craze singer and was given limited material.

The same year, Goffin and King wrote "He Hit Me (And It Felt Like a Kiss)" (performed by the Crystals), after discovering that Boyd was being regularly beaten by her boyfriend. When they inquired why she tolerated such treatment, Boyd replied without batting an eyelid that he hit her because he loved her.

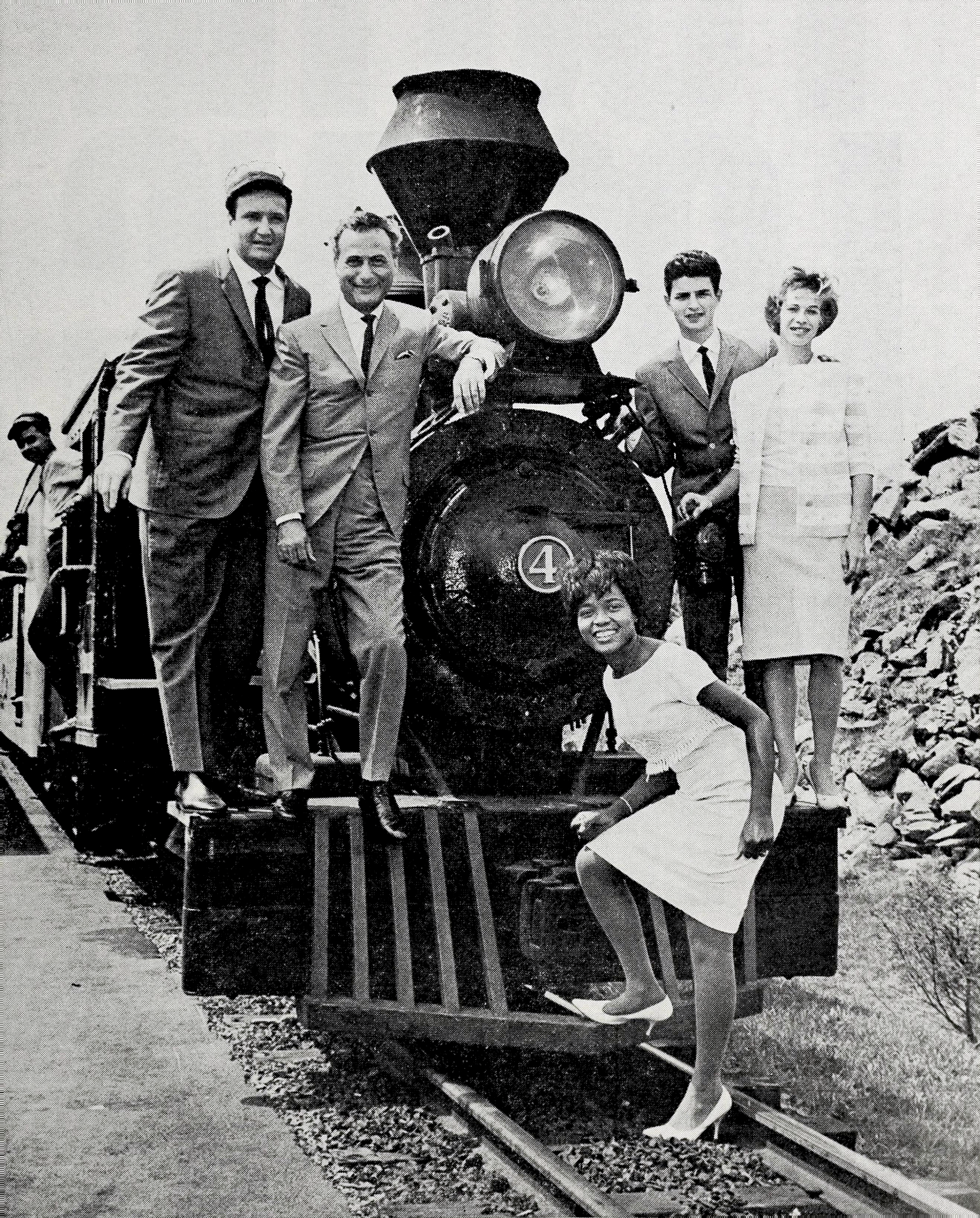
Little Eva, Carole King and Gerry Goffin on the cover of Cash Box, 15 September 1962

Boyd's other single recordings were "Keep Your Hands Off My Baby", "Let's Turkey Trot", and a remake of the Bing Crosby standard "Swinging on a Star", recorded with Big Dee Irwin (though Boyd was not credited on the label). Boyd also recorded the song "Makin' With the Magilla" for an episode of the 1964 Hanna-Barbera cartoon series The Magilla Gorilla Show.

In 1963, American Bandstand signed Boyd with Dick Clark's Caravan of Stars national U.S. tour and she was set to perform for the tour's 15th show, scheduled for the night of November 22, 1963, at the Memorial Auditorium in Dallas, Texas, when suddenly the Friday evening event was cancelled, moments after U.S. President John F. Kennedy was assassinated while touring Dallas in an open car caravan.

Boyd continued to tour and record throughout the sixties, but her commercial appeal plummeted after 1964. She retired from the music industry in 1971. Boyd never owned the rights to her recordings. Although the prevailing rumor in the 1970s was that she had received only $50 for "The Loco-Motion", it seems $50 was actually her weekly salary at the time she made her records (an increase of $15 from what Goffin and King had been paying her as nanny). Penniless, Boyd returned with her three young children to North Carolina, where they lived in obscurity.

Interviewed in 1988 after the success of the Kylie Minogue recording of "The Loco-Motion", Boyd stated that she did not like the new version; however, its then-current popularity allowed her to make a comeback in show business.

== Death ==
Boyd continued performing until she was diagnosed with cervical cancer in October 2001. She died on April 10, 2003, in Kinston, North Carolina, at the age of 59. She was buried in a small cemetery in Belhaven, North Carolina. Boyd's gravesite was sparsely marked until July 2008, when a report by WRAL-TV of Raleigh, North Carolina, highlighted deteriorating conditions at the cemetery and efforts by the city of Belhaven to have it restored. A simple white cross had marked the site until a new gravestone was unveiled in November of that year. Boyd's new grey gravestone has the image of a steam locomotive prominently engraved on the front and the epitaph reads: "Singing with the Angels".

== Singles ==
| Year | Title | Chart positions | | | |
| Year | Title | US | US R&B | UK | CAN |
|---|---|---|---|---|---|
| 1962 | "The Loco-Motion" | 1 | 1 | 2 | 1 |
| 1962 | "Keep Your Hands Off My Baby" | 12 | 6 | 30 | 11 |
| 1963 | "Let's Turkey Trot" | 20 | 16 | 13 | 23 |
| 1963 | "Swinging on a Star" (with Big Dee Irwin) | 38 | — | 7 | — |
| 1963 | "Old Smokey Loco-Motion" | 48 | — | — | 18 |
| 1963 | "What I Gotta Do (To Make You Jealous)" | 101 | — | — | — |
| 1963 | "Let's Start the Party Again" | 123 | — | — | — |
| 1964 | "Makin' with the Magilla" | — | — | — | — |
| 1966 | "Mama Said" | — | — | — | 96 |
| 1966 | "Bend It" | — | — | — | — |
| 1967 | "Just One Word Ain't Enough" | — | — | — | — |
| 1972 | "Loco-Motion" | — | — | 11 | — |
| 1973 | "Loco-Motion" | — | — | — | — |
| 1986 | "Loco-Motion" | — | — | 87 | — |
