= Gerry Goffin =

American lyricist (1939–2014)

Background information
- Born: Gerald Goffin; February 11, 1939; New York City, U.S.
- Died: June 19, 2014 (aged 75) Los Angeles, California, U.S.
- Occupations: Lyricist; songwriter
- Years active: 1959−2002
- Labels: Adelphi; UAR; Manticore
- Spouses: Carole King (m. 1959; div. 1969); Barbara Behling; Ellen Minasian; Michele Conaway (m. 1995)

Gerald Goffin (February 11, 1939 – June 19, 2014) was an American lyricist. Collaborating initially with his first wife, Carole King, he co-wrote many international pop hits of the early and mid-1960s, including the US No. 1 hits "Will You Love Me Tomorrow", "Take Good Care of My Baby", "The Loco-Motion", and "Go Away Little Girl". It was later said of Goffin that his gift was "to find words that expressed what many young people were feeling but were unable to articulate."

After he and King divorced, Goffin wrote with other composers, including Barry Goldberg and Michael Masser, with whom he wrote "Theme from Mahogany (Do You Know Where You're Going To)" and "Saving All My Love for You", also No. 1 hits. During his career, Goffin wrote more than 114 Billboard Hot 100 hits, including eight chart-toppers, and 72 UK hits. He was inducted into the Rock and Roll Hall of Fame in 1990, with Carole King.

== Biography ==
=== Early life and education ===
Goffin was born in Brooklyn and grew up in Queens, New York City. As a boy, he wrote lyrics in his head, as a game. In his teen years, he worked for his grandfather, a Russian-born Jewish furrier. He enlisted in the Marine Corps Reserve after graduating from Brooklyn Technical High School. After a year at the U.S. Naval Academy as a member of the Class of 1961, he resigned from the Navy to study chemistry at Queens College.

=== Partnership with Carole King ===
At college he met Carol Joan Klein, who had started writing songs under the name Carole King. They began collaborating on songwriting, with King writing the music and Goffin the lyrics, and began a relationship. When King became pregnant, they left college and married in August 1959 when he was 20 and she was 17. Goffin began working with a chemicals manufacturer, and wrote the lyrics for King's 1959 single "Oh Neil", an answer song to her friend Neil Sedaka's "Oh! Carol". Goffin added the words to the tune written by Sedaka and Howard Greenfield, who both worked under Don Kirshner at the Aldon music publishing company in Manhattan; the single's B-side, "A Very Special Boy", was a Goffin-King composition. Although the record was not a hit, the couple both secured contracts to write songs professionally at Aldon.

Goffin at first worked with other writers including Barry Mann and Jack Keller, but he and Carole King soon established themselves as a successful writing team. The partnership's breakthrough hit was "Will You Love Me Tomorrow", for which Goffin wrote the lyrics. The song was recorded by the Shirelles and went to number one on the Billboard Hot 100 in January 1961. Goffin and King formed one of the most successful songwriting partnerships of the period, with hit songs including: "Take Good Care of My Baby" (a hit for Bobby Vee), "Halfway to Paradise" (Tony Orlando, Billy Fury), "The Loco-Motion" (Little Eva, and later Grand Funk Railroad and Kylie Minogue), "Go Away Little Girl" (Steve Lawrence, and later Donny Osmond), "Don't Say Nothin' Bad (About My Baby)" (the Cookies), "It Might as Well Rain Until September" (Carole King), "One Fine Day" (the Chiffons), "Up on the Roof" (the Drifters and later James Taylor), "I'm into Something Good" (Herman's Hermits, but recorded first by Earl-Jean McCrea under the name Earl-Jean), "Don't Bring Me Down" (the Animals), "Oh No Not My Baby" (Maxine Brown, and later Rod Stewart), "Goin' Back" (Dusty Springfield, The Byrds), "(You Make Me Feel Like) A Natural Woman" (Aretha Franklin), and "Pleasant Valley Sunday" (the Monkees). Goffin and King also wrote several songs jointly with record producer Phil Spector. In 1963, John Lennon was quoted as saying that he wanted Paul McCartney and himself to become "the Goffin-King of England".

In 1964, Goffin fathered a daughter through an affair with singer Jeanie Reavis (whose recording of "I'm into Something Good" preceded the better-known version by Herman's Hermits), but he and King remained together for several years before divorcing in 1969. Goffin later said in an interview in Vanity Fair that he "wanted to be a hippie — grew my hair long — and Carole did it modestly...And then I started taking LSD and mescaline. And Carole and I began to grow apart because she felt that she had to say things herself. She had to be her own lyricist." According to King's memoir, Goffin suffered from mental illness following ingestion of LSD, eventually undergoing treatment with lithium and electroshock therapy, and was diagnosed with manic depression. His drug use affected his health, and he was hospitalized for a time.

=== Other collaborations ===
Goffin also worked successfully with other composers in the early 1960s, including Barry Mann ("Who Put the Bomp (in the Bomp, Bomp, Bomp)") and Jack Keller ("Run to Him").

After splitting from King, Goffin released a solo album in 1973, It Ain't Exactly Entertainment, but it was not successful, and he began working with other composers, including Russ Titelman, Barry Goldberg, and then Michael Masser. He and Masser won an Academy Award nomination in 1976 for the theme to the film Mahogany, sung by Diana Ross; and also wrote "Saving All My Love for You", a worldwide hit for Whitney Houston, "Tonight, I Celebrate My Love", "Miss You Like Crazy" and "Nothing's Gonna Change My Love for You". Goffin and Masser also received a Golden Globe nomination for "So Sad the Song" from the 1976 Gladys Knight film Pipe Dreams.

Goffin co-wrote three songs for the soundtrack to Grace of My Heart, a 1996 movie whose principal character's life paralleled that of Carole King in many ways.

=== Later life ===
Goffin and King were inducted together into the Songwriters Hall of Fame in 1987, and the Rock and Roll Hall of Fame in 1990.

In 1996 he released his second solo album, Back Room Blood, which he said was inspired by his anger at conservative gains in the 1994 congressional elections. The album was mostly co-written with Barry Goldberg, but included two songs co-written with Bob Dylan, "Tragedy of the Trade" and "Masquerade". Goffin described Dylan as "sort of like a god to me". Goffin was one of the first people to take notice of Kelly Clarkson's talent and had hired her to do demo work before she auditioned for American Idol in 2002.

Goffin and his fourth wife, Michele, attended opening night of the musical Beautiful, which depicted his marriage to Carole King.

=== Personal life ===
Gerry Goffin was married to Carole King between 1959 and 1969; they had two daughters, singer-songwriter Louise Goffin and Sherry Goffin Kondor. Goffin also had a daughter, Dawn, with Jeanie Reavis (Earl-Jean McCrea) in 1964. He married Barbara Behling in the early 1970s and had a son, Jesse Dean Goffin, in 1976. They divorced later that decade. Goffin then married songwriter Ellen Minasian in the 1980s and had one daughter, Lauren, in 1984. Following their divorce, he married actress Michele Conaway (the sister of actor Jeff Conaway) in 1995.

=== Death ===
Goffin died on June 19, 2014, in Los Angeles, California, at the age of 75. His death was announced by his wife, Michele. No cause was specified. He left behind a wife, one son, four daughters, and six grandchildren.

=== Tributes ===
On hearing of his death, Carole King said that Goffin was her "first love" and had a "profound impact" on her life." She went on to say, "His words expressed what so many people were feeling but didn't know how to say... Gerry was a good man and a dynamic force, whose words and creative influence will resonate for generations to come." Barry Goldberg, who wrote many later songs with Goffin, said "Gerry was one of the greatest lyricists of all time and my true soul brother."

== See also ==
- List of songs with lyrics by Gerry Goffin

== Discography ==
=== Albums ===
- It Ain't Exactly Entertainment (1973), Adelphi Records Inc – AD4102 (double vinyl album)
- Back Room Blood (1996), Genes Records – GCD 4132
- It Ain't Exactly Entertainment Demo & Other Sessions (2010), Big Pink – BIG PINK 92 (CD album)

=== Singles and EPs ===
- It's Not the Spotlight (1973), Adelphi Records Inc – AD-452
- Back Room Blood (The CD Single) (1996), Genes Records – GCD 4532
