= Grand Funk Railroad discography =

Cataloging of published recordings by Grand Funk Railroad

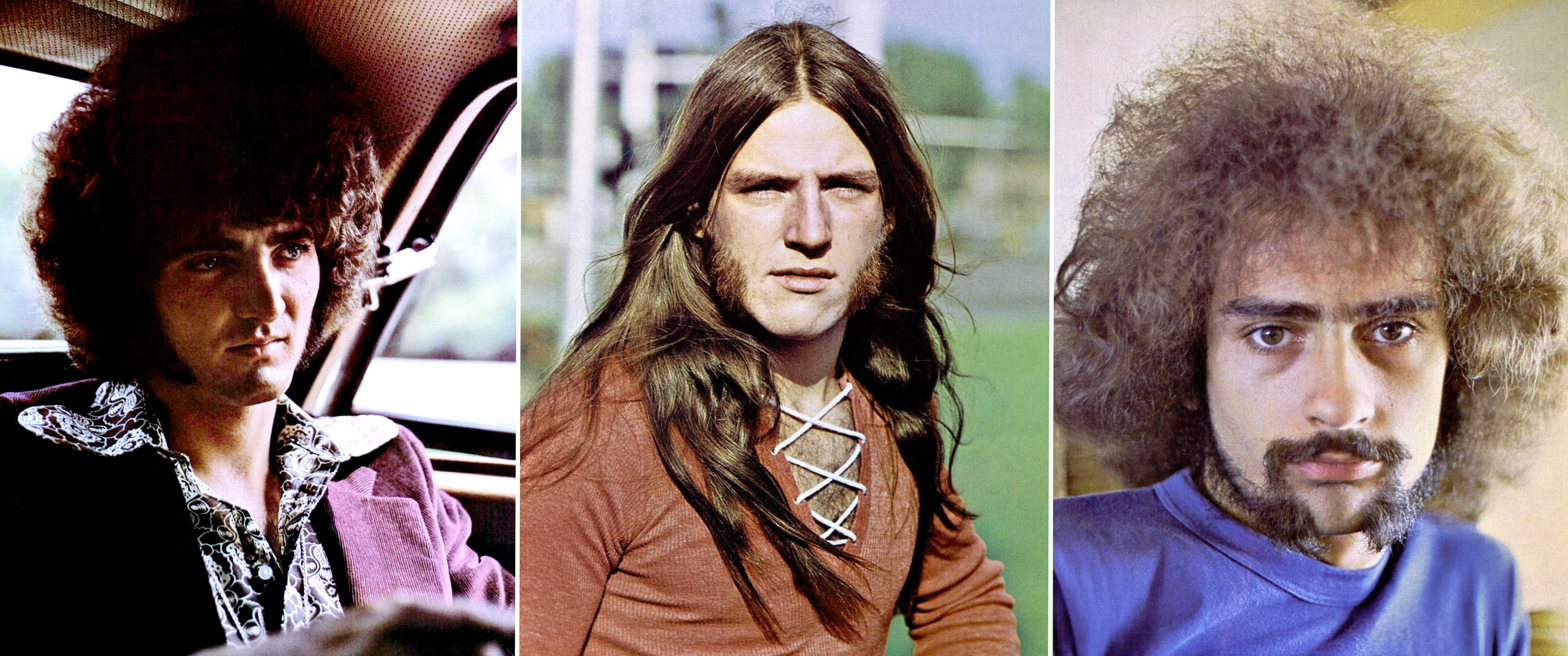
- The original trio in 1971. Left to right: Don Brewer, Mark Farner and Mel Schacher.
- Studio albums: 13
- Live albums: 4
- Compilation albums: 8
- Singles: 25

Grand Funk Railroad (shortened to Grand Funk) is an American hard rock band formed in 1969. The band is most notable for their peak in popularity during the 1970s. Grand Funk has released 13 studio albums, 4 live albums, 8 compilation albums and 25 singles.

== Albums ==
=== Studio albums ===
Year	Album details	Peak chart positions					Certifications (sales threshold)
Year	Album details	US	AUS	CAN	JPN	NOR	Certifications (sales threshold)
1969	On Time: Release date: August 1969; Label: Capitol (ST-307); Format: LP, 8-track, cassette, CD	27	14	34	44	—	US: Gold
1969	Grand Funk: Release date: December 1969; Label: Capitol (SKAO-406); Format: LP, 8-track, cassette, CD	11	13	9	26	—	US: Platinum
1970	Closer to Home: Release date: June 1970; Label: Capitol (SKAO-471); Format: LP, 8-track, cassette, CD	6	9	5	30	—	US: 2× Platinum
1971	Survival: Release date: April 1971; Label: Capitol (SW-764); Format: LP, 8-track, cassette, CD	6	9	5	7	—	US: Platinum
1971	E Pluribus Funk: Release date: November 1971; Label: Capitol (SW-854); Format: LP, 8-track, cassette, CD	5	11	3	15	—	US: Platinum
1972	Phoenix: Release date: September 1972; Label: Capitol (SMAS-11099); Format: LP, 8-track, cassette, CD	7	13	8	21	20	US: Gold
1973	We're an American Band: Release date: July 1973; Label: Capitol (SMAS-11207); Format: LP, 8-track, cassette, CD	2	27	4	10	12	US: Platinum
1974	Shinin' On: Release date: March 1974; Label: Capitol (SWAE-11278); Format: LP, 8-track, cassette, CD	5	43	2	24	10	US: Gold
1974	All the Girls in the World Beware!!!: Release date: December 1974; Label: Capitol (SO-11356); Format: LP, 8-track, cassette, CD	10	66	20	38	—	US: Gold
1976	Born to Die: Release date: January 1976; Label: Capitol (ST-11482); Format: LP, 8-track, cassette, CD	47	—	31	35	—	
1976	Good Singin', Good Playin': Release date: August 9, 1976; Label: MCA (MCA-2216); Format: LP, 8-track, cassette, CD	52	—	48	—	—	
1981	Grand Funk Lives: Release date: September 28, 1981; Label: Full Moon (FMH 3625); Format: LP, 8-track, cassette	149	—	—	—	—	
1983	What's Funk?: Release date: 1983; Label: Warner Bros. (9 23750–1); Format: LP, cassette	—	—	—	—	—	
"—" denotes releases that did not chart.

=== Live albums ===
Year	Album	Peak chart positions					Certifications
Year	Album	US	AUS	CAN	JPN	UK	Certifications
1970	Live Album: Released: September, 1970; Label: Capitol Records; Format: LP, 8-track, cassette, CD	5	15	5	10	29	US: 2× Platinum
1975	Caught in the Act: Released: 1975; Label: Capitol; Format: LP, 8-track, cassette, CD	21	—	33	31	—	
1997	Bosnia: Released: October 21, 1997; Label: Capitol; Format: CD, Digital	—	—	—	—	—	
2002	Live: The 1971 Tour: Released: June 4, 2002; Label: Capitol; Format: CD, Digital	—	—	—	—	—	
"—" denotes releases that did not chart.

=== Compilation albums ===
Year	Album	Peak chart positions	Certifications
Year	Album	US	Certifications
1972	Mark, Don & Mel: 1969–71: Released: 1972; Label: Capitol Records; Format: LP, 8-track, cassette, CD	17	US: Gold
1972	Mark, Don & Terry 1966–67: Released: 1972; Label: ABKCO Records (Terry Knight & The Pack tracks w/Farner & Brewer); Format: LP, 8-track, cassette	—	
1976	Grand Funk Hits: Released: 1976; Label: Capitol; Format: LP, 8-track, cassette	126	
1989	Heavy Hitters!: Released: 1989; Label: Capitol Records CDL-57244, Format: CD, cassette	—	
1990	The Best of Grand Funk: Released: 1990; Label: CEMA; Format: CD, cassette	—	
1991	Capitol Collectors Series: Released: February 26, 1991; Label: Capitol; Format: CD, cassette	—	US: Gold
1991	More of the Best: Released: June 1, 1991; Label: Rhino; Format: CD, cassette	—	
1999	Thirty Years of Funk: 1969-1999: Released: June 29, 1999; Label: Capitol; Format: CD, Digital	—	
2002	Classic Masters: Released: July 30, 2002; Label: Capitol; Format: CD, Digital	—	
2002	Trunk of Funk: Released: August 27, 2002; Label: Capitol; Format: CD, Digital	—	
2006	Greatest Hits: Released: April 4, 2006; Label: Capitol; Format: CD, Digital	—	
2014	10 Great Songs The Millennium Collection: 20th Century Masters: Released: April 1, 2014; Label: Capitol; Format: CD, Digital	—	
"—" denotes releases that did not chart.

== Singles ==
Year	Title	Peak positions					B-sides	Certifications	Album
Year	Title	US	CAN	GER	AUS	UK	B-sides	Certifications	Album
1969	"Time Machine"	48	43	—	—	—	"High on a Horse"		On Time
1969	"Mr. Limousine Driver"	97	92	—	—	—	"High Falootin' Woman"		Grand Funk
1969	"Inside Looking Out"	—	—	—	—	40	"Paranoid"		Grand Funk
1970	"Heartbreaker"	72	58	—	—	—	"Please Don't Worry"		On Time
1970	"Sin's a Good Man's Brother"	—	—	—	—	—	"Nothing is the Same"		Closer To Home
1970	"Closer to Home"	22	21	—	—	—	"Aimless Lady"		Closer To Home
1970	"Mean Mistreater"	47	30	—	—	—	"Mark Say's Alright"		Live Album
1971	"Feelin' Alright"	54	20	—	—	—	"I Want Freedom"		Survival
1971	"Gimme Shelter"	61	49	42	—	—	"I Can Feel Him in the Morning"		Survival
1971	"People, Let's Stop the War"	105*	—	—	—	—	"Save the Land"		E Pluribus Funk
1971	"Footstompin' Music"	29	43	—	83	—	"I Come Tumblin'"		E Pluribus Funk
1972	"Upsetter"	73	89	—	—	—	"No Lies"		E Pluribus Funk
1972	"Rock 'N Roll Soul"	29	37	—	—	—	"Flight of the Phoenix"		Phoenix
1973	"We're an American Band"	1	4	—	87	—	"Creepin'"	US: Platinum	We're an American Band
1973	"Walk Like a Man"	19	16	—	—	—	"The Railroad"		We're an American Band
1974	"The Loco-Motion"	1	1	10	5	57 (Note: Chart position is from the official UK "Breakers List".)	"Destitute And Losin'"		Shinin' On
1974	"Shinin' On"	11	13	—	—	—	"Mr. Pretty Boy"		Shinin' On
1974	"Some Kind of Wonderful"	3	6	—	39	—	"Wild"	US: Platinum	All the Girls in the World Beware!!!
1975	"Bad Time"	4	3	—	—	—	"Good and Evil"		All the Girls in the World Beware!!!
1975	"Take Me"	53	58	—	—	—	"Genevieve"		Born to Die
1976	"Sally"	69	35	—	—	—	"Love Is Dyin'"		Born to Die
1976	"Can You Do It"	45	75	—	—	—	"1976"		Good Singin', Good Playin'
1977	"Just Couldn't Wait"	—	—	—	—	—	"Out to Get You"		Good Singin', Good Playin'
1981	"Y.O.U."	125**	—	—	—	—	"Testify"		Grand Funk Lives
1982	"Stuck in the Middle"	108	—	—	—	—	"No Reason Why"		Grand Funk Lives
"—" denotes releases that did not chart. US Charts are Billboard unless otherwise noted. * Cash Box Singles Chart. ** Record World Singles Chart.
