= Grand Funk Hits =

Greatest hits album by Grand Funk Railroad
- Released: November 1976
- Recorded: 1972–1975
- Genre: Rock
- Length: 33:42
- Label: Capitol 11579

Grand Funk Railroad chronology
Good Singin', Good Playin' (1976)	Grand Funk Hits (1976)	Grand Funk Lives (1981)

Professional ratings
Review scores
Source	Rating
Allmusic	3/5 stars
Christgau's Record Guide	B+

Grand Funk Hits is a greatest hits compilation by Grand Funk Railroad originally released in 1976 on Capitol Records (LP-ST-11579). It peaked at number 126 on the Billboard 200.

The songs included on the album were all recorded after the band parted ways with manager Terry Knight in 1972. Grand Funk added keyboardist Craig Frost to its lineup later that year and moved away from a power trio to a lighter and more commercial sound. A compilation album of earlier songs, entitled Mark, Don & Mel: 1969–71, had been released in 1972.

== Track listing ==
1. "Rock 'N Roll Soul" (Mark Farner) - 3:28
2. "We're an American Band" (Don Brewer) * - 3:23
3. "Walk Like a Man" (Mark Farner/Don Brewer) * - 3:22
4. "Bad Time" (Mark Farner) # - 2:54
5. "Some Kind of Wonderful" (John Ellison) # - 3:48
6. "The Loco-Motion" (Gerry Goffin/Carole King) * - 2:44
7. "Shinin' On" (Mark Farner/Don Brewer) * - 3:24
8. "Sally" (Mark Farner) # - 3:12
9. "Take Me" (Don Brewer/Craig Frost) # - 4:04
10. "To Get Back In" (Mark Farner) * - 3:53
- Produced by Grand Funk
- Produced by Todd Rundgren *
- Produced by Jimmy Ienner #

== Personnel ==
- Mark Farner – lead vocals & guitars
- Craig Frost – keyboards & background vocals
- Mel Schacher – bass & background vocals
- Don Brewer – lead vocals, drums & percussion
