= Classic Masters (Grand Funk Railroad album) =

Greatest hits album by Grand Funk Railroad
- Released: July 30, 2002
- Genre: Hard rock
- Length: 1:10:49
- Label: Capitol
- Producer: Grand Funk Railroad, Terry Knight

Grand Funk Railroad chronology
Live: The 1971 Tour (2002)	Classic Masters (2002)	Greatest Hits (2006)

Professional ratings
Review scores
Source	Rating
AllMusic	4/5 stars

Classic Masters is a compilation album from Grand Funk Railroad. Released in 2002, it is one in a series by Capitol Records.

It was intended to replace 1991's Capitol Collectors Series compilation, although track-wise they are identical except for one song. Both albums have 15 tracks, but Classic Masters includes "Take Me" whereas Collectors Series has "Inside Looking Out". The only other difference is the order of the tracks on the disc.

Classic Masters is 24-bit remastered whereas Collectors Series is credited as being mastered from the original stereo mixes. Classic Masters should be considered the better of the two CDs sound wise, but the Collectors Series does have better liner notes.

This CD as a sampler to the recently reissued/remastered Grand Funk catalogue on Capitol.

== Track listing ==
All songs written and composed by Mark Farner except where noted.

1. "We're An American Band" (We're An American Band) (Don Brewer) – 3:26
2. "Time Machine" (On Time) – 3:45
3. "Walk Like a Man" (We're An American Band) (Brewer/Farner) – 4:05
4. "Some Kind of Wonderful" (All The Girls In The World Beware!!!) (John Ellison) – 3:22
5. "Gimme Shelter" (Survival) (Mick Jagger, Keith Richards) – 6:18
6. "Shinin' On" (Shinin' On) (Brewer/Farner) – 5:56
7. "Heartbreaker" (On Time) – 6:34
8. "Rock & Roll Soul" (Phoenix) – 3:29
9. "The Loco-Motion" (Shinin' On) (Gerry Goffin/Carole King) – 2:46
10. "Footstompin' Music" (E Pluribus Funk) – 3:46
11. "Mean Mistreater" (Live Album) – 4:55
12. "Feelin' Alright" (Survival) (Dave Mason) – 4:26
13. "Take Me" (Born To Die) (Brewer/Craig Frost) – 5:06
14. "Bad Time" (All The Girls of The World Beware!!!) – 2:56
15. "I'm Your Captain/Closer to Home" (Closer To Home) – 9:59

== Personnel ==
- Grand Funk – producer
- Jimmy Ienner – producer
- Terry Knight – producer
- Todd Rundgren – producer
- Cheryl Pawelski – compilation producer
- David K. Tedds – compilation producer
- Robert Vosgien – remastering
