= Thirty Years of Funk: 1969–1999 =

Thirty Years of Funk: 1969-1999

Box set by Grand Funk Railroad
- Released: June 29, 1999
- Genre: Hard rock
- Length: 3:43:52
- Label: Capitol Records
- Producer: Grand Funk Railroad, Terry Knight

Grand Funk Railroad chronology
Bosnia (1997)	Thirty Years of Funk: 1969-1999 (1999)	Live: The 1971 Tour (2002)

Professional ratings
Review scores
Source	Rating
AllMusic	4/5 stars

Thirty Years of Funk: 1969–1999 (also known as The Anthology) is a 1999 box set by Grand Funk Railroad, containing three new songs and several previously unreleased songs.

== Track listing ==
All songs written by Mark Farner, except where noted.

=== Disc one ===
1. "Getting into the Sun" — The Pack* — 4:45
2. "Can't Be Too Long (Faucet)" — The Pack* — 6:00
3. "Got This Thing on the Move" (Mono) — The Pack* — 3:17
4. "Time Machine" — 3:44
5. "High on a Horse" — 2:55
6. "Mr. Limousine Driver" — 4:25
7. "Sin's a Good Man's Brother" — 4:49
8. "Aimless Lady" — 3:29
9. "Mean Mistreater" — 4:27
10. "I'm Your Captain (Closer to Home)" — 10:00
11. "Are You Ready" (Live) — 3:44
12. "Paranoid" (Live) — 6:40
13. "Inside Looking Out" (Live)* (John Lomax, Alan Lomax, Eric Burdon, Chas Chandler) — 16:25

=== Disc two ===
1. "Feelin' Alright" (Dave Mason) — 4:26
2. "Gimme Shelter" (Mick Jagger/Keith Richards) — 6:20
3. "I Can Feel Him in the Morning" (Don Brewer, Farner) — 7:14
4. "I Can't Get Along with Society"* — 4:42
5. "Upsetter" — 4:29
6. "Loneliness" — 8:38
7. "Trying to Get Away" — 4:11
8. "Walk Like a Man (You Can Call Me Your Man)" (Brewer, Farner) — 4:05
9. "Creepin'" — 7:02
10. "We're an American Band" (Brewer) — 3:27
11. "Hooray"* — 4:06
12. "The End"* (Brewer, Farner) — 4:11
13. "To Get Back In" — 3:56
14. "Destitute & Losin'"* — 7:02

=== Disc three ===
1. "Shinin' On" (Brewer, Farner) — 5:57
2. "The Loco-Motion" (Gerry Goffin, Carole King) — 2:47
3. "Some Kind of Wonderful" (John Ellison) — 3:22
4. "Bad Time" — 2:55
5. "Footstompin' Music" (Live) — 4:08
6. "Rock 'n Roll Soul" (Live) — 4:00
7. "Heartbreaker" (Live) — 7:26
8. "Take Me" — 5:10
9. "Sally" — 3:16
10. "Love Is Dyin'" — 4:14
11. "Can You Do It" (Richard Street, T. Gordy) — 3:17
12. "Pass It Around" (Brewer, Farner) — 5:00
13. "Crossfire" — 4:21
14. "Queen Bee" — 3:14
15. "We Gotta Get Out of This Place" (Live)* (Barry Mann, Cynthia Weil) — 5:14
16. "Pay Attention to Me"++ — 3:21
17. "All I Do"++ — 3:30
18. "In the Long Run"++ — 4:12

*: Previously unreleased
++: Newly recorded for this release

== Personnel ==
- Mark Farner – guitar, harmonica, percussion, keyboards, vocals
- Craig Frost – keyboards, vocals
- Mel Schacher – bass guitar
- Dennis Bellinger – bass guitar, vocals
- Don Brewer – percussion, drums, vocals, photography
- Jimmy Hall – harmonica
- Donna Hall – backing vocals
- David K. Tedds – compilation producer
- Grand Funk Railroad – producer
- Terry Knight – producer
- Lisa Reddick – producer
- John Rhys – producer
- Ron Nevison – engineer, mixing
- John Hendrickson – mixing
- Jimmy Romeo – engineer
- Evren Göknar – mastering
- Sam Gay – creative director
