= Greatest Hits (Grand Funk Railroad album) =

2006 greatest hits album by Grand Funk Railroad

Greatest hits album by Grand Funk Railroad
- Released: April 4, 2006
- Recorded: 1969–1975
- Genre: Rock
- Length: 1:09:38
- Label: Capitol 63707

Grand Funk Railroad chronology
Classic Masters (2002)	Greatest Hits (2006)

Professional ratings
Review scores
Source	Rating
AllMusic	4.5/5 stars
The Encyclopedia of Popular Music	3/5 stars

Greatest Hits is a greatest hits album by Grand Funk Railroad, released in 2006.

== Track listing ==
All songs written and composed by Mark Farner except where noted.

1. "We're an American Band" (Don Brewer) – 3:26
2. "Time Machine" – 3:45
3. "Walk Like a Man" (Brewer/Farner) – 4:05
4. "Some Kind of Wonderful" (John Ellison) – 3:23
5. "Shinin' On" (Brewer/Farner) – 5:56
6. "Heartbreaker" – 6:34
7. "Rock & Roll Soul" – 3:29
8. "The Loco-Motion" (Gerry Goffin/Carole King) – 2:46
9. "Footstompin' Music" – 3:46
10. "Mean Mistreater" (Live) – 4:56
11. "Take Me" (Brewer/Craig Frost) – 5:06
12. "Bad Time" – 2:56
13. "I'm Your Captain" – 9:59
14. "Inside Looking Out" (Eric Burdon/Chas Chandler) – 9:31
