= Caught in the Act (Grand Funk Railroad album) =

Live album by Grand Funk Railroad
- Released: August 1975
- Recorded: February 1975
- Genre: Hard rock
- Length: 74:15
- Label: Capitol
- Producers: Jimmy Ienner, Shannon Ward, Bryan Kelley

Grand Funk Railroad chronology
All the Girls in the World Beware!!! (1974)	Caught in the Act (1975)	Born to Die (1976)

Professional ratings
Review scores
Source	Rating
AllMusic	4/5 stars

Caught in the Act is Grand Funk Railroad's second live album and was released in August 1975 by Capitol Records as a double album. It was recorded live on tour in 1975 and features "The Funkettes" — Lorraine Feather and Jana King (Giglio).

Early pressings of the album (including record-club pressings) simply state the band's name as "Grand Funk" on the front cover and spine, but have the full name on the record labels.

The 2003 re-mastered version of this release has a total time of 79:08, and was squeezed down to one disc. The 2:47 "Introduction" is gone, but "T.N.U.C" and "Gimme Shelter" are lengthened. Audience interaction and applause is shortened throughout to compensate. The missing "Introduction" is included as a hidden track at the end of "Some Kind of Wonderful" on the 2003 re-mastered version of All the Girls in the World Beware!!!.

== Track listing ==
Side one

1. "Footstompin' Music" (from E Pluribus Funk) (Mark Farner) – 4:07
2. "Rock & Roll Soul" (from Phoenix) (Farner) – 4:04
3. "Closer to Home" (from Closer to Home) (Farner) – 7:08

Side two

1. "Heartbreaker" (from On Time) (Farner) – 7:22
2. "Some Kind of Wonderful" (from All the Girls in the World Beware!!!) (John Ellison) – 4:14
3. "Shinin' On" (from Shinin' On) (Farner, Don Brewer) – 5:31
4. "The Loco-Motion" (from Shinin' On) (Gerry Goffin, Carole King) – 3:21

Side three

1. "Black Licorice" (from We're an American Band) (Farner, Brewer) – 4:27
2. "The Railroad" (from We're an American Band) (Farner) – 6:13
3. "We're an American Band (from We're an American Band) (Brewer) – 3:38
4. "T.N.U.C." (from On Time) (Farner) – 9:32

Side four

1. "Inside Looking Out" (from Grand Funk) (John Lomax, Alan Lomax, Eric Burdon, Bryan "Chas" Chandler) – 12:24
2. "Gimme Shelter" (from Survival) (Mick Jagger, Keith Richards) – 7:00

== Personnel ==
- Mark Farner – guitar, harmonica, vocals; organ on "Footstompin' Music"
- Craig Frost – percussion, keyboards, backing vocals
- Mel Schacher – bass guitar, backing vocals
- Don Brewer – drums, percussion, vocals

Funkettes Group

- Lorraine Feather – backing vocals
- Jana Giglio – backing vocals

2003 Remaster

- David K. Tedds – produced & compiled for reissue by
- Kevin Flaherty – supervising A&R producer
- Evren Göknar – mastering engineer
- Kenny Nemes – project manager
- Michelle Azzopardi – creative direction
- Neil Kellerhouse – art direction, design
- Steve Roeser – liner notes
- Brendan Gormley – editorial supervision
- Bryan Kelley – production
- Shannon Ward – production

== Charts ==
Chart (1975)	Peak position
US Top LPs & Tape (Billboard)	21
