= Capitol Collectors Series (Grand Funk Railroad album) =

Compilation album by Grand Funk Railroad
- Released: February 26, 1991
- Recorded: June 1969 – November 1974
- Genre: Rock
- Length: 75:47
- Label: Capitol

Grand Funk Railroad chronology
What's Funk? (1983)	Capitol Collectors Series (1991)	Bosnia (1997)

Professional ratings
Review scores
Source	Rating
AllMusic	4/5 stars

Capitol Collector Series is a compilation album from Grand Funk Railroad released in 1991. It was the first compilation covering the bulk of the band's career on Capitol Records. The songs are arranged chronologically.

In January 2002, the album was certified Gold by the RIAA.

== Track listing ==
All songs written and composed by Mark Farner except where noted.

1. "Time Machine" – 3:45
2. "Heartbreaker" – 6:35
3. "Inside Looking Out" (Eric Burdon/Chas Chandler) – 9:33
4. "Closer to Home/I'm Your Captain" – 10:10
5. "Mean Mistreater" – 5:03
6. "Feelin' Alright" (Dave Mason) – 4:26
7. "Gimme Shelter" (Mick Jagger/Keith Richards) – 6:17
8. "Footstompin' Music" – 3:47
9. "Rock & Roll Soul" – 3:26
10. "We're an American Band" (Don Brewer) – 3:27
11. "Walk Like a Man (You Can Call Me Your Man)" (Brewer/Farner) – 4:06
12. "The Loco-Motion" (Gerry Goffin/Carole King) – 2:58
13. "Shinin' On" (Brewer/Farner) – 5:56
14. "Some Kind of Wonderful" (John Ellison) – 3:17
15. "Bad Time" – 2:53
