= Bosnia (album) =

Live album by Grand Funk Railroad
- Released: October 21, 1997
- Recorded: April 20, 1997
- Venue: The Palace of Auburn Hills (Michigan)
- Genre: Rock
- Length: 99:33
- Label: Capitol

Grand Funk Railroad chronology
Capitol Collectors Series (1991)	Bosnia (1997)	Thirty Years of Funk: 1969–1999 (1999)

Professional ratings
Review scores
Source	Rating
Allmusic	2.5/5 stars

Bosnia is a live recording by the American rock band Grand Funk Railroad. The concert was a benefit performance for the nation of Bosnia and Herzegovina. It was recorded live 20 April 1997 at The Palace of Auburn Hills in Auburn Hills, Michigan.

Special guest performers included Peter Frampton, Alto Reed, Paul Shaffer, and the Detroit Symphony Orchestra.

The band later claimed that Capitol released it without the band members' knowledge or consent.

== Track listing ==
All songs written and composed by Mark Farner except where noted.

=== Disc one ===
1. "2001: A Space Odyssey" (Richard Strauss) – 1:25
2. "Are You Ready" – 3:26
3. "Rock 'N Roll Soul" – 3:50
4. "Footstompin' Music" – 4:19
5. "Time Machine" – 3:17
6. "Paranoid" / "Sin's a Good Man's Brother" / "Mr. Limousine Driver" Medley – 7:17
7. "Heartbreaker" – 7:38
8. "Aimless Lady" – 3:53
9. "T.N.U.C." – 7:25
10. "Inside Looking Out" (Eric Burdon/Chas Chandler) – 10:22
11. "Shinin' On" (Don Brewer/Farner) – 3:37
12. "The Loco-Motion" (Gerry Goffin/Carole King) – 3:41
13. "We're an American Band" (Brewer) – 3:58

=== Disc Two ===
1. "Overture" (Jimmie Haskell) – 2:59
2. "Mean Mistreater" – 4:26
3. "Some Kind of Wonderful" (John Ellison) – 2:58
4. "To Get Back In" – 4:02
5. "Bad Time" – 2:57
6. "I'm Your Captain (Closer to Home)" – 9:04
7. "Loneliness" – 8:59

== Personnel ==
=== Grand Funk Railroad ===
- Mark Farner – acoustic and electric guitars, vocals, percussion
- Howard Eddy Jr. – keyboards
- Mel Schacher – bass guitar
- Don Brewer – drums, percussion, vocals

=== With ===
- Peter Frampton – guitar
- Alto Reed – saxophone
- Michigan Symphony Orchestra conducted by Paul Shaffer
- Recorded by David Hewitt on Remote Recording Services Silver Truck
