= Live: The 1971 Tour =

Live album by Grand Funk Railroad
- Released: June 4, 2002
- Recorded: 1971
- Genre: Hard rock
- Label: Capitol Records
- Producer: Terry Knight

Grand Funk Railroad chronology
Thirty Years of Funk: 1969–1999 (1999)	Live: The 1971 Tour (2002)	Classic Masters (2002)

Professional ratings
Review scores
Source	Rating
Allmusic	2.5/5 stars

Live: The 1971 Tour is a live album from Grand Funk Railroad which was recorded over several performances during the tour promoting the Survival album in 1971 but not released until 2002.

== Track listing ==
All selections composed by Mark Farner, except where otherwise noted.

1. Intro (Also sprach Zarathustra) - 1:39: Date/venue not listed.
2. "Are You Ready" - 3:11: Recorded at The Syndrome, Wabash Avenue, Chicago, Illinois on May 1, 1971.
3. "Footstompin' Music" - 5:24: Recorded at The Cobo Arena, Jefferson Ave, Detroit, Michigan on April 29, 1971.
4. "Paranoid" - 6:03: Recorded at The Cobo Arena, Jefferson Ave, Detroit, Michigan on April 29, 1971.
5. "I'm Your Captain/Closer to Home" - 5:48: Recorded at Shea Stadium, Roosevelt Avenue, Flushing, New York on July 9, 1971.
6. "Hooked on Love" - 2:45: Recorded at Shea Stadium, Roosevelt Avenue, Flushing, New York on July 9, 1971.
7. "Get it Together - 2:46: Recorded at Shea Stadium, Roosevelt Avenue, Flushing, New York on July 9, 1971.
8. "T.N.U.C" - 17:12: Recorded at The Cobo Arena, Jefferson Ave, Detroit, Michigan on April 29, 1971.
9. "Inside-Looking Out" (John Lomax, Alan Lomax, Eric Burdon, Bryan "Chas" Chandler) - 15:30: Recorded at The Cobo Arena, Jefferson Ave, Detroit, Michigan on April 29, 1971.
10. "Gimme Shelter" (Mick Jagger, Keith Richards) - 8:44: Recorded at Shea Stadium, Roosevelt Avenue, Flushing, New York on July 9, 1971.
11. "Into the Sun" - 9:50: Recorded at The Cobo Arena, Jefferson Ave, Detroit, Michigan on the April 30, 1971.

== Personnel ==
Grand Funk Railroad

- Mark Farner – guitar, organ, harmonica, percussion, vocals
- Don Brewer – drums, vocals
- Mel Schacher – bass, percussion

2002 Remaster

- David K. Tedds – produced & compiled by
- Cheryl Pawelski – supervising A&R producer
- Jimmy Hoyson – mixing
- Evren Göknar – 24-bit remastering
- Mike Glines – Pro Tools guy
- Kenny Nemes – project manager
- Michelle Azzopardi – art direction
- Neil Kellerhouse – design
- Steve Roeser – liner notes
- Frank Collura – A&R production
- Lee Lodyga – A&R production
- Brendan Gormley – editorial supervision
- Bryan Kelley – production
- Barrie Smithers – production
- Shannon Ward – production
