= Monumental Funk =

Studio album by Grand Funk Railroad
- Released: 1974
- Genre: Hard rock
- Label: Quadisco Records Inc

Professional ratings
Review scores
Source	Rating
Allmusic	4/5 stars

Monumental Funk is an unofficial archival release (bootleg) recorded by Mark Farner and Don Brewer in the late 1960s. It was released in 1974 by Quadico under the name of the duo's then-successful band Grand Funk Railroad.

The album is credited to guitarist Farner and drummer Brewer, and conspicuously very careful not to actually say "Grand Funk" anywhere on it -- though the duo is pictured sitting under a sign reading "Grand Junction" inside the gatefold. Farner calls the album a "bootleg" that was originally released by a company called Lucky Eleven, which handled music by their former band Terry Knight and the Pack.

== Track listing ==
1. "We Gotta Have Love" (Mark Farner) - 4:11
2. "Hey Everybody" (Jerry Tuttle) - 3:37
3. "I've Got News for You" (Dick Wagner) - 4:47
4. "Come See About Me" (Holland-Dozier-Holland) - 4:16
5. "Harlem Shuffle" (Bob Relf, Earl Nelson) - 5:22
6. "Love Lights" (Joseph Wade Scott, Deadric Malone) - 7:06

== Personnel ==
- Mark Farner – guitar, harmonica, keyboards, vocals
- Don Brewer – drums, vocals
