= Born to Die (Grand Funk Railroad album) =

Studio album by Grand Funk Railroad
- Released: 14 January 1976
- Length: 48:17
- Label: Capitol Records
- Producer: Jimmy Ienner

Grand Funk Railroad chronology
Caught in the Act (1975)	Born to Die (1976)	Good Singin', Good Playin' (1976)

Singles from Born to Die
- 1. "Take Me"/"Genevieve" Released: January 1976; 2. "Sally"/"Love Is Dyin'" Released: February 1976

Professional ratings
Review scores
Source	Rating
AllMusic	1.5/5 stars

Born to Die is the tenth studio album by American hard rock band Grand Funk Railroad, released in January 1976.

The album's title is considered to be one of the group's more somber, straying away from the upbeat and cocky attitude that was so prevalent on previous albums, such as All the Girls in the World Beware!!! (1974), and focusing on darker musical and lyrical content concerning death, politics, and personal relationships. The title track was written by Farner in memory of his cousin who had died in a motorcycle accident. The more upbeat pop single, "Sally", released on 3 April, was written by Mark Farner for his then love interest, the actress/singer Sally Kellerman.

== Track listing ==
Side one
No.	Title	Writer(s)	Lead Vocals	Length
1.	"Born to Die"	Farner	Farner	5:35
2.	"Dues"	Brewer/Frost	Brewer	5:36
3.	"Sally"	Farner	Farner	3:16
4.	"I Fell for Your Love"	Brewer/Frost	Brewer	4:12
5.	"Talk to the People"	Farner/Frost	Farner	5:33

Side two
No.	Title	Writer(s)	Lead Vocals	Length
6.	"Take Me"	Brewer/Frost	Brewer	5:10
7.	"Genevieve"	Farner/Brewer/Schacher/Frost	Instrumental	6:12
8.	"Love Is Dyin'"	Brewer	Brewer	4:14
9.	"Politician"	Farner	Farner	3:54
10.	"Good Things"	Farner	Farner	4:35
Total length:				47:05

Bonus Tracks - CD Release
No.	Title	Writer(s)	Lead Vocals	Length
11.	"Bare Naked Woman" (Live Rehearsal)	(unknown)	Farner	3:40
12.	"Genevieve" (Live Rehearsal)	Farner/Brewer/Schacher/Frost	Instrumental	6:28

== Personnel ==
- Mark Farner – guitar, vocals
- Craig Frost – keyboards, background vocals
- Mel Schacher – bass
- Don Brewer – drums, percussion, vocals
- Jimmy Hall – saxophone, harmonica
- Donna Hall – background vocals

2002 Remaster

- David K. Tedds – produced & compiled for reissue by
- Kevin Flaherty – supervising A&R producer
- Steve Genewick – bonus track mix engineer
- Evren Göknar – mastering engineer
- Kenny Nemes – project manager
- Michelle Azzopardi – creative direction
- Neil Kellerhouse – art direction, design
- Steve Roeser – liner notes
- Brendan Gormley – editorial supervision
- Bryan Kelley – production
- Shannon Ward – production

== Charts ==
Chart (1976)	Peak position
Canadian Albums (RPM)	31
US Billboard 200	47

Singles

Year	Single	Chart	Position
1976	"Take Me"	Billboard Hot 100	53
1976	"Take Me"	Canada	58
1976	"Sally"	Billboard Hot 100	69
1976	"Sally"	Canada	35
