= I'm Your Captain (Closer to Home) =

Single by Grand Funk Railroad

from the album Closer to Home
- B-side: "Aimless Lady"
- Released: July 1970
- Recorded: March 1970
- Genre: Rock, symphonic rock
- Length: 10:09 (album); 5:31 (single)
- Label: Capitol
- Songwriter: Mark Farner
- Producer: Terry Knight

Grand Funk Railroad singles chronology
"Nothing Is the Same" (1970)	"I'm Your Captain (Closer to Home)" (1970)	"Mean Mistreater" (1970)

"I'm Your Captain (Closer to Home)" is a 1970 song written by American musician Mark Farner and recorded by Grand Funk Railroad as the closing track to their 1970 album Closer to Home. Ten minutes in duration, it is the band's longest studio recording. One of the group's best-known songs, it is composed as two distinct but closely related movements. Its title has been rendered in various ways across many different Grand Funk albums, including "I'm Your Captain", "I'm Your Captain/Closer to Home", "Closer to Home/I'm Your Captain", "Closer to Home (I'm Your Captain)", and "Closer to Home".

The song conveys the pleas of a captain on a troubled sea voyage and facing a mutiny from his crew. Its use of an orchestra during the long repeated refrains of the closing movement served to differentiate it from much of Grand Funk's work. Several interpretations of the song have been given; most revolve around the Vietnam War, and "I'm Your Captain" is popular among veterans of that conflict.

A truncated version of the song was a modest hit single when first released, but the full album track achieved greater airplay on progressive rock radio stations of the time. It has since become a classic rock staple and has appeared on several audience-selected lists as one of the best rock songs of all time.

== Writing and recording ==
The song is composed in the compound binary form that was used for several well-known songs in the late 1960s and early 1970s. The first movement opens with an electric guitar riff from Farner, which aspiring young guitarists of the time learned to play. This soon changes into a strummed acoustic guitar paired with a distinctive lead bass line from Mel Schacher, set against a steady drumbeat from Don Brewer accompanied with occasional wah wah guitar flourishes.

The story ostensibly deals with a ship's captain on a troubled voyage but facing a mutiny from his crew. Farner's vocal begins:

Everybody, listen to me, and return me, my ship
I'm your captain, I'm your captain, although I'm feeling, mighty sick.
I've been lost now, days uncounted ...
And it's months since, I've seen home.
Can you hear me, can you hear me? Or am I ... all alone.

The music has a bass break and then drops down to half time before resuming at its normal tempo. The captain's pleas continue, while the unhappy crew members are approaching the point of murder.

At the 4½-minute mark the song switches to the second movement, which begins with the sounds of waves and gulls. The captain's voice returns, in a manner that suggests that it may now be his ghost:

I'm getting closer to my home ...
I'm getting closer to my home ...

Again the bass line carries the music, with now a flute line accompanying it. Soon, the strings from the orchestra make their entrance, featuring violins, violas, cellos, and basses. The second movement starts at a fairly slow tempo, then launches into a relatively upbeat guitar break before the captain resumes singing. The movement's single lyric repeats over and over as a mantra. Around the 7-minute mark a full orchestra appears to accompany the band. The orchestra eventually overwhelms the captain's voice, to the gradually fading conclusion.

Unusually for him, Farner wrote the lyric of the song first, with the words coming to him in the middle of the night after saying prayers for inspiration to write something meaningful. The chord changes to "I'm Your Captain" came to him the following morning between sips of coffee, and the next day he took it to the band. They immediately liked it and began jamming on it and working out their parts at a local union hall in their hometown of Flint, Michigan where they usually did their rehearsals.

But after a while they had no ending for the second movement. Inspired by groups like The Moody Blues, they came upon the idea of using an orchestra, and hired Tommy Baker, an arranger and trumpet player who was working on the Cleveland television series Upbeat. He suggested they extend the ending so that his orchestral score would have space to develop in, so the band extended the jam on it. Producer Terry Knight brought in the Cleveland Orchestra to record it. The band members never heard the full version until Knight played it for them back in Flint. Farner nearly cried when he heard it, and Brewer has said of their reactions, "We were just like, 'Wow!'" and "Oh my God, it was magnificent."

== Reception ==
Released as a single with the title "Closer to Home", it was modestly successful in early fall 1970, reaching number 21 in Canada and number 22 on the U.S. pop singles chart as the group's first top 40 hit single. It was far more successful on progressive rock radio stations, such as those in New York, where its length and epic feel were an asset and where it became a mainstay that appealed to a broad spectrum of rock fans outside Grand Funk's immediate listener base. Its airplay helped the album reach the Top 10 of the U.S. albums chart within a month of its release.

Decades later, "I'm Your Captain" remains a staple of many classic rock radio stations. It is considered to be the standout track on the Closer to Home album, and considered by both Farner and others to be his best work as a songwriter. With its melodic strengths and dramatic feel, it is often considered one of the best rock songs of all time. In 1988, the listeners of New York rock station WNEW-FM ranked it the 71st best song of all time, while twenty years later in 2008, New York classic rock station Q104.3's listeners ranked it the 112th best song of all time and by 2015 listeners of the same station had voted it up to being the 9th best of all time.

Grand Funk Railroad were consistently despised by the rock critic establishment, and "I'm Your Captain" got some of the same treatment. In the 1979 Rolling Stone Record Guide, critic Dave Marsh relented only slightly by writing, "Wretched was the word to describe Grand Funk's music. Although the group occasionally achieve an interesting song—'I'm Your Captain' was about the best of the early ones ..."

== Themes and interpretations ==
Over the years many interpretations have been posed by listeners of "I'm Your Captain", including the literal one of mutiny on a voyage, but also ones involving drug addiction and ones by those who see resonance in Homer's Odyssey and themes of returning home, such as college students returning from a long semester. Authors have seen the song as an "epic of paranoia and disease" and as a tale of a man who had lost control of his life in a fashion strong enough to invoke childhood nightmares. It has been used as the subtitle for a chapter of a novel dealing with war and addictions. Comparisons have been made to Walt Whitman's poem "O Captain! My Captain!" in its use of the rank to mean Abraham Lincoln.

Farner himself does not explicitly state what the song is about, and indeed prefers that listeners be able to use their own imaginations when listening to songs in general. Nor did the other band members have any real idea of what Farner was getting at; Brewer has said, "I think it can mean a lot of different things to a lot of people." But the most common interpretations and resonances of "I'm Your Captain" revolve around the Vietnam War. The VH1 program Behind the Music said the song "became a subtle anti-war anthem". Lee Andresen, author of Battle Notes: Music of the Vietnam War, sees it as portraying President Richard Nixon as "captain" of the United States, losing popular support for continuing the war. Fellow Flint native Michael Moore remembers hearing it on the radio the day he went to his draft board (where he would file as a conscientious objector), and hoping the I'm getting closer to my home refrains would never end, as he felt America was his home and not Vietnam.

The song also found a following among American personnel in Vietnam, in part because the band's working-class Flint origins were similar to those of many Americans serving in the war. It resonated with them as they tried to stay alive while waiting for the time when they could get closer to home, and then when they were finally returning from the war. It remains quite popular among Vietnam veterans and Farner has played it at several veterans' benefits. Farner visited and performed at The Wall in November 2007, on the 25th anniversary of the memorial's dedication. He later said, "The gig was a great spiritual and emotional experience. The 'Nam vets I had the privilege to speak to were so gracious and personal with me, as if we were relatives getting back together after a long time apart. As you could imagine, it was really hard for me to sing 'I'm Your Captain' because there was a softball stuck in my throat and I couldn't swallow it!" In 2010, Farner sang the song accompanying himself on acoustic guitar at the Vietnam Veterans of America's National Leadership Conference, where he received the organization's President's Award for Excellence in the Arts.

== Later appearances ==
The song has been included on many Grand Funk live albums and compilations since it first appeared, including 1971's Mark, Don and Mel: 1969–71, 1975's Caught in the Act, 1991's Capitol Collectors Series, 1997's Bosnia, Thirty Years of Funk: 1969–1999, 2002's Classic Masters, a bonus track on the 2002 CD reissue of 1971's E Pluribus Funk, the archival Live: The 1971 Tour, and 2006's Greatest Hits.

The song has been a staple of Farner concert performances in the decades since its recording, with the younger generation of concert-goers still knowing all the words. It received standing ovations when Farner played it as part of the third edition of Ringo Starr & His All-Starr Band in 1995, and a similar reaction greeted it during the 1996 reunion tour of Grand Funk Railroad. When the Grand Funk variant without Farner tours, the singing on the song is taken by lead vocalist Max Carl.

The song has been recorded by the German power metal band Helloween as a track on their 1995 CD single "Sole Survivor". An unusual 'performance' of it was an improvised one with altered lyrics by an American Airlines pilot over a plane's PA system while awaiting permission to leave the gate, which drew much applause from passengers.

American radio personality Mark Thompson said in 1999 that the song "will be played for the rest of time." Producer Terry Knight said in 2003 of the song, "I'm humbled by my part in that piece of history. 'Closer to Home' will never die, it'll be around forever." Farner said in 2007, "It's just one of those songs. It fit. Everything about it worked for that time and it still works today."

The song is featured in the 2015 biopic Straight Outta Compton during the first scene with producer Jerry Heller. There is a Grand Funk poster on the wall behind him. However, it is not included in the Straight Outta Compton: Music from the Motion Picture soundtrack album.

In January 2024 the song was used in a television advertisement for Chevrolet Silverado.
