= Survival (Grand Funk Railroad album) =

Studio album by Grand Funk Railroad
- Released: 15 April 1971
- Recorded: March 1–3, 1971
- Studios: Cleveland Recording Company, Cleveland
- Genre: Rock
- Length: 40:55
- Label: Capitol
- Producer: Terry Knight

Grand Funk Railroad chronology
Live Album (1970)	Survival (1971)	E Pluribus Funk (1971)

Singles from Survival
- 1. "Feelin' Alright"/"I Want Freedom" Released: April 1971; 2. "Gimme Shelter"/"I Can Feel Him in the Morning" Released: August 1971

Professional ratings
Review scores
Source	Rating
AllMusic	3/5 stars
Christgau's Record Guide	C
Rolling Stone	2/5 stars

Survival is the fourth studio album by American rock band Grand Funk Railroad, released in April 1971 by Capitol Records. Recorded at Cleveland Recording Company, the album was produced by Terry Knight. Drummer Don Brewer was not happy with the drum sound on the album, due to Knight's insistence of having Brewer cover his drum heads with tea-towels, after seeing Ringo Starr use the technique in the Beatles' film Let It Be (1970).

== Track listing ==
All tracks written by Mark Farner unless noted.

Side one

1. "Country Road" – 4:22
2. "All You've Got Is Money" – 5:16
3. "Comfort Me" – 6:48
4. "Feelin' Alright" (Dave Mason) – 4:27

Side two

1. "I Want Freedom" – 6:19
2. "I Can Feel Him in the Morning" (Don Brewer, Farner) – 7:15
3. "Gimme Shelter" (Mick Jagger, Keith Richards) – 6:29

Bonus Tracks – CD release

1. "I Can't Get Along with Society (Outtake) (2002 Remix)" – 5:41
2. "Jam (Footstompin' Music)" – 4:40
3. "Country Road" (Unedited Original Version) – 7:37
4. "All You've Got is Money" (Unedited Original Version) – 8:18
5. "Feelin' Alright" (Unedited Original Version) – 5:57

== Differences in bonus tracks ==
The bonus tracks on the 2002 reissue labeled "Original Version" have extended sections and extra lyrics compared to the tracks as released on the original LP.

"Feelin' Alright" is a different take of the song, as heard by the different inflections in the vocals, placement of the instruments, and musical differences in the playing. There is also a third verse not in the LP version.

"Footstompin' Music" became a staple at Grand Funk Railroad's concerts, having been recorded at the Survival sessions but not included on the original release. It was brought into their next album setlist, E Pluribus Funk (1971), with a slightly different arrangement and without the word "Jam" on its title. The song is featured on the live albums Caught in the Act (1975), Bosnia (1997), and Live: The 1971 Tour (recorded in 1971, released in 2002).

== Personnel ==
- Mark Farner – vocals, guitar, harmonica, keyboards
- Mel Schacher – bass
- Don Brewer – vocals, drums
- Terry Knight – producer

2002 Remaster

- David K. Tedds – produced & compiled for reissue by
- Kevin Flaherty – supervising A&R producer
- Jimmy Hoyson – bonus track mix engineer
- Evren Göknar – mastering engineer
- Kenny Nemes – project manager
- Michelle Azzopardi – reissue creative direction
- Neil Kellerhouse – reissue art direction, design
- Steve Roeser – liner notes
- Brendan Gormley – editorial supervision
- Bryan Kelley – production
- Shannon Ward – production

== LP extras ==
The original LP release came with 8x10 photos of each of the three bandmembers, in similar poses as the caveman image of the three from the album cover.

== Charts ==
Chart (1971)	Peak position
Australian Albums (Kent Music Report)	9
Canada Top Albums/CDs (RPM)	6
Japanese Albums (Oricon)	7
US Billboard 200	6

== Certifications ==
Region	Certification	Certified units/sales
United States (RIAA)	Platinum	1,000,000^{^}
^{^} Shipments figures based on certification alone.

== Influences ==
The song "Country Road" was covered by the group High Voltage for their 1972 self-titled album.
