= Live Album (Grand Funk Railroad album) =

Live album by Grand Funk Railroad
- Released: November 16, 1970
- Recorded: June 23–25, 1970
- Venue: Florida
- Genre: Hard rock
- Length: 76:42
- Label: Capitol
- Producer: Terry Knight

Grand Funk Railroad chronology
Closer to Home (1970)	Live Album (1970)	Survival (1971)

Singles from Live Album
- 1. "Mean Mistreater"/"Mark Say's Alright" Released: November 23, 1970; 2. "Inside-Looking Out"/"Paranoid" Released: January 1971

Professional ratings
Review scores
Source	Rating
AllMusic	3/5 stars
Christgau's Record Guide	C−
Rolling Stone	3/5 stars

Live Album is the first live album by American hard rock band Grand Funk Railroad, originally released by Capitol Records on November 16, 1970. The first single released from the album, "Mean Mistreater", was released on November 23 and the second, "Inside Looking Out", was released in January 1971.

The album was originally released as a double album on the LP format. Subsequent reissues of the album on the compact disc format have been both double and single disc sets.

== Recording, production, and artwork ==
The album's gatefold cover depicts a photograph of the band at the Atlanta International Pop Festival during the weekend of the 4th of July 1970, but none of the music was actually recorded there. According to the liner notes on the 2002 CD reissue, the album was recorded at the Jacksonville Coliseum on June 23, 1970 with the exception of "Paranoid" and "Inside Looking Out" which were recorded at the West Palm Beach Civic Auditorium on June 24, 1970. "Heartbreaker" is listed as being recorded at 'either Jacksonville or West Palm Beach'. The album also included a promotional poster. A further three tracks ("In Need", "Heartbreaker" and "Mean Mistreater") from The Orlando Sports Center on June 25, 1970 are included as bonus tracks on the Closer to Home 2002 CD.

== Reception ==
Upon the album's release, Live Album was panned by the critics, while becoming commercially successful.

=== Critical ===
The reception of Live Album by music critics upon the album's release were unfavorable. A modern review of the album by James Chrispell for AllMusic stated the opinion that people either loved or hated the album. Chrispell also gave the opinion that Grand Funk Railroad were the most popular live act of their time and said that the concerts were powerful.

=== Commercial and sales ===
Despite the massive dislike of the album by music critics, Live Album became very successful in the United States, peaking at No. 5 on the Billboard 200 and crossed over to the R&B Albums chart at No. 17—the band's only album to do so. The album was so successful that it was certified gold by the Recording Industry Association of America a week after its release and was eventually certified 2x multi-platinum in 1991. Live Album also became the group's first and only release to make the top 40 on the UK Albums Chart, peaking at No. 29. Side two, in particular, featured their two strongest airplay cuts "Heartbreaker" and "Inside-Looking Out". The barely hidden drug references on "Inside-Looking Out" may have not won them favor at Top 40, but it proved perfect for the new burgeoning FM band where the group also probably benefited from, oddly enough, R&B play taking the album to a prideful No. 17 on that chart.

== Track listing ==
"Introduction" and "Words of Wisdom" are spoken-word tracks; consequently, original pressings of Live Album did not list author credits for these tracks. All other tracks are by Mark Farner, except where noted.

=== LP Version ===
==== Side 1 ====
1. "Introduction" – 2:30
2. "Are You Ready?" (from On Time) – 3:34
3. "Paranoid" (from Grand Funk) – 6:20
4. "In Need" (from Grand Funk) – 9:50

==== Side 2 ====
1. "Heartbreaker" (from On Time) – 6:58
2. "Inside Looking Out" (from Grand Funk) (John Lomax, Alan Lomax, Eric Burdon, Bryan "Chas" Chandler) – 12:22

==== Side 3 ====
1. "Words of Wisdom" – 0:55
2. "Mean Mistreater" (from Closer to Home) – 4:40
3. "Mark Says Alright" (Farner, Don Brewer, Mel Schacher) – 5:10
4. "T.N.U.C." (from On Time) – 11:45

==== Side 4 ====
1. "Into the Sun" (from On Time) – 12:10

=== CD reissue ===
On the CD reissue, the order of the songs has been re-sequenced to reflect the order of performance used in the band's 1970 concerts:

1. "Introduction" – 2:27
2. "Are You Ready?" – 3:39
3. "Paranoid" – 7:20
4. "In Need" – 10:58
5. "Heartbreaker" – 7:10
6. "Words of Wisdom" – 0:52
7. "Mean Mistreater" – 4:53
8. "Mark Says Alright" – 5:14
9. "T.N.U.C." – 10:54
10. "Inside Looking Out" – 13:43
11. "Into the Sun" – 11:24

== Personnel ==
- Mark Farner – guitar, piano, harmonica, vocals
- Mel Schacher – bass
- Don Brewer – drums, vocals
- Terry Knight – producer

2002 Remaster

- David K. Tedds – produced & compiled for reissue by
- Kevin Flaherty – supervising A&R producer
- Jimmy Hoyson – bonus track mix engineer
- Evren Göknar – mastering engineer
- Kenny Nemes – project manager
- Michelle Azzopardi – reissue creative direction
- Neil Kellerhouse – reissue art direction, design
- Steve Roeser – liner notes
- Brendan Gormley – editorial supervision
- Bryan Kelley – production
- Shannon Ward – production

== Charts ==
Chart (1970)	Peak position
Canadian Top Albums	5
US Billboard 200	5

Chart (1971)	Peak position
Australian Top 20 Albums	15
UK Albums Chart	29
US R&B Albums	17
