= Grand Funk Lives =

Studio album by Grand Funk Railroad
- Released: September 28, 1981
- Genre: Hard rock; blues rock
- Length: 34:41
- Label: Full Moon
- Producer: Andrew Cavaliere, Bob Destocki, Thom Panunzio

Grand Funk Railroad chronology
Grand Funk Hits (1976)	Grand Funk Lives (1981)	What's Funk? (1983)

Singles from Grand Funk Lives
- 1. "Y.O.U." Released: September 1981; 2. "Stuck in the Middle" Released: December 1981

Professional ratings
Review scores
Source	Rating
AllMusic	4/5 stars
The Rolling Stone Album Guide	1/5 stars

Grand Funk Lives is the twelfth studio album by Grand Funk Railroad. The album was released in 1981 by Full Moon Records. It was their first album since disbanding in 1976. Although known as a reunion album, it did not feature bassist Mel Schacher or keyboard player Craig Frost. The album was the first to feature bassist Dennis Bellinger and the first and only to feature keyboardist Lance Duncan Ong.

The track "Queen Bee" was featured in the 1981 motion picture soundtrack for the animated film Heavy Metal.

== Track listing ==
All songs written and composed by Mark Farner, except where noted.

Side one
No.	Title	Length
1.	"Good Times"	2:05
2.	"Queen Bee"	3:13
3.	"Testify"	2:58
4.	"Can't Be with You Tonight"	3:29
5.	"No Reason Why"	4:47

Side two
No.	Title	Length
6.	"We Gotta Get Out of This Place" (Mann, Weil)	3:55
7.	"Y.O.U."	2:53
8.	"Stuck in the Middle"	3:09
9.	"Greed of Man"	5:00
10.	"Wait for Me"	4:52

== Personnel ==
- Mark Farner – guitar, piano, vocals
- Lance Duncan Ong – keyboards, synthesizer
- Dennis Bellinger – bass, vocals
- Don Brewer – drums, vocals

== Charts ==
Album

Year	Chart	Peak Position
1981	Billboard 200	149

Singles

Year	Single	Chart	Position
1981	"Stuck in the Middle"	Billboard	108
