= Soul Brothers Six =

American rhythm and blues band

- Also known as: John Ellison and the Soul Brothers Six; The Soul Brothers Five
- Origin: Rochester, New York, U.S.
- Genres: R&B, soul, disco
- Years active: 1965–1976
- Label: Atlantic Records
- Past members: John Ellison; Joe Johnson; Sam Armstrong; Charles Armstrong; Moses Armstrong; Harry Armstrong; Gene Armstrong; Vonn Elle Benjamin; Lester Peleman; James Johnson; Charles Pevy; Eddie Reno

The Soul Brothers Six were an American rhythm and blues band formed in Rochester, New York, during the mid-1960s. They are best remembered for their songs "Some Kind of Wonderful", which was later a hit for Grand Funk Railroad and "I'll Be Loving You" which was a hit record on the 1970s Northern soul scene in the UK.

== History ==
The band was originally called the Soul Brothers Five and featured brothers Sam Armstrong, Charles Armstrong, Moses Armstrong, Harry Armstrong and Gene Armstrong. Shortly after the group's formation, vocalist John Ellison joined, prompting a name change. This line-up released two unsuccessful singles in 1965, "Stop Hurting Me" and "I Don't Want to Cry", before both Harry Armstrong and Gene Armstrong left the group, being replaced by Vonn Elle Benjamin and Lester Peleman.

It was this line-up that released the single "Don't Neglect Your Baby" before Sam Armstrong left the group to be replaced by Joe Johnson. They then signed a deal with Atlantic Records after being introduced to Jerry Wexler by a Philadelphia DJ and subsequently released "Some Kind of Wonderful" which reached No. 91 on the Billboard Hot 100. They followed with several more unsuccessful singles before being dropped by Atlantic.

This prompted Charles Armstrong, Harry Armstrong, Vonn Elle Benjamin and Lester Peleman to leave the group and be replaced by James Swails Jr, Charles Pevy and Eddie Reno. This line-up released four singles as John Ellison and the Soul Brothers Six (despite there only being five band members) during the 1970s, before disbanding.

John Ellison continued on in the music industry and released two solo albums, Welcome Back in 1993 and Missing You, in 2000.

== Discography ==
Year	Single	US Pop
1965	"Stop Hurting Me"	—
1965	"I Don't Want to Cry"	—
1966	"Don't Neglect Your Baby"	—
1967	"You Better Check Yourself"	—
1967	"Some Kind of Wonderful" / "I'll Be Loving You"	91
1967	"What Can You Do When You Ain't Got Nobody"	107
1968	"Your Love Is Such a Wonderful Love"	—
1969	"Drive"	—
1969	"Thank You Baby for Loving Me"	—
1972	"Funky Funky Way of Makin Love" / "Let Me Be the One"	—
1973	"You Gotta Come a Little Closer" / "You're My World"	—
1973	"Lost the Will to Live"	—
1976	"Can You Feel the Vibrations"	—
"—" denotes releases that did not chart or were not released in that territory.
