= Phoenix (Grand Funk Railroad album) =

Studio album by Grand Funk Railroad
- Released: September 15, 1972
- Recorded: 1972
- Studio: Sound Shop, Nashville
- Genre: Hard rock
- Length: 41:12
- Label: Capitol
- Producer: Grand Funk Railroad

Grand Funk Railroad chronology
Mark, Don & Mel: 1969–71 (1972)	Phoenix (1972)	We're an American Band (1973)

Singles from Phoenix
- 1. "Rock & Roll Soul"/"Flight of the Phoenix"

Phoenix is the sixth studio album by American rock band Grand Funk Railroad, released on September 15, 1972, by Capitol Records. The album was produced by the band and marks their first album without producer Terry Knight. "Rock & Roll Soul" was released as a single and peaked at #29 on the US Billboard Hot 100 in 1972.

Professional ratings
Review scores
Source	Rating
AllMusic	2/5 stars
Christgau's Record Guide	C−
The Rolling Stone Album Guide	1.5/5 stars

== Track listing ==
All tracks written by Mark Farner.

=== Side one ===
1. "Flight of the Phoenix" – 3:38
2. "Trying to Get Away" – 4:11
3. "Someone" – 4:04
4. "She Got to Move Me" – 4:48
5. "Rain Keeps Fallin'" – 3:25

=== Side two ===
1. "I Just Gotta Know" – 3:52
2. "So You Won't Have to Die" – 3:21
3. "Freedom Is for Children" – 6:06
4. "Gotta Find Me a Better Day" – 4:07
5. "Rock 'n Roll Soul" – 3:40

=== Bonus track (CD release) ===
1. "Flight of the Phoenix" (Remix with extended ending) – 5:22

== Personnel ==
Grand Funk Railroad

- Mark Farner – guitar, harmonica, vocals; organ on "Flight of the Phoenix"
- Mel Schacher – bass
- Don Brewer – drums, congas, percussion, vocals

Additional personnel

- Craig Frost – organ, clavinet, harpsichord, piano
- Doug Kershaw – electric violin

2002 Remaster

- David K. Tedds – produced & compiled for reissue by
- Kevin Flaherty – supervising A&R producer
- Jimmy Hoyson – bonus track mix engineer
- Evren Göknar – mastering engineer
- Kenny Nemes – project manager
- Michelle Azzopardi – reissue creative direction
- Neil Kellerhouse – reissue art direction, design
- Steve Roeser – liner notes
- Brendan Gormley – editorial supervision
- Bryan Kelley – production
- Shannon Ward – production

== Charts ==
Album

Year	Chart	Peak Position
1972	Billboard 200	7
1972	Australia	13
1972	Canada	12
1972	Norway	20

Singles

Year	Single	Chart	Position
1972	"Rock 'n' Roll Soul"	Billboard Hot 100	29
1972	"Rock 'n' Roll Soul"	Canada	37
