= All the Girls in the World Beware!!! =

Studio album by Grand Funk Railroad
- Released: December 1974
- Recorded: 1974
- Studios: The Swamp, Parshallville
- Genre: Hard rock
- Length: 39:17
- Label: Capitol Records
- Producer: Jimmy Ienner

Grand Funk Railroad chronology
Shinin' On (1974)	All the Girls in the World Beware!!! (1974)	Caught in the Act (1975)

Singles from All the Girls in the World Beware!!!
- 1. "Some Kind of Wonderful"/"Wild" Released: December 9, 1974; 2. "Bad Time"/"Good and Evil" Released: March 24, 1975

Professional ratings
Review scores
Source	Rating
AllMusic	2.5/5 stars

All the Girls in the World Beware!!! is the ninth studio album by American hard rock band Grand Funk Railroad. The album was released by Capitol Records in December 1974 and was the group's second album released that year. The first single from the album, "Some Kind of Wonderful", was released on December 16, 1974, and its follow-up, "Bad Time", was released on March 24, 1975. A Quadraphonic mix of the album was available on the Quadraphonic 8-Track cartridge format.

== Recording, production, and songs ==
All the Girls in the World Beware!!! was recorded at the Swamp, a studio owned by band member Mark Farner and situated on his farm in Parshallville, MI. The recording engineer on the sessions was Shelly Yakus with assistance by Kevin Ayers and Rod O'Brien. The album's producer was Jimmy Ienner. Ienner worked with many pop and rock musicians including Three Dog Night, the Raspberries, and the Bay City Rollers, among others. Ienner would later work on the 1987 film Dirty Dancing, as well as the film's soundtrack.

All but two of the songs on the album were written by members of the band, most of which were either written or co-written by Mark Farner. The album also saw an increase in the number of songs co-written by Craig Frost, who co-wrote three songs on the album—which was more than he had written on the three previous albums that he recorded with the group. During this time, Mark Farner was getting divorced from his first wife, which inspired the lyrics to "Bad Time" and other Farner written songs on the album.

== Artwork and design ==
The album's artwork originated from a concept by Lynn Goldsmith and Andrew Cavaliere, which included taking the faces of the band members and manipulating them onto the bodies of famous body builders Arnold Schwarzenegger and Franco Columbu. The body builder photos were used on the front and back of the vinyl sleeve cover, and were printed on the disc labels. The inside sleeve included an illustrated poster of the band, with the bodies of the body builders, surrounded by a crowd of women. The poster was illustrated by noted comic book artist Neal Adams.

== 1975 world tour ==
During the finalizing of the album, the group was preparing to undergo a world tour at the beginning of 1975. The tour started on January 2 in Mobile, Alabama, and ended on May 28 in Hawaii. The tour also included several stops around Europe in April and concerts in Canada and Japan in May.

== Track listing ==
All songs written and composed by Mark Farner, except where noted.

Side one
No.	Title	Writer(s)	Length
1.	"Responsibility"		3:50
2.	"Runnin'"	Don Brewer, Craig Frost	4:19
3.	"Life"		4:58
4.	"Look at Granny Run Run"	Jerry Ragovoy, Mort Shuman	2:29
5.	"Memories"		3:31

Side two
No.	Title	Writer(s)	Length
6.	"All the Girls in the World Beware"	Farner, Frost	3:29
7.	"Wild"		2:53
8.	"Good & Evil"	Brewer, Frost	7:32
9.	"Bad Time"		2:54
10.	"Some Kind of Wonderful"	John Ellison	3:22

== Personnel ==
The following people contributed to All the Girls in the World Beware!!!:

- Mark Farner – vocals, guitars, percussion
- Craig Frost – organ, keyboards, percussion, background vocals
- Mel Schacher – bass
- Don Brewer – vocals, drums, percussion
- Jimmy Ienner – producer
- Shelly Yakus – recording engineer
- Kevin Ayers – assistant engineer
- Rod O'Brien – assistant engineer
- Tony Camillo – string and horn arrangements

2002 Remaster

- David K. Tedds – produced & compiled for reissue by
- Kevin Flaherty – supervising A&R producer
- Jimmy Hoyson – bonus track mix engineer
- Evren Göknar – mastering engineer
- Kenny Nemes – project manager
- Michelle Azzopardi – reissue creative direction
- Neil Kellerhouse – reissue art direction, design
- Steve Roeser – liner notes
- Brendan Gormley – editorial supervision
- Bryan Kelley – production
- Shannon Ward – production

== Charts ==
Album

Year	Chart	Peak Position
1974	Billboard 200	10
1974	Australia	66
1974	Canada	20

Singles

Year	Single	Chart	Position
1974	"Some Kind of Wonderful"	Billboard Hot 100	3
1974	"Some Kind of Wonderful"	US R&B	85
1974	"Some Kind of Wonderful"	Canada	6
1974	"Some Kind of Wonderful"	Australia	39
1975	"Bad Time"	Billboard Hot 100	4
1975	"Bad Time"	Canada	3
