= What's Funk? =

Studio album by Grand Funk Railroad
- Released: January 1983
- Genre: Hard rock; blues rock
- Length: 39:07
- Label: Full Moon Records
- Producer: Cliff Davies, Gary Lyons

Grand Funk Railroad chronology
Grand Funk Lives (1981)	What's Funk? (1983)	Capitol Collectors Series (1991)

Professional ratings
Review scores
Source	Rating
AllMusic	2.5/5 stars
MusicHound Rock: The Essential Album Guide	1/5 stars
The Rolling Stone Album Guide	1/5 stars

What's Funk? is the thirteenth studio album by Grand Funk Railroad, released in 1983. Though the band have continued to tour throughout the years, this stands as their most recent album to date.

== Track listing ==
All songs written and composed by Mark Farner, except where noted.

Side one

1. "Rock & Roll American Style" – 4:29
2. "Nowhere to Run" (Holland–Dozier–Holland) – 2:39
3. "Innocent" – 3:05
4. "Still Waitin'" (Don Brewer) – 4:05
5. "Borderline" – 2:56

Side two

1. "El Salvador" – 4:11
2. "It's a Man's World" (James Brown/Betty Jean Newsome) – 4:54
3. "I'm So True" – 4:10
4. "Don't Lie to Me" – 4:18
5. "Life in Outer Space" – 4:20

== Personnel ==
- Mark Farner – guitars, lead and backing vocals, keyboards
- Dennis Bellinger – bass, backing vocals
- Don Brewer – drums, backing and lead vocals, percussion
- Gary Lyons – producer (Tracks 1, 4, 6, 8, 9, 10)
- Cliff Davies – producer (Tracks 2, 3, 5, 7)
