= Tim Cashion =

American musician

Timothy Al Cashion is the current keyboardist for the classic-rock band Grand Funk Railroad. He was born in Charlotte, North Carolina.

His father played acoustic guitar and wrote country songs, recorded 78 rpm singles, and played with his friends in a local band. His mother was the pianist at the local church. Tim started playing drums at age five, playing with his older brother Pat. When Tim was nine, he started playing piano. Heavily influenced by the music of the 1960s, Tim began writing his own music. After two years of attending Appalachian State University, Tim was invited to join the University of Miami's School of Music, from which he graduated with a master's degree in Studio Music/Jazz Vocal.

When Cashion graduated, he was offered a job as the percussionist for the Japanese artist Takanaka. After that, he joined Robert Palmer for his US tour. In 1993, he joined friend and fellow University of Miami alumnus Jon Secada on his debut tour. In 1996 he joined Bob Seger and the Silver Bullet Band for their US tour. In 1999 he once again joined Palmer for a US tour.

Cashion currently plays the keyboard in the classic-rock band Grand Funk Railroad and tours with the band. He released his first solo album titled Wake On Up in 2003. He has since released four more solo albums and has received 3 Carolina Beach Music Awards.
