= Walk Like a Man (Grand Funk Railroad song) =

Single by Grand Funk Railroad

from the album We're an American Band
- B-side: "The Railroad"
- Released: October 29, 1973
- Genre: Rock
- Length: 4:03
- Label: Capitol
- Songwriter(s): Don Brewer, Mark Farner
- Producer(s): Todd Rundgren

Grand Funk Railroad singles chronology
"We're an American Band" (1973)	"Walk Like a Man" (1973)	"The Loco-Motion" (1974)

"Walk Like a Man" is a song written by Don Brewer and Mark Farner and performed by Grand Funk Railroad. It reached number 16 in Canada and number 19 on the Billboard Hot 100 in 1974. It was featured on their 1973 album, We're an American Band.

The song and album were produced by Todd Rundgren. Rundgren recorded his own version of the song for his 2011 release, (re)Production, a compilation of re-recordings of songs he had produced for other bands.

Cash Box said that "the rock energy is high and perfectly carries the spirit of the group."

== Personnel ==
- Don Brewer – lead and backing vocals, drums
- Mark Farner – guitar, backing vocals
- Craig Frost – Wurlitzer electric piano, Hammond B-3 organ, backing vocals
- Mel Schacher – bass

with:

- Todd Rundgren – backing vocals
