= On Time =

Studio album by Grand Funk Railroad
- Released: August 25, 1969
- Recorded: April–June 1969
- Studios: Cleveland Recording Company (Cleveland, Ohio)
- Genres: Hard rock, heavy metal
- Length: 50:50
- Label: Capitol
- Producer: Terry Knight

Grand Funk Railroad chronology
On Time (1969)	Grand Funk (1969)

Singles from On Time
- 1. "Time Machine"/"High on a Horse" Released: July 1969; 2. "Heartbreaker"/"Please Don't Worry" Released: January 1970

Professional ratings
Review scores
Source	Rating
AllMusic	3.5/5 stars
Rolling Stone	4/5 stars

On Time is the debut studio album by American rock band Grand Funk Railroad, released on August 25, 1969, by Capitol Records. It was recorded at Cleveland Recording Company, the album was produced by Terry Knight. "Time Machine", the band's debut single release, made it into the top 50 in the singles charts, reaching #48.

After the success of their second album Grand Funk (also known as The Red Album) in 1970, On Time went gold, one of four RIAA gold record awards for the band that year. The other two albums reaching gold status in 1970 for Grand Funk Railroad were Closer to Home and Live Album.

In 2002, On Time was remastered on CD with bonus tracks and also released in a limited edition box set Trunk of Funk that contained the band's first four albums. The "trunk" has slots for twelve CDs to house the future release of the remaining eight albums that were released by Capitol Records. Also included is a pair of "Shinin' On" 3D glasses, guitar pick and a sticker reproducing a concert ticket.

== Track listing ==
All tracks written by Mark Farner.

Side one
No.	Title	Length
1.	"Are You Ready?"	3:25
2.	"Anybody's Answer"	5:15
3.	"Time Machine"	3:40
4.	"High on a Horse"	2:35
5.	"T.N.U.C."	8:40

Side two
No.	Title	Length
6.	"Into the Sun"	6:25
7.	"Heartbreaker"	6:30
8.	"Call Yourself a Man"	3:00
9.	"Can't Be Too Long"	6:30
10.	"Ups and Downs"	4:50

Bonus tracks
No.	Title	Length
11.	"High on a Horse (Original Version)"	4:25
12.	"Heartbreaker (Original Version)"	6:53

== Personnel ==
=== Grand Funk Railroad ===
- Mark Farner – guitar, piano, harmonica, vocals
- Mel Schacher – bass
- Don Brewer – drums, vocals

=== 2002 Remaster ===
- David K. Tedds – produced & compiled for reissue by
- Kevin Flaherty – supervising A&R producer
- Jimmy Hoyson – bonus track mix engineer
- Evren Göknar – mastering engineer
- Kenny Nemes – project manager
- Michelle Azzopardi – reissue creative direction
- Neil Kellerhouse – reissue art direction, design
- Steve Roeser – liner notes
- Brendan Gormley – editorial supervision
- Bryan Kelley – production
- Shannon Ward – production

== Charts ==
Chart (1969)	Peak position
Australian Albums (Kent Music Report)	14
Canada Top Albums/CDs (RPM)	34
Japanese Albums (Oricon)	44
US Billboard 200	27

== Certifications ==
Region	Certification	Certified units/sales
United States (RIAA)	Gold	500,000^{^}
^{^} Shipments figures based on certification alone.
