= Mark, Don & Mel: 1969–71 =

Mark, Don & Mel: 1969-71
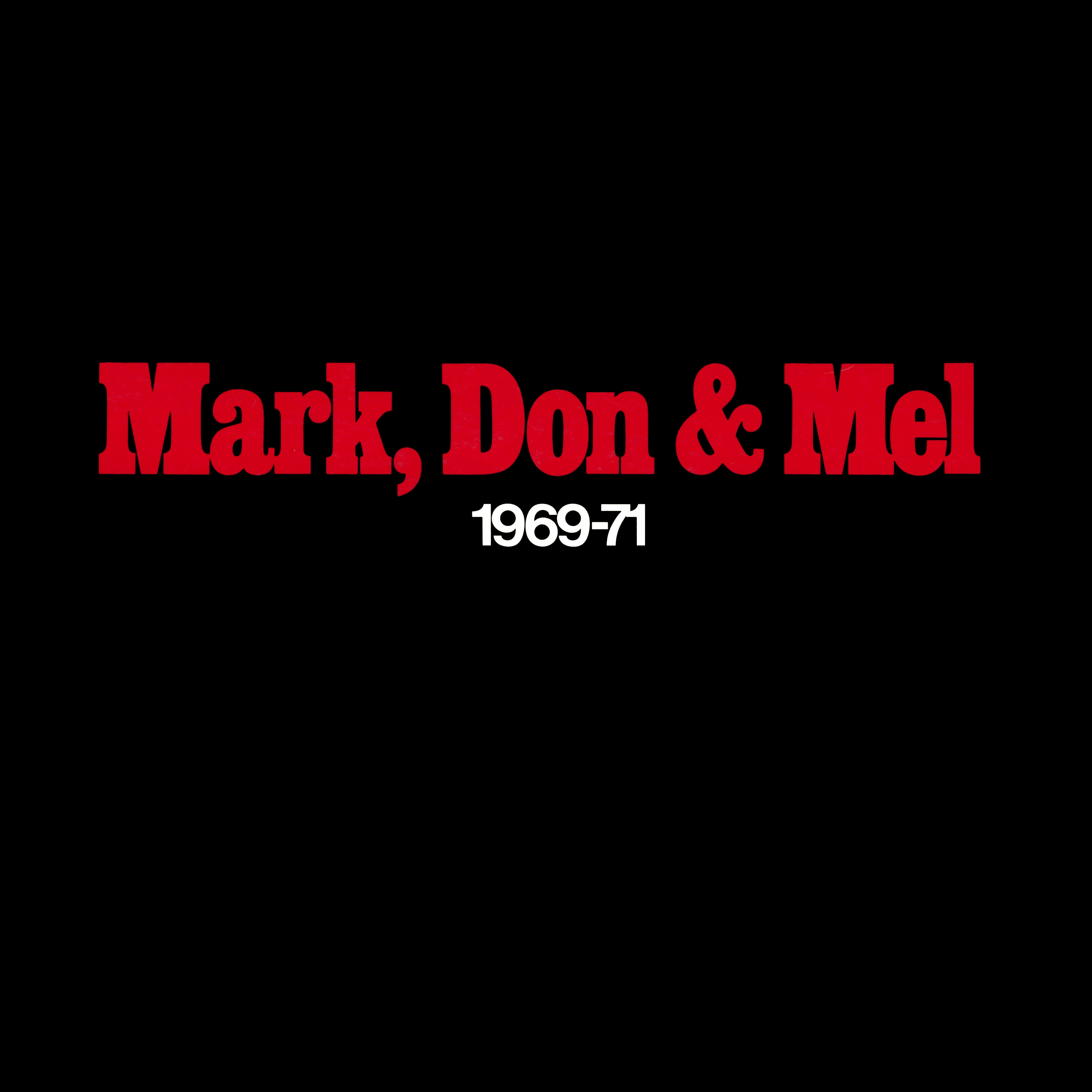

Compilation album by Grand Funk Railroad
- Released: 1972
- Recorded: 1969–1971
- Genres: Acid rock; psychedelic rock; blues rock
- Length: 80:16
- Label: Capitol
- Producer: Terry Knight

Grand Funk Railroad chronology
| E Pluribus Funk (1971) | Mark, Don & Mel: 1969-71 (1972) | Phoenix (1972) |

Professional ratings
Review scores
| Source | Rating |
|---|---|
| AllMusic | 4/5 stars |

Mark, Don & Mel: 1969–71 is a rock album by Grand Funk Railroad that was released in 1972. It is a compilation of early highlights from both studio and live performances while the band was managed by Terry Knight. It peaked at number 17 on the Billboard Top LPs & Tape chart and has been certified gold by the RIAA.

== Track listing ==
Sides run 1, 4, 2, 3 All tracks written by Mark Farner, except where noted.

Side one

1. "Time Machine" - (3:40)
2. "Into the Sun" - (6:25)
3. "Heartbreaker" - (6:30)
4. "Feelin' Alright" (Dave Mason) - (4:25)

Side two

1. "Footstompin' Music" - (3:45)
2. "Paranoid" - (7:35)
3. "Loneliness" - (8:30)

Side three

1. "Are You Ready" (Live) - (3:34)
2. "Mean Mistreater" (Live) - (4:40)
3. "T.N.U.C." (Live) - (11:45)

Side four

1. "Inside Looking Out" (John Lomax, Alan Lomax, Eric Burdon, Chas Chandler) - (9:29)
2. "I'm Your Captain (Closer to Home)" - (9:58)

== See also ==
- Mark, Don & Terry: 1966–67
