= E Pluribus Funk =

Studio album by Grand Funk Railroad
- Released: 15 November 1971
- Recorded: September 1971
- Studios: Cleveland Recording Company, Cleveland
- Genre: Rock
- Length: 35:55
- Label: Capitol
- Producer: Terry Knight

Grand Funk Railroad chronology
Survival (1971)	E Pluribus Funk (1971)	Mark, Don & Mel: 1969–71 (1972)

Singles from E Pluribus Funk
- 1. "People, Let's Stop the War" / "Save the Land" Released: December 1971; 2. "Footstompin' Music" / "I Come Tumblin'" Released: March 1972; 3. "Upsetter" / "No Lies" Released: April 1972

Professional ratings
Review scores
Source	Rating
AllMusic	2/5 stars
Christgau's Record Guide	C
Rolling Stone	3/5 stars

E Pluribus Funk is the fifth studio album by American rock band Grand Funk Railroad. The album was released on November 15, 1971, by Capitol Records. Like previous Grand Funk Railroad albums, it was recorded at Cleveland Recording Company and is the final album produced by Terry Knight. The title is a play on the Latin motto of the United States of America, E pluribus unum ("Out of many, one") and translates as "Out of many, Funk". The original release cover (designed by Ernie Cefalu) was completely round and covered with a silver-like film to resemble a large coin. The back side of the cover of this album included a die cast picture of Shea Stadium to celebrate Grand Funk beating The Beatles' Shea Stadium attendance record by selling out in just 72 hours.

== Critical reception ==
In a contemporary review, Metal Mike Saunders of Rolling Stone wrote that most of E Pluribus Funk "pretty much sputters and wheezes, the whole first side sounding like nothing so much as one long nondescript song that never catches fire." However, he described the second side as "almost a success", thus ensuring that "in some ways E Pluribus Funk may be the best Grand Funk album to date." Nonetheless, by the end of the year he named it what "the MC5 wanted to be but never were" in a piece for Fusion. In The Village Voice, Robert Christgau said the album comprised Grand Funk Railroad's "usual competent loud rock with the usual problems--melodramatic vocalizations and lack of detail."

David Fricke wrote a new review for Rolling Stone for the record's 2002 reissue, as part of the band's remastered catalogue. He wrote "For most folks, a hits disc will suffice. But the best of these reissues show that, for a time, Grand Funk were the people's choice. And the people were right." In The Rolling Stone Album Guide, Nick Catucci favourably wrote that "Farner wails like a cross between Axl Rose and Lynyrd Skynyrd's Ronnie Van Zant, Schacher sprints through fuzz-toned walking basslines, and Brewer guarantees the 'funk' promised in the disc's title." William Ruhlmann of AllMusic said the album's rushed production affected the music and wrote that Grand Funk "were still primarily a live band, able to achieve intensity, but with little sense of the varying dynamics and musical textures that might make a studio album interesting to listen to beyond being a souvenir of their live show."

== Track listing ==
All songs written by Mark Farner.

Side one
No.	Title	Length
1.	"Footstompin' Music"	3:48
2.	"People, Let's Stop the War"	5:12
3.	"Upsetter"	4:27
4.	"I Come Tumblin'"	5:38

Side two
No.	Title	Length
1.	"Save the Land"	4:14
2.	"No Lies"	3:57
3.	"Loneliness"	8:38

== Personnel ==
- Mark Farner – guitar, vocals, organ, harmonica
- Mel Schacher – bass
- Don Brewer – drums, vocals, percussion
- Terry Knight – producer, cover art concept
- Kenneth Hamann – engineer
- Craig Braun – artwork, design
- Tom Baker – arranger and conductor on "Loneliness"

2002 Remaster

- David K. Tedds – produced & compiled for reissue by
- Kevin Flaherty – supervising A&R producer
- Jimmy Hoyson – bonus track mix engineer
- Evren Göknar – mastering engineer
- Kenny Nemes – project manager
- Michelle Azzopardi – reissue creative direction
- Neil Kellerhouse – reissue art direction, design
- Steve Roeser – liner notes
- Brendan Gormley – editorial supervision
- Bryan Kelley – production
- Shannon Ward – production

== Charts ==
Chart (1971-72)	Peak position
Australian Albums (Kent Music Report)	11
Canada Top Albums/CDs (RPM)	3
Japanese Albums (Oricon)	15
US Billboard 200	5

== Certifications ==
Region	Certification	Certified units/sales
United States (RIAA)	Platinum	1,000,000^{^}
^{^} Shipments figures based on certification alone.
