= We're an American Band (song) =

1973 single by Grand Funk Railroad

Single by Grand Funk

from the album We're an American Band
- B-side: "Creepin'"
- Released: July 2, 1973
- Recorded: June 1973
- Studio: Criteria (Miami)
- Genre: Hard rock
- Length: 3:26; 3:31 (2002 remix)
- Label: Capitol
- Songwriter: Don Brewer
- Producer: Todd Rundgren

Grand Funk singles chronology
"Rock & Roll Soul" (1972)	"We're an American Band" (1973)	"Walk Like a Man" (1973)

Gold vinyl issue
- Limited edition release

Music video
- "We’re an American Band" on YouTube

"We're an American Band" is a song by American rock band Grand Funk Railroad. Released on July 2, 1973, from the band's album of the same name, it became the band's first single to top the Billboard charts. Written by Don Brewer and produced by Todd Rundgren, its huge chart success broadened Grand Funk's appeal. In a 2023 interview, Brewer said the song, which stitches together snippets of events from the band's touring life, was written in an effort to garner the band more hits as FM radio stations were transitioning into singles-oriented formats.

According to Brewer, the song was not a rebuke to British band Humble Pie, who Grand Funk had previously toured with.

It is the 99th song on VH1's list of the 100 Greatest Hard Rock Songs.

== Reception ==
Cash Box said that the "group comes through with powerful, chunky rhythms and meaningful lyrics."

== Personnel ==
- Don Brewer – lead vocals, cowbell, drums
- Mark Farner – guitar, backing vocals
- Mel Schacher – bass
- Craig Frost – clavinet, Moog synthesizer, Hammond organ, backing vocals

== Charts ==
=== Weekly charts ===
Chart (1973)	Peak position
Australia (Kent Music Report)	87
Canada RPM Top Singles	4
U.S. Billboard Hot 100	1

=== Year-end charts ===
Chart (1973)	Rank
Canada	21
U.S. Billboard Hot 100	23

== Certifications ==
Region	Certification	Certified units/sales
United States (RIAA)	Platinum	1,000,000^{‡}
^{‡} Sales+streaming figures based on certification alone.

== Poison version ==
"We're An American Band"

Single by Poison

from the album The Best of Poison: 20 Years of Rock
- Released: April 4, 2006
- Recorded: January 2006
- Genre: Rock
- Label: Capitol
- Songwriter: Don Brewer
- Producer: Don Was

Poison singles chronology
"Shooting Star" (2003)	"We're An American Band" (2006)	"What I Like About You" (2007)

"We're An American Band"

Single by Poison

from the album The Best of Poison: 20 Years of Rock
- Released: 2006
- Recorded: 2006
- Genre: Rock
- Label: Capitol
- Songwriter: Don Brewer

Poison singles chronology
"Shooting Star" (2003)	"We're An American Band" (2006)	"What I Like About You" (2007)

Poison (who also recorded for Capitol) covered it and released it as a single with a music video for their The Best of Poison: 20 Years of Rock (2006) compilation which peaked at No. 17 on the Billboard 200.

== Other versions ==
The song has also been covered by Rob Zombie, Garth Brooks, Phish, Kid Rock, Village People, Rascal Flatts, among others.
