= Bad Time (Grand Funk song) =

1975 song by Grand Funk

Single by Grand Funk

from the album All the Girls in the World Beware!!!
- B-side: "Good & Evil"
- Released: March 24, 1975
- Recorded: 1974
- Genre: Rock
- Length: 2:55
- Label: Capitol Records 4046
- Songwriter(s): Mark Farner
- Producer(s): Jimmy Ienner

Grand Funk singles chronology
"Some Kind of Wonderful" (1974)	"Bad Time" (1975)	"Take Me" (1976)

"Bad Time" is a song written by Mark Farner and performed by Grand Funk. The song is featured on the band's 1974 album, All the Girls in the World Beware!!!. It peaked at number 4 on the Billboard Hot 100 the weeks of June 7 and 14, 1975.

Jimmy Ienner produced the song, and it was arranged by Tony Camillo. It was the group's fourth and final single to reach the Top 10, and their final Top 40 hit in the U.S.

"Bad Time" marked the end of the group's two-year run as Grand Funk, during which time they scored all their major hits. Following this release, their name reverted to Grand Funk Railroad.

== Chart performance ==
=== Weekly charts ===
Chart (1975)	Peak position
Canada RPM Top Singles	3
New Zealand (RIANZ)	19
U.S. Billboard Hot 100	4
U.S. Cashbox Top 100	5

=== Year-end charts ===
Chart (1975)	Rank
U.S. Billboard Hot 100	62
U.S. Cash Box Hot 100	76
Canada	46

== Other versions ==
- The Jayhawks released the track on their 1995 album, Tomorrow the Green Grass. This version went to number 40 on the UK Singles Chart.
