= Grand Funk Railroad =

American band

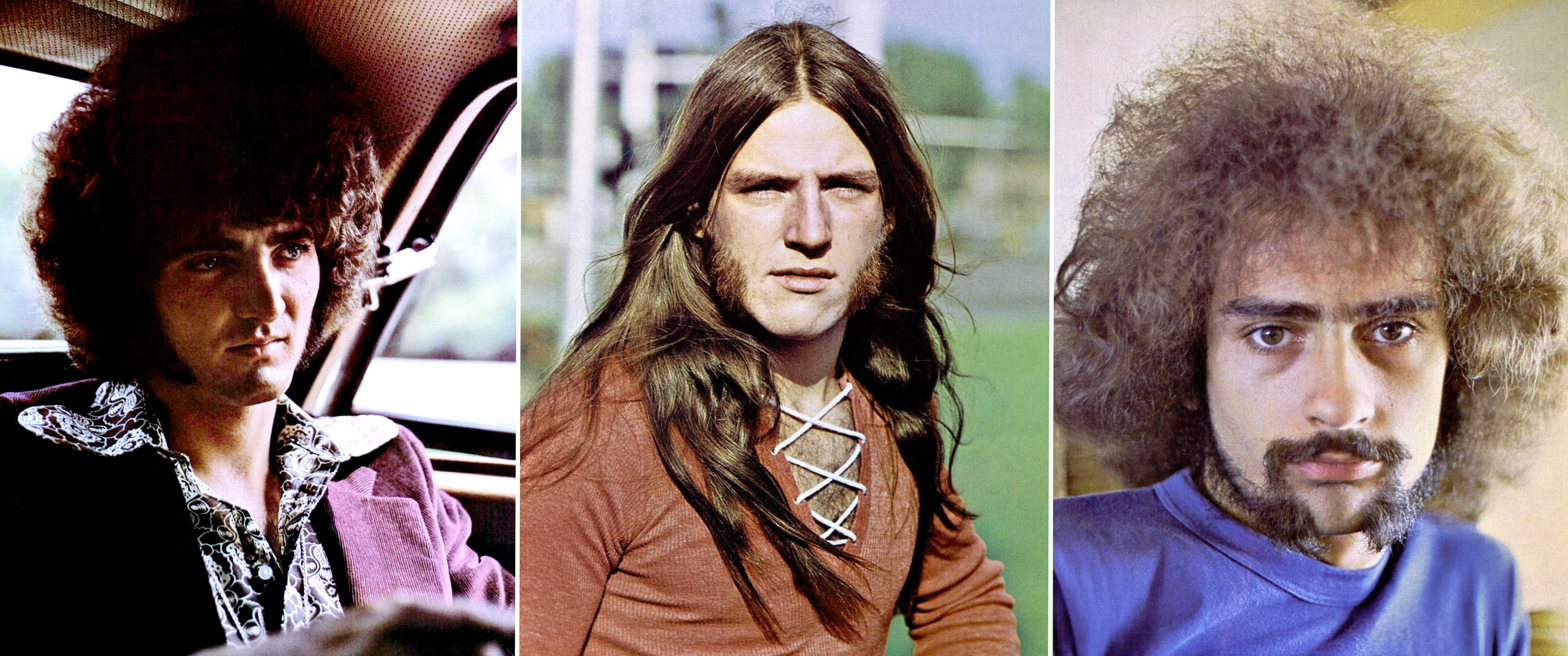
- The original trio in 1971. Left to right: Don Brewer, Mark Farner and Mel Schacher.

Background information
- Also known as: Grand Funk, GFR
- Origin: Flint, Michigan, U.S.
- Genres: Rock; hard rock; arena rock
- Works: Discography
- Years active: 1969–1976; 1981–1983; 1996–1998; 2000–present
- Labels: Capitol; MCA; Full Moon
- Members: Don Brewer; Mel Schacher; Tim Cashion; Mark Chatfield
- Past members: Mark Farner; Craig Frost; Dennis Bellinger; Rick Baker; Howard Eddy, Jr. Stanley Sheldon; Bruce Kulick; Max Carl
- Website: grandfunkrailroad.com

Grand Funk Railroad (often shortened to Grand Funk) is an American rock band formed in Flint, Michigan, in 1969 by Mark Farner (vocals, guitar, keyboards, harmonica), Don Brewer (drums, vocals) and Mel Schacher (bass). Keyboard player Craig Frost joined them in 1972. The band achieved peak popularity and success during the 1970s with hit songs such as "We're an American Band", "I'm Your Captain (Closer to Home)", "Some Kind of Wonderful" (a cover of Soul Brothers Six), "Walk Like a Man", "The Loco-Motion" (a cover of Little Eva), "Bad Time" and "Shinin' On". Grand Funk released six Platinum and seven Gold-certified albums between their recording debut in 1969 and their first disbandment in 1976.

Known for a crowd-pleasing arena rock style, the band toured extensively and played to packed arenas worldwide, and was well-regarded by audiences despite a relative lack of critical praise. The original trio reunited at various times later into the band's career; after Farner's ouster in 1998, Brewer and Schacher have continued touring as Grand Funk Railroad.

== History ==
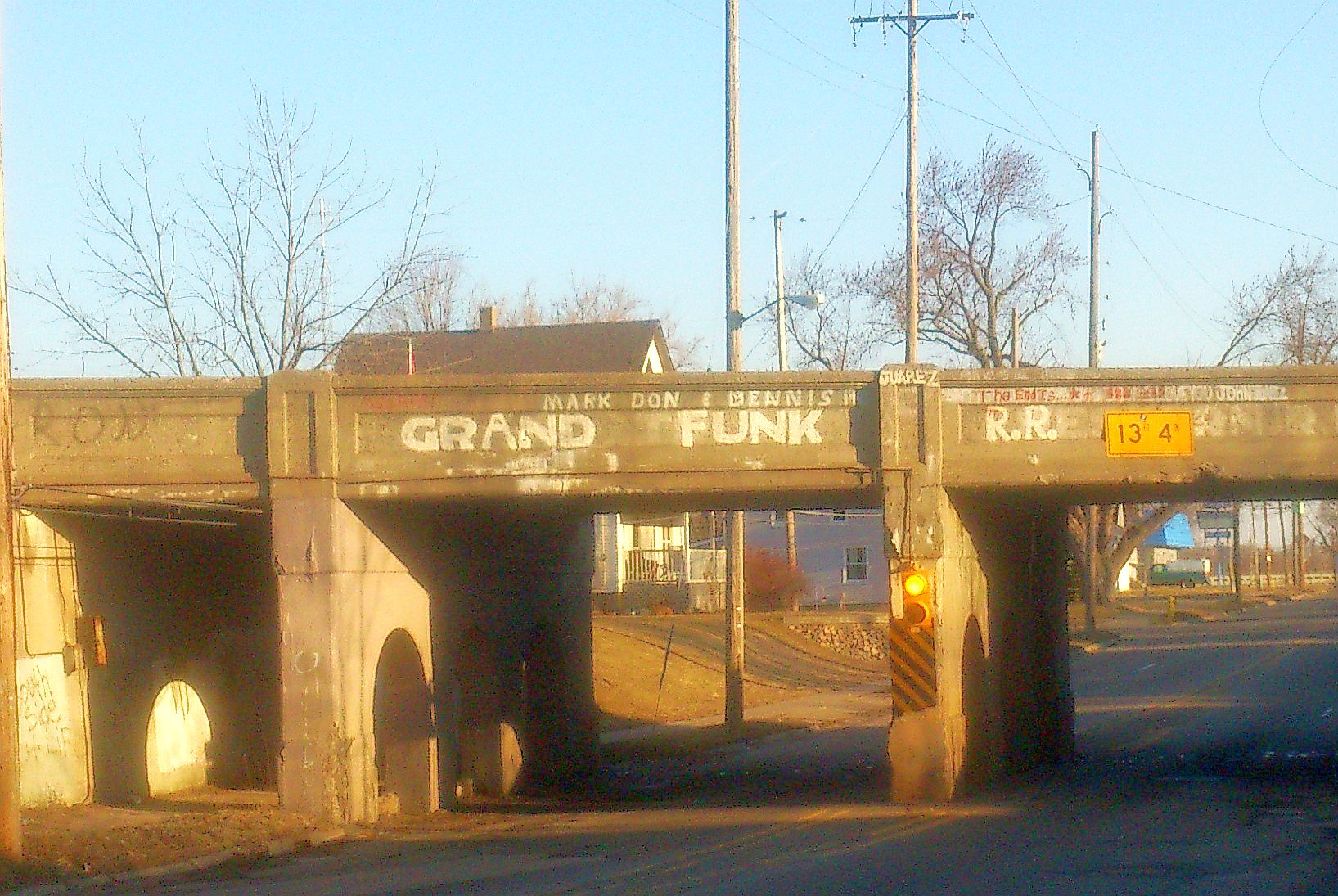
A Grand Trunk Western Railroad bridge (over Fenton Road) in Grand Funk's hometown of Flint, Michigan, that was re-painted to instead show the band's name, as well as the first names of founding members Mark Farner and Don Brewer, and early 1980s bassist Dennis Bellinger

=== Formation (1969) ===
Grand Funk Railroad was formed as a trio in 1969 by Mark Farner and Don Brewer from Terry Knight and the Pack and Mel Schacher from Question Mark & the Mysterians. Terry Knight, after being approached by Brewer, soon became the band's manager and also named the band originally "Grand Trunk Railroad" as a play on words for the Grand Trunk Western Railroad, a well-known rail line in Michigan. The railroad objected to using their name, and the band was forced to change the name to Grand Funk Railroad.

The band first achieved recognition at the 1969 Atlanta International Pop Festival after their local promoter, Jeep Holland, got them the slot for no monetary compensation, and after opening the first day, the band went down so well that they were invited to appear on all three days. This exposure proved to be invaluable, and the band was signed by Capitol Records, where their manager, Terry Knight, was working as an A&R person. After a raucous, well-received set on the first day of the festival, Grand Funk was asked back to play at the 1970 Atlanta International Pop Festival II the following year.

In August 1969 the band released its first album, titled On Time, which sold over 1,000,000 copies and was awarded a Gold record in 1970. The album topped the American album charts.

In February 1970 a second album, Grand Funk (or The Red Album), was awarded Gold status less than two months after its release. Despite critical pans and little airplay, the group's first eight albums (seven studio releases and one live album) were quite successful.

=== Early 1970s ===
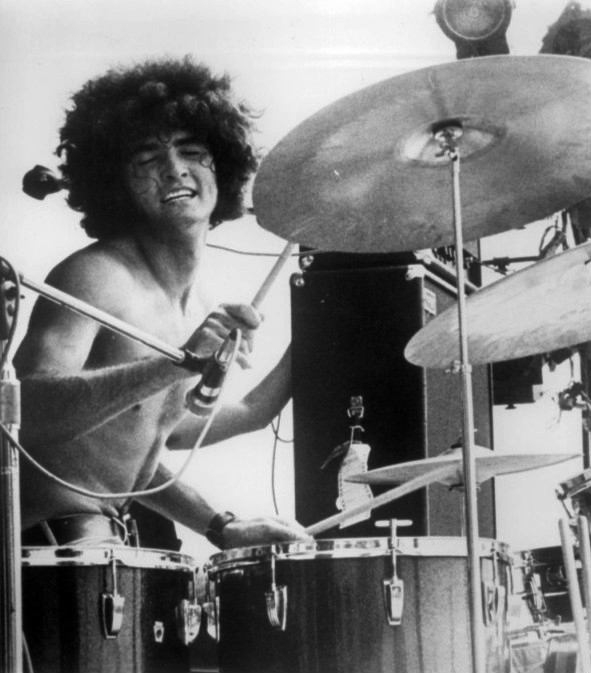
Brewer of Grand Funk Railroad in 1970

The hit single "I'm Your Captain (Closer to Home)", from the album Closer to Home, released in June 1970, was considered stylistically representative of Terry Knight and the Pack's recordings. In the spring of 1970, Knight launched an intensive advertising campaign to promote the album Closer to Home. That album was certified multi-Platinum despite a lack of critical approval. The band spent $100,000 on a New York City Times Square billboard to advertise Closer to Home.

By 1971, Grand Funk equaled the Beatles' Shea Stadium attendance record but sold out the venue in just 72 hours, whereas the Beatles concert took a few weeks to sell out. Following Closer to Home, the double disc Live Album was also released later in 1970 and was another Gold disc recipient. Survival and E Pluribus Funk were both released in 1971. E Pluribus Funk celebrated the Shea Stadium show with an embossed depiction of the stadium on the album cover's reverse.

By late 1971, the band was concerned with Knight's managerial style and fiscal responsibility. This growing dissatisfaction led Grand Funk Railroad to fire Knight in March 1972. Knight sued for breach of contract, which resulted in a protracted legal battle. Knight even showed up to repossess the band's gear before a benefit gig for the drug rehab Phoenix House at Madison Square Garden on December 23, 1972. But the band's new lawyer, John Eastman (Paul McCartney's brother-in-law), was able to convince Knight to wait until after the show, to avoid a potential riot of fans. The show went ahead and was taped for the ABC show In Concert. In VH1's Behind the Music Grand Funk Railroad episode, Knight stated that the original contract would have run out in about three months and that the wise decision for the band would have been to wait out the time. However, at that moment, the band members felt they had no choice but to continue and fight for the rights to their careers and name. The legal battle with Knight lasted two years and ended when the band settled out of court. Knight became the clear winner with the copyrights and publisher's royalties to every Grand Funk recording made from March 1969 through March 1972, not to mention an enormous payoff in cash and oil wells. Farner, Brewer, and Schacher were given the rights to the name Grand Funk Railroad.

In 1972 Grand Funk Railroad added former Fabulous Pack bandmate Craig Frost on keyboards full-time. The addition of Frost, was a stylistic shift from Grand Funk's original garage-band-based rock and roll roots to a more rhythm & blues/pop rock-oriented style. With the new lineup, Grand Funk released Phoenix, its sixth album of original music, in September 1972.

The band hired road manager Andy Cavaliere. His girlfriend Lynn Goldsmith was able to secure veteran musician Todd Rundgren as a producer. With the band's name shortened to Grand Funk, its two most successful albums and two number-one hit singles resulted: the Brewer-penned "We're an American Band" (from the album We're an American Band, released in July 1973) and "The Loco-Motion" (from their 1974 album Shinin' On, written by Carole King and Gerry Goffin and originally recorded by Little Eva). "We're an American Band" became Grand Funk's first number 1 hit on Farner's 25th birthday, followed by Brewer's number 19 hit "Walk Like a Man". "The Loco-Motion" in 1974 was Grand Funk's second chart-topping single, followed by Brewer's number 11 hit "Shinin' On". The band continued touring the U.S., Europe, and Japan.

=== Mid-1970s ===
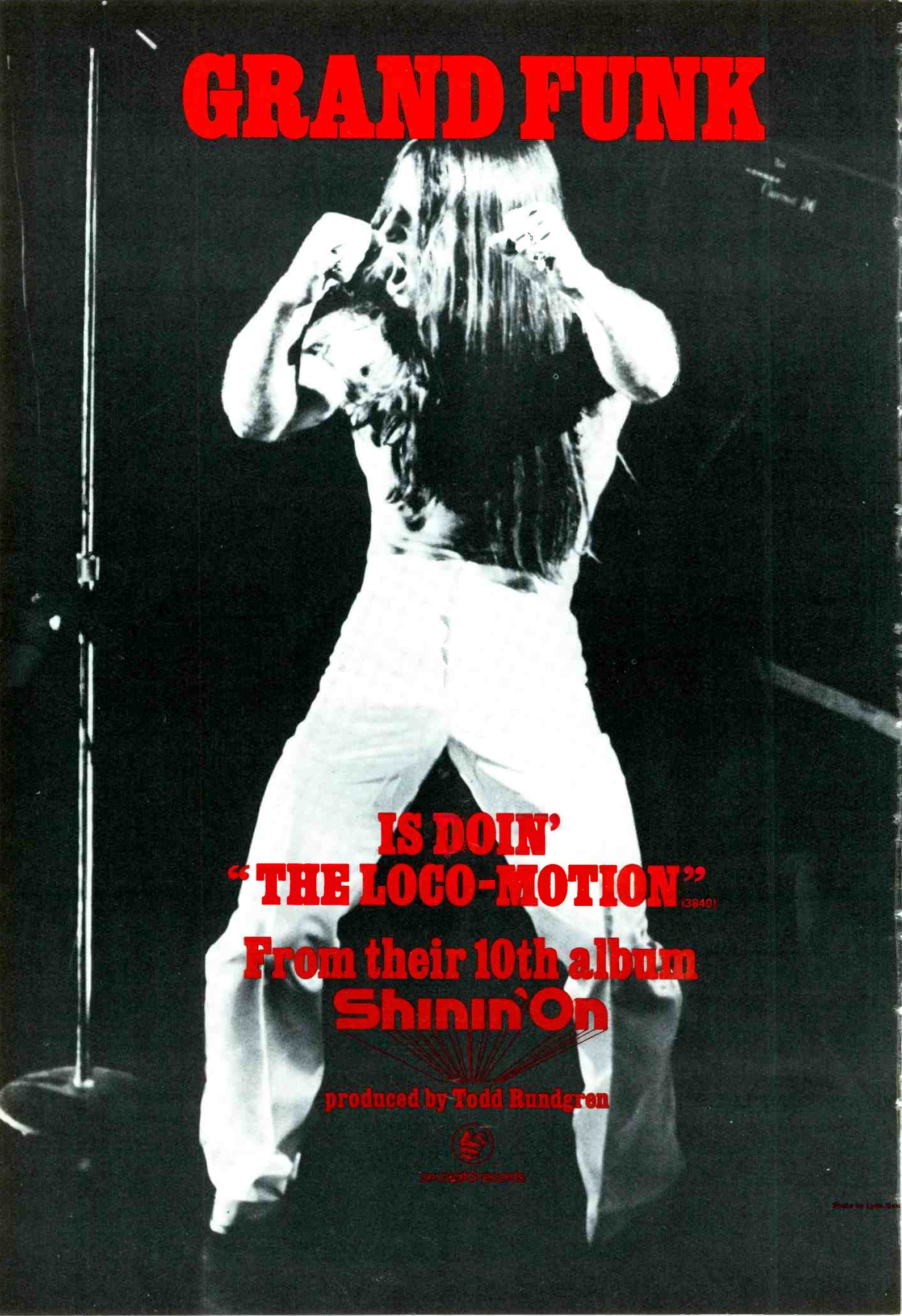
Cashbox advertisement, March 2, 1974

In 1974 Grand Funk engaged Jimmy Ienner as producer and reverted to using their full name: Grand Funk Railroad. The cover of All the Girls in the World Beware!!! (December 1974) depicted the band members' heads superimposed on the bodies of bodybuilders Arnold Schwarzenegger and Franco Columbu. This album spawned the band's last two Top 10 hits, "Some Kind of Wonderful" and "Bad Time" in late 1974/early 1975.

Although they were highly successful in the mid-1970s, tensions mounted within the band due to personal issues, burn-out, and disputes over musical direction. Despite these issues, Grand Funk forged ahead. Needing two more albums to complete their record deal with Capitol, Grand Funk embarked on a major tour and decided to record a double live album, Caught in the Act (August 1975).

The double album should have fulfilled the contract with Capitol; however, because it contained previously released material, Capitol requested an additional album to complete Grand Funk's contractual obligation. While pressures between the band members still existed, they agreed to move forward and complete one more album for Capitol to avoid legalities similar to those they endured with Terry Knight in 1972. The band recorded Born to Die (January 1976), but its lower sales (it only reached No. 47 on the Billboard chart) and lack of hit singles disappointed the group. They began to drift apart, and rumors of a breakup were circulating.

However, Grand Funk found new life from interest by Frank Zappa in producing the band. Signing with MCA Records, the resulting album Good Singin', Good Playin' (August 1976), although it netted them some of their best critical reviews ever, yielded little success. After this, a disillusioned Grand Funk Railroad disbanded in earnest in late 1976. Farner recalled what happened then: "Things were disenfranchised within the band. I don't want to speculate about what was going on in Brewer's life—his first wife died, and that was rough—but one day he walked into the studio and said, 'I've had it. I need to find something to do with my life that's more stable.' He was done. He walked out and slammed the door. It was him, not me. Everybody thinks I broke the band up, but it was him."

=== First disbanding, 1976–1981; new lineup in the early 1980s ===
Following the breakup, Farner began a solo career and signed with Atlantic Records, which resulted in two albums: Mark Farner (1977) and No Frills (1978). Brewer, Schacher and Frost remained together and formed the band Flint. Flint released one 1978 album on Columbia Records; a second record was finished but never released.

In 1981 Grand Funk Railroad reunited after being approached by their former manager Andy Cavaliere. The reunion took place without Frost (who was playing with Bob Seger) and with Dennis Bellinger replacing Schacher on bass. Schacher begged off saying he had developed a fear of flying but later admitted that he had no longer wanted to be involved with Cavaliere.

The new lineup released two albums on Irving Azoff's Full Moon label, distributed by Warner Bros. Records. These releases included Grand Funk Lives (July 1981) and What's Funk? (January 1983). Neither album achieved much in the way of critical acclaim or sales; but the single "Queen Bee" was included in the film Heavy Metal and its soundtrack album.

The band toured in 1981 and 1982 with Rick Baker joining them on the road to play keyboards. But the dismal sales of Grand Funk Lives and the death of manager Cavaliere in 1982 caused the group to disband a second time in early 1983, shortly after What's Funk? was released.

=== Second disbanding, 1983–1996 ===
Farner continued as a solo performer and became a Christian recording artist while Brewer went on to join Frost in Bob Seger's Silver Bullet Band. Farner was promoted by David Fishof in the late 1980s and was a part of Fishof's concept Ringo Starr & His All-Starr Band in 1995. After that, Fishof began sounding out Farner, Brewer and Schacher about reuniting again.

=== Re-formation, 1996–present ===
After some rehearsals in late 1995, Grand Funk Railroad's three original members (joined on tour by keyboardist/guitarist and background vocalist Howard Eddy Jr.) once again reunited in 1996 and played to 500,000 people during a three-year period. Farner agreed to the reunion but stipulated he be allowed to resume his solo career afterward. He left the door open for another reunion tour

In 1997 the band played three sold-out Bosnian benefit concerts. These shows featured a full symphony orchestra that was conducted by Paul Shaffer (from Late Show with David Letterman). The band released a live two-disc benefit CD called Bosnia recorded in Auburn Hills, Michigan.

Farner stated in an interview that "In 1998 Brewer suggested we form a corporation to limit our liability as individuals on the road and I agreed. Unfortunately this meant that two thirds of the corporation is the majority". In late 2000, Brewer and Schacher voted to go forward without Farner, reneging on the band members' original three-year agreement, recruiting lead vocalist Max Carl (formerly of Jack Mack & the Heart Attack and 38 Special), former Kiss lead guitarist Bruce Kulick and keyboardist Tim Cashion (Bob Seger, Robert Palmer) to complete the new lineup.

In 2005 Grand Funk Railroad was voted into the Michigan Rock and Roll Legends Hall of Fame.

In 2018 Brewer and Schacher sued Farner for filing a trademark for the name "Mark Farner's American Band". The lawsuit stated that Farner had violated a 2004 agreement, which called for, among other things: that Farner's first and last names appear in capital letters before a reference to Grand Funk or Grand Funk Railroad, with only the first letters of the band capitalized, and first letters of the words, "former," "formerly" and "member" also capitalized.

Stanley Sheldon (ex-Peter Frampton) filled in for Schacher after Schacher's wife, Dena, died of cancer.

In 2019 Grand Funk's main hit writer, Mark Farner, was handed a legal victory to tour as "Mark Farner's American Band", after his ex-bandmates sued him to prevent him from using that name. Farner revealed that since the 2004 lawsuit, he was constantly sued by Brewer and Schacher over the mentions of Grand Funk Railroad by his promoters, and that many of his shows since 2004 were canceled because of the injunctions against him by Brewer and Schacher.

Grand Funk Railroad continued to tour, and kicked off its "The American Band Tour 2019", "Celebrating 50 Years of Funk" tour on January 17, 2019.

In January 2, 2024 Kulick announced he was departing Grand Funk Railroad after 23 years, having played his final concert with the group on December 14, 2023, in Marietta, Ohio, citing that he wanted to focus on other projects. Mark Chatfield (formerly with Bob Seger) succeeded Kulick.

In April 2026 Max Carl announced his departure from Grand Funk Railroad for medical reasons after 26 years, with the band continuing its touring with founding member drummer Don Brewer and keyboardist Tim Cashion handling the vocal duties.

== Legacy ==
David Fricke of Rolling Stone magazine once said, "You cannot talk about rock in the 1970s without talking about Grand Funk Railroad!"

== Band members ==
Current

- Don Brewer – drums, lead and backing vocals (1969–1976, 1981–1983, 1996–1998, 2000–present)
- Mel Schacher – bass guitar (1969–1976, 1996-1998, 2000–present)
- Tim Cashion – keyboards, backing and lead vocals (2000–present)
- Mark Chatfield – lead guitar, backing vocals (2024–present)

Former

- Mark Farner – lead and backing vocals, lead and rhythm guitar, keyboards, harmonica (1969–1976, 1981–1983, 1996–1998)
- Craig Frost – keyboards, backing vocals (1973–1976; guest 2005–2012)
- Lorraine Feather – backing vocals (1974–1975)
- Jana Giglio – backing vocals (1974–1975)
- Lance Duncan Ong – keyboards, synthesizer (1981)
- Dennis Bellinger – bass guitar, backing vocals (1981–1983)
- Rick Baker – keyboards, synthesizer (1981–1983)
- Howard Eddy, Jr. – keyboards, rhythm guitar, backing vocals (1996–1998)
- Bruce Kulick – lead guitar, backing vocals (2000–2023, 2025)
- Max Carl – lead and backing vocals, rhythm guitar (2000–2026)
- Stanley Sheldon – bass guitar (2018; substitute for Mel Schacher)

== Discography ==
- On Time (1969)
- Grand Funk (1969)
- Closer to Home (1970)
- Live Album (1970)
- Survival (1971)
- E Pluribus Funk (1971)
- Mark, Don & Mel 1969-71 (1972)
- Phoenix (1972)
- We're an American Band (1973)
- Shinin' On (1974)
- All the Girls in the World Beware!!! (1974)
- Born to Die (1976)
- Good Singin', Good Playin' (1976)
- Grand Funk Lives (1981)
- What's Funk? (1983)
