= Craig Frost =

American keyboardist

- Born: April 20, 1948 (age 78); Flint, Michigan, U.S.
- Occupations: Musician; songwriter
- Instrument: Keyboards
- Years active: 1960–present
- Formerly of: Bob Seger & the Silver Bullet Band, Grand Funk Railroad

Craig Frost (born April 20, 1948) is an American musician who rose to prominence as a member of the rock band Grand Funk Railroad, which he joined in 1973 after working with them the previous year. He plays organ, synthesizers and piano.

Frost expanded Grand Funk's "power trio" musical style by adding another aspect to their music. Grand Funk experienced their most success with Frost after he joined the band in 1973, and his recognizable work on their popular hit songs "The Loco-Motion" (Little Eva cover) and "We're an American Band". He also contributed significantly to Grand Funk as a songwriter, in partnership with drummer Don Brewer.

After the initial breakup of Grand Funk Railroad in 1977, Frost joined with former bandmates Don Brewer and bassist Mel Schacher to form the short-lived band Flint. After its disbanding, he joined Bob Seger & the Silver Bullet Band, where he remained for over two decades. In July 2005, Frost "sat in" at a concert in North Branch, Michigan for the first time since 1977 with Grand Funk. He has done so a number of times since, at such locations as Detroit and Las Vegas.
