= Some Kind of Wonderful (Soul Brothers Six song) =

1967 single by Soul Brothers Six

Single by Soul Brothers Six
- B-side: "I'll Be Loving You"
- Released: May 1967
- Recorded: March 30, 1967
- Studio: Atlantic Studios, New York City
- Genre: Soul; funk; gospel
- Length: 2:38
- Label: Atlantic 2406
- Songwriter: John Ellison

Soul Brothers Six singles chronology
"Don't Neglect Your Baby" (1966)	"Some Kind of Wonderful" (1967)	"You Better Check Yourself" (1967)

"(She's) Some Kind of Wonderful" is a song written by Canadian-American musician John Ellison and first recorded by his R&B group, Soul Brothers Six, in 1967, peaking at number 91 on the US Billboard Hot 100.

The line "She's some kind of wonderful" previously appeared in the song "Too Busy Thinking About My Baby" which was first recorded by The Temptations (released in 1966).

The best known version is by American rock band Grand Funk Railroad from 1974, which reached number three on the same chart.

== The Fantastic Johnny C version ==
The Fantastic Johnny C covered the song in 1968, reaching number 87 on the US Billboard Hot 100.

== Grand Funk Railroad version ==
"Some Kind of Wonderful"

Single by Grand Funk Railroad

from the album All the Girls in the World Beware!!!
- B-side: "Wild"
- Released: December 9, 1974
- Recorded: 1974 at the Swamp
- Genre: Rock
- Length: 3:22
- Label: Capitol 4002
- Songwriter: John Ellison
- Producer: Jimmy Ienner

Grand Funk Railroad singles chronology
"Shinin' On" / "Mr. Pretty Boy" (1974)	"Some Kind of Wonderful" (1974)	"Bad Time" (1975)

In 1974, American rock band Grand Funk Railroad recorded the song for their album All the Girls in the World Beware!!!; it reached number three on the US Billboard Hot 100 on February 22, 1975. It also ranked number six on Billboard's Hot 100 year-end chart for 1975 as shown on the December 27, 1975, print edition of Billboard, which contained the Hot 100 for 1975. This is the official list still shown on Billboard magazine website.

Their version of the song appeared in the 2004 video game Grand Theft Auto: San Andreas on the fictitious radio station K-DST.

== Charts ==
Year	Artist	Chart	Peak position
1967	Soul Brothers Six	US Billboard Hot 100	91
1968	The Fantastic Johnny C	US Billboard Hot 100	87
1975	Grand Funk Railroad	Canada Top Singles (RPM)	6
1975	Grand Funk Railroad	US Billboard Hot 100	3
1994	Huey Lewis and the News	Canada Adult Contemporary (RPM)	37
1994	Huey Lewis and the News	Europe (European Hit Radio)	9
1994	Huey Lewis and the News	Iceland (Íslenski Listinn Topp 40)	10
1994	Huey Lewis and the News	UK Singles (OCC)	84
1994	Huey Lewis and the News	US Billboard Hot 100	44
1994	Huey Lewis and the News	US Adult Contemporary (Billboard)	7
1994	Huey Lewis and the News	US Cash Box Top 100	48
2002	Toploader	UK Singles (OCC)	76

== Certifications ==
=== Grand Funk Railroad version ===
Region	Certification	Certified units/sales
United States (RIAA)	Platinum	1,000,000^{‡}
^{‡} Sales+streaming figures based on certification alone.
