= Mel Schacher =

American bassist (born 1951)

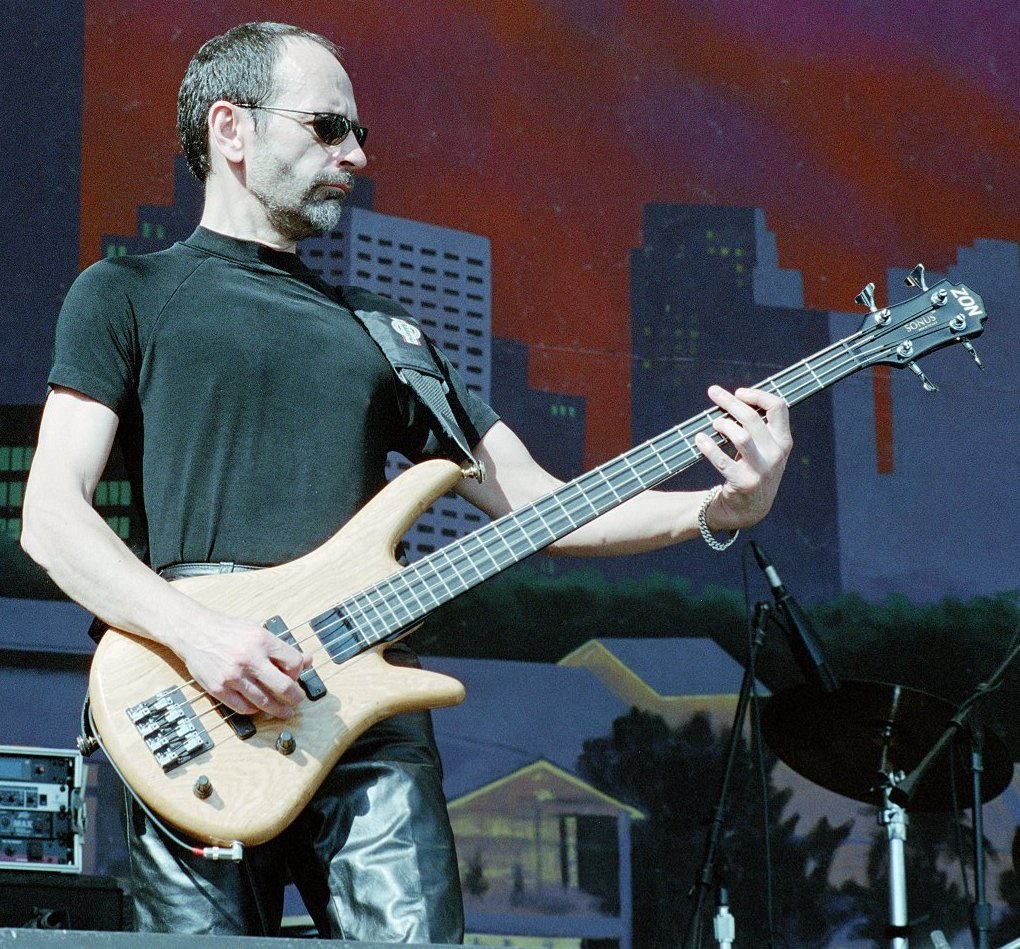
- Schacher performing in 2002

Background information
- Born: Melvin George Schacher; April 8, 1951 (age 75); Owosso, Michigan, U.S.
- Origin: Flint, Michigan, U.S.
- Genres: Rock, hard rock
- Occupation: Bassist
- Years active: 1960s–present
- Member of: Grand Funk Railroad
- Formerly of: ? and the Mysterians

Melvin George Schacher (born April 8, 1951) is an American musician who is the bassist and a founding member of the hard rock band Grand Funk Railroad.

== Early life ==
Schacher was born in Owosso, Michigan, and was raised in Flint, Michigan. He became interested in music at the age of seven playing with his father's banjo. By age twelve he had moved to playing guitar and then bass. By age fourteen, Schacher was part of a trio playing mostly wedding receptions and talent competitions while playing with other local bands.

== Career ==
=== The Mysterians ===
At sixteen, Schacher caught his first professional break when he was invited to replace bassist Frank Lugo in Question Mark and the Mysterians, and he supported their hit "96 Tears" (1966) on their 1967 tour.

=== Grand Funk Railroad ===
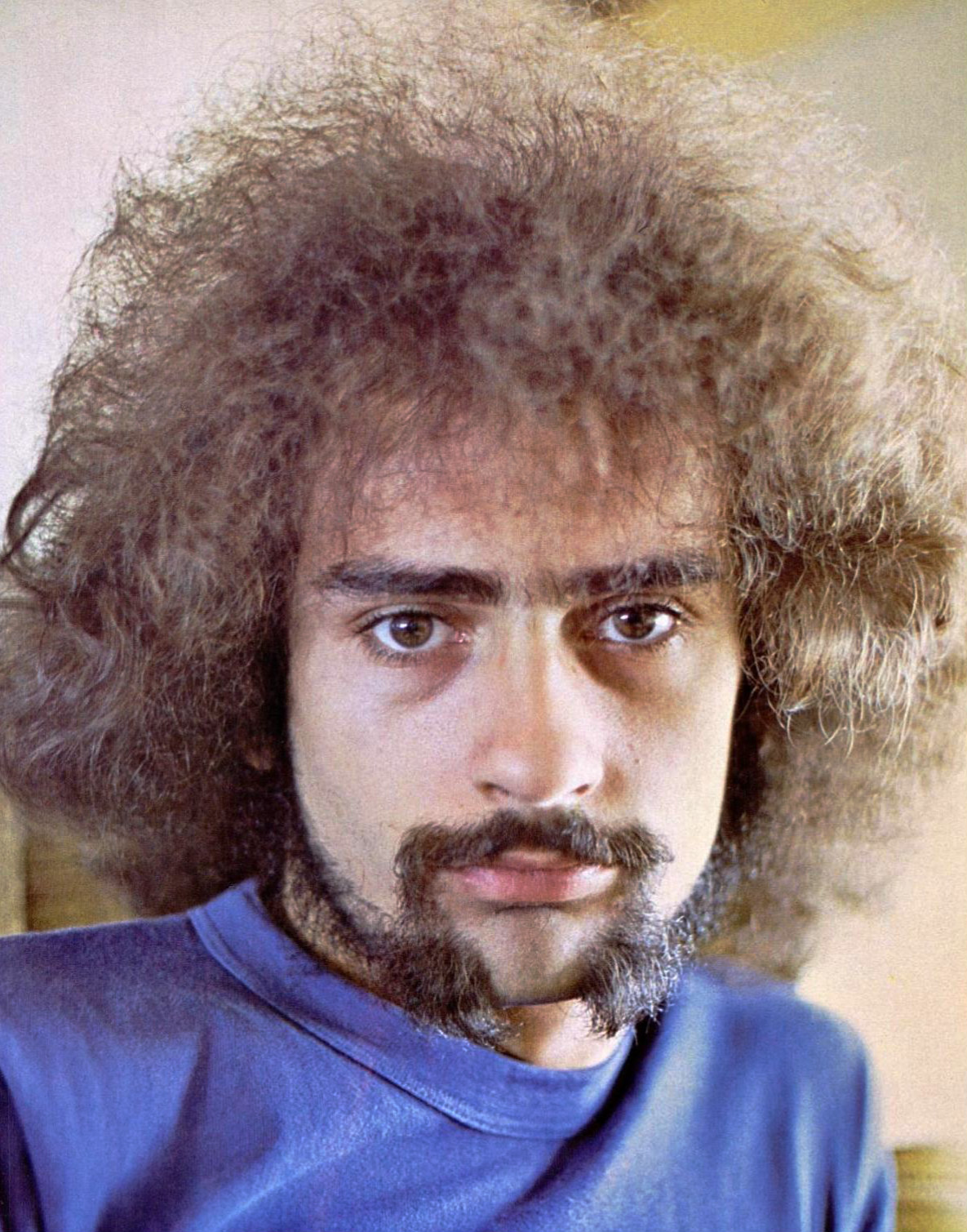
Schacher in 1971

==== Formation ====
During the Mysterians stint, he was approached to join former Terry Knight and the Pack drummer Don Brewer and singer/guitarist Mark Farner – who had been working as the Fabulous Pack but sought to change musical direction – to form a new power trio. Intrigued by the power trio concept, Schacher joined the new lineup, and almost from the moment they played the 1969 Atlanta International Pop Festival, inspiring a rousing reception and fast-spreading word of mouth, they achieved international fame as Grand Funk Railroad.

==== 1970s ====
From 1969 through 1975, Grand Funk was one of the top rock groups in the U.S., managing to hold on despite an acrimonious parting with manager/producer Terry Knight and a musical shift toward a more commercial hard rock. They achieved ten platinum-selling albums and two number 1 hit singles as well as several more top forty hits. In 1976 Grand Funk broke up over musical differences.

Farner, Brewer, and Schacher decided to give Grand Funk another try in 1980. However, Schacher had developed a distaste for flying and elected to stay behind.

==== 1990s-present ====
Schacher spent the intervening years making his way as an investor and occasional musician until, almost by chance, he reteamed with Farner and Brewer in a reunited Grand Funk Railroad in 1996. They recorded a live concert set, Bosnia, and a few new selections for a major anthology project. The original lineup toured until 1998, when Farner left to pursue his solo music career. Schacher and Brewer enlisted veteran musicians Max Carl (38 Special), Bruce Kulick (Kiss) and Tim Cashion (Bob Seger, Robert Palmer) and have continued touring as Grand Funk Railroad from 2000 to 2012 performing 40 shows a year to large audiences all across North America.

== Discography ==
=== with Grand Funk Railroad ===
- On Time (1969)
- Grand Funk (1969)
- Closer to Home (1970)
- Survival (1971)
- E Pluribus Funk (1971)
- Phoenix (1972)
- We're an American Band (1973)
- Shinin' On (1974)
- All the Girls in the World Beware!!! (1974)
- Born to Die (1976)
- Good Singin', Good Playin' (1976)
