= Don Brewer =

American drummer and singer (born 1948)

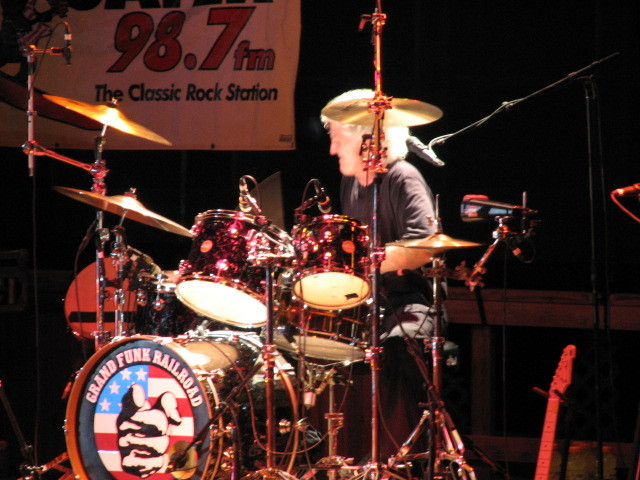
- Brewer performing in 2008

Background information
- Born: Donald George Brewer; September 3, 1948 (age 78); Flint, Michigan, U.S.
- Genres: Rock, hard rock
- Occupation: Musician
- Instruments: Drums, vocals
- Years active: 1964–present
- Labels: Capitol, Lucky Eleven
- Member of: Grand Funk Railroad
- Website: grandfunkrailroad.com/bios/Don_bio.html

Donald George Brewer (born September 3, 1948) is an American drummer and singer who is a founding member and longtime original drummer of the rock band Grand Funk Railroad.

== Early life ==
Brewer was born in Flint, Michigan, on September 3, 1948, the son of Clara Eileen (née Waterman) and Donald A. Brewer, and is a graduate of Swartz Creek High School.

== Early career ==
Brewer started his first band, called The Red Devils, at the age of 12. After leaving The Red Devils, Brewer formed another band named the Jazzmasters for whom he played drums and sang. In 1964, Brewer joined former DJ Terry Knight as well as bassist Herm Jackson, guitarist Curt Johnson, and keyboardist Bobby Caldwell and formed the band Terry Knight and the Pack. In 1966, he experienced his first top 40 hit with "I (Who Have Nothing)".

== Grand Funk Railroad ==
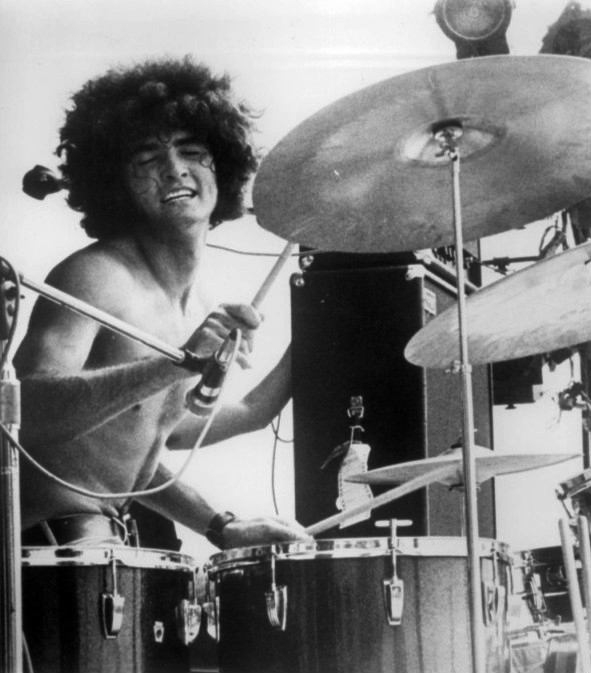
Brewer in 1970

In 1968, Brewer left Terry Knight and the Pack along with bandmate Mark Farner and recruited Mel Schacher, the bassist for the hit band ? and the Mysterians, and formed Grand Funk Railroad. They hired Terry Knight as their manager. Grand Funk Railroad released their first album On Time in 1969 which sold over a million copies. In 1973, Grand Funk released the album We're an American Band, featuring the hit song "We're an American Band". This track, written and sung by Brewer, was the band's first #1 single. Still popular, the song has since been recorded by other artists. In addition to playing drums for Grand Funk, Brewer also provided lead vocals for a number of songs, including the first and third verses of "Some Kind of Wonderful" (1974). Brewer was the baritone lead singer for the group, in contrast to the tenor vocals of Mark Farner. In 1974, the label Qualico released the album Monumental Funk, recorded by Mark Farner and Brewer.

In 1977, following the initial breakup of Grand Funk, Brewer and former Grand Funk bandmates Mel Schacher and Craig Frost formed a new band named Flint, which released one self-titled album in 1978 before disbanding. He also continued in other musical endeavors, including producing for the band The Godz (from Columbus, Ohio) their self-titled debut album The Godz in 1978.

In 1981, Brewer and Farner resurrected Grand Funk for the album Grand Funk Lives that cracked the Billboard albums chart. Two years later, they split again and Brewer joined Bob Seger's Silver Bullet Band. In 1996 Brewer, Schacher, and Farner reunited as Grand Funk. Farner decided to leave the band at the end of 1998 to resume his solo career. In 2000, Brewer and Schacher added vocalist Max Carl, former Kiss guitarist Bruce Kulick and keyboardist Tim Cashion to the line-up. This band toured the U.S. and Canada.

== Other drumming ==
Brewer played the bongo on Frank Zappa's song "Let Me Take You to the Beach" from the album Studio Tan, released in 1978. Brewer was featured in Classic Rock Drum Solos DVD (2007), performing a solo from when he and Grand Funk Railroad sold out Shea Stadium in 1971. In 2000, Brewer performed as a guest clinician at Modern Drummer Magazine's annual Drum Festival event. In 2006, Brewer rejoined Bob Seger & The Silver Bullet Band for their 2006–07 tour; it was his first appearance with the band since he played for them on their 1983 tour. He also played with them on their 2011 tour and during Seger's 2014–2015 Ride Out U.S. concert tour.

== Personal life ==
Brewer lives in Jupiter, Florida, with his wife Sunny Quinn. Together since 1985, Don and Sunny have two daughters and five grandchildren.
