= Sylvie Vartan discography =

Discography of French singer Sylvie Vartan

This page presents the discography of French singer Sylvie Vartan.

== Albums ==
=== Studio albums ===
Title	Year	Peak chart positions			Certifications
Title	Year	FRA	BEL (WA)	SWI	Certifications
Sylvie	1962	—	—	—	
Twiste et chante	1963	—	—	—	
À Nashville	1964	—	—	—	
Gift Wrapped From Paris	1965	—	—	—	
Il y a deux filles en moi	1966	—	—	—	
2'35 de bonheur	1967	—	—	—	
Comme un garçon	1967	—	—	—	
La Maritza	1968	—	—	—	
Aime-moi	1970	—	—	—	
Sympathie	1971	—	—	—	
J'ai un problème	1973	—	—	—	
Je chante pour Swanee	1974	—	—	—	
Shang shang a lang	1974	—	—	—	
Qu'est-ce qui fait pleurer les blondes?	1976	—	—	—	
Ta sorcière bien-aimée	1976	—	—	—	
Georges	1977	—	—	—	
Dancing Star	1977	—	—	—	
Fantaisie	1978	—	—	—	
I Don't Want the Night to End	1979	—	—	—	
Déraisonnable	1979	—	—	—	
Bienvenue solitude	1980	—	—	—	
Ça va mal	1981	—	—	—	
De choses et d'autres	1982	—	—	—	
Danse ta vie	1983	—	—	—	
Des heures de désir	1984	—	—	—	
Made In USA	1985	—	—	—	
Virage	1986	—	—	—	
Confidanses	1989	—	—	—	
Vent d'ouest	1992	—	—	—	
Sessions acoustiques	1994	—	—	—	
Toutes les femmes ont un secret	1996	29	—	—	
Sensible	1998	29	—	—	
Sylvie (2004)	2004	19	58	—	
Nouvelle vague	2007	21	48	—	
Toutes peines confondues	2009	16	31	—	
Soleil bleu	2010	52	—	—	
Sylvie In Nashville	2013	19	38	88	
Une vie en musique	2015	76	111	—	
Avec toi	2018	23	27	40	
Merci pour le regard	2021	17	16	35	

== Singles and EPs ==
=== 1960s ===
Title	Year	Peak chart positions	Certifications	Album
Title	Year	BEL (WA)	Certifications	Album
"Panne d'essence" (with Frankie Jordan)	1961	46		Non-album single
"Quand le film est triste"	1961	29		Sylvie
"Est-ce que tu le sais?"	1962	32		Sylvie
"Qui aurait dit ça"	1962	—		Non-album single
"Baby c'est vous"	1962	—		Sylvie
"Madison Twist"	1962	33		Non-album single
"Le Loco-motion"	1962	6		Sylvie
"Moi je pense encore à toi"	1962	12		Sylvie
"Chance"	1963	33		Non-album single
"En écoutant la pluie"	1963	11		Twiste et chante
"I'm Watching"	1963	8		Twiste et chante
"Twiste et chante"	1963	8		Twiste et chante
"Si je chante"	1963	6		À Nashville
"La plus belle pour aller danser"	1964	3		À Nashville
"Sha la la"	1964	14		Non-album singles
"L'homme en noir"	1964	15		Non-album singles
"Dans tes bras"	1965	26		Non-album singles
"Cette lettre-là"	1965	23		Il y a deux filles en moi
"Quand tu es là"	1965	18		Il y a deux filles en moi
"C'était trop beau"	1965	29		Il y a deux filles en moi
"Il y a 2 filles en moi"	1966	22		Il y a deux filles en moi
"Mister John B"	1966	35		Non-album singles
"Ballade pour un sourire"	1966	17		Non-album singles
"Par amour, par pitié"	1966	2		2'35 de bonheur
"2'35 de bonheur"	1967	9		2'35 de bonheur
"Un peu de tendresse"	1967	12		Non-album single
"Le kid"	1967	19		Comme un garçon
"Comme un garçon"	1968	8		Comme un garçon
"L'oiseau"	1968	27		Comme un garçon
"Baby Capone"	1968	4		Non-album single
"La Maritza"	1968	4		La Maritza
"On a toutes besoin d'un homme"	1969	23		La Maritza
"Buonasera buonasera"	1969	35		Non-album singles
"C'est un jour à rester couché"	1969	25		Non-album singles
"Abracadabra"	1969	16		Aime moi

=== 1970s ===
Title	Year	Peak chart positions		Certifications	Album
Title	Year	BEL (WA)	US Dance	Certifications	Album
"Aime-moi"	1970	23	—		Aime moi
"La chasse à l'homme"	1970	17	—		Non-album singles
"Loup"	1971	22	—		Non-album singles
"Parle-moi de ta vie"	1971	19	—		Sympathie
"Riche"	1971	32	—		Sympathie
"L'heure la plus douce de ma vie"	1972	46	—		Non-album single
"Mon père"	1972	24	—		J'ai un problème
"Non je ne suis plus la même"	1973	30	—		J'ai un problème
"J'ai un problème" (with Johnny Hallyday)	1973	2	—		J'ai un problème
"Toi le garçon"	1973	22	—		Non-album singles
"Bye Bye Leroy Brown"	1974	17	—		Non-album singles
"Da dou ron ron"	1974	27	—		Shang shang a lang
"Shang shang a lang"	1974	24	—		Shang shang a lang
"La drôle de fin"	1975	9	—		Qu'est-ce qui fait pleurer les blondes?
"Danse-la, chante-la"	1975	4	—		Qu'est-ce qui fait pleurer les blondes?
"Qu'est-ce qui fait pleurer les blondes?"	1976	1	—		Qu'est-ce qui fait pleurer les blondes?
"L'amour c'est comme les bateaux"	1976	13	—		Ta sorcière bien-aimée
"Ta sorcière bien aimée"	1976	5	—		Ta sorcière bien-aimée
"Le temps du swing"	1976	5	—		Ta sorcière bien-aimée
"Masculin singulier"	1976	32	—		Ta sorcière bien-aimée
"Petit rainbow"	1977	1	—		Georges
"Georges"	1977	40	—		Georges
"Disco Queen"	1978	—	—		Fantaisie
"Solitude"	1978	—	—		Fantaisie
"Fantaisie"	1978	—	—		Fantaisie
"I Don't Want The Night To End"	1979	—	37		I Don't Want The Night To End
"Easy Love"	1979	—	—		I Don't Want The Night To End
"Nicolas"	1979	—	—		Déraisonnable

=== 1980s ===
Title	Year	Peak chart positions		Certifications	Album
Title	Year	FRA	US	Certifications	Album
"Tape tape"	1980	—	—		Bienvenue solitude
"La chanson au brouillon"	1980	—	—		Bienvenue solitude
"L'amour c'est comme une cigarette"	1981	—	—		Ça va mal
"Orient Express"	1981	—	—		Ça va mal
"La sortie de secours"	1982	—	—		De choses et d'autres
"Marathon Woman"	1982	—	—		De choses et d'autres
"La première fois qu'on s'aimera" (with Michel Sardou)	1983	—	—		Danse ta vie
"Danse ta vie"	1983	—	—		Danse ta vie
"Encore!"	1983	—	—		Non-album single
"Love Again" (with John Denver)	1984	—	85		Des heures de désir
"Des heures de désir"	1984	—	—		Des heures de désir
"Double Exposure	1984	—	—		Des heures de désir
"One Shot Lover"	1985	—	—		Made in USA
"Rien à faire"	1986	—	—		Virage
"Tu n'as rien compris"	1986	—	—		Virage
"Femme sous Influence"	1987	—	—		Non-album single
"C'est fatal"	1989	—	—		Confidanses

=== 1990s-present ===
Title	Year	Peak chart positions	Certifications	Album
Title	Year	FRA	Certifications	Album
"Il pleut sur London"	1990	—		Confidanses
"Quand tu es là"	1990	48		Non-album single
"Qui tu es"	1992	—		Vent d'ouest
"Tes tendres années (Live)"	1993	18		Sessions acoustiques
"Quelqu'un qui m'ressemble"	1995	—		Sessions acoustiques
"Je n'aime encore que toi"	1996	20		Toutes les femmes ont un secret
"Back To L.A."	1996	—		Toutes les femmes ont un secret
"J'aime un homme marié"	1998	—		Sensible
"Les robes"	1999	91		Sensible
"Ce n'est pas rien"	2004	—		Sylvie (2004)
"Je chante le blues"	2009	13		Toutes peines confondues
"L'un part, l'autre reste"	2009	28		Toutes peines confondues
"Je me détacherai" (feat. Doriand)	2010	11		Soleil bleu
