= Music of Dance Dance Revolution Extreme =

Dance Dance Revolution Extreme has a robust soundtrack. It includes many licensed tracks as well as in-house original music that was written and performed by Konami staff.

== Lists of songs ==
=== Arcade (240 songs) ===
The arcade release of Dance Dance Revolution Extreme contains 80 new songs of 240 total, including 11 Club Version songs and three Dancing Stage EuroMix 2 songs. Most of the other new songs are revivals from previous Bemani games. Songs that are not initially available for play are represented with a padlock icon and are only accessible through the use of codes entered into the game's operator menu. The song "Legend of Max" appears on the end credits when the songs are locked.

Most of the songs featured in Extreme returned in subsequent arcade releases:

- Dance Dance Revolution SuperNova features 184 songs from Extreme.
- Dance Dance Revolution SuperNova 2 features 176 songs from Extreme.
- Dance Dance Revolution A and newer feature 147 songs from Extreme.

In SuperNova, the 56 removed songs were 51 licenses and 5 Bemani crossovers. SuperNova 2 introduced a DDR Extreme folder. In Dance Dance Revolution X, songs are divided by mix (1st to Extreme) instead of using a single Extreme folder, a feature maintained in all releases to this day.

| Song | Artist | Availability | |
|---|---|---|---|
| Song | Artist | SN | X / A |
==== New songs (69) ====
| BURNIN' THE FLOOR (MOMO MIX) | NAOKI | | |
| CARTOON HEROES (Speedy Mix) 🎬 | BARBIE YOUNG | | |
| I DO I DO I DO | CREAMY | | |
| IRRESISTIBLEMENT 🎬 | WILDSIDE | | |
| LA COPA DE LA VIDA 🎬 | PATRICK VICTORIO | | |
| SENORITA (Speedy Mix) | JENNY ROM | | |
| SPEED OVER BEETHOVEN 🎬 | ROSE | | |
| WE ARE THE CHAMPIONS (Factory Team Remix) | LIVE 2 LOVE | | |
| WE WILL ROCK YOU | HOUSEBOYZ | | |
| 1998 🎬 | NAOKI | Yes | Yes |
| 321 STARS | DJ SIMON | Yes | Yes |
| A | D.J.Amuro | Yes | Yes |
| Across the nightmare | Jimmy Weckl | Yes | Yes |
| air 🎬 | DJ SIMON | Yes | Yes |
| AM-3P (303 BASS MIX) | KTz (remixed by U1) | Yes | Yes |
| bag | RevenG | Yes | Yes |
| BE LOVIN 🎬 | D-Crew | Yes | Yes |
| Colors (for EXTREME) 🎬 | dj TAKA | Yes | Yes |
| CRASH! | mr.BRIAN & THE FINAL BAND | Yes | |
| CUTIE CHASER (MORNING MIX) | CLUB SPICE | Yes | Yes |
| Dance Dance Revolution | DDR ALL STARS | Yes | Yes |
| Destiny lovers | くにたけみゆき | Yes | Yes |
| Do It Right (Harmonized 2Step Mix) | SOTA feat.Ebony Fay | Yes | |
| DROP THE BOMB (System S.F. Mix) | Scotty D. | Yes | Yes |
| DYNAMITE RAVE (Down Bird SOTA Mix) | NAOKI | Yes | Only available with DDR X in Asia |
| feeling of love | youhei shimizu | Yes | |
| Frozen Ray (for EXTREME) | dj TAKA | Yes | Yes |
| Gamelan de Couple | TOMOSUKE | Yes | Yes |
| GRADUATION ～それぞれの明日～ | BeForU | Yes | Absent in DDR X |
| Happy Wedding 🎬 | ASKA | Yes | Yes |
| Heaven is a '57 metallic gray (gimmix) 🎬 | Sweet little 30's | Yes | Yes |
| HOLD ON ME | tiger YAMATO | Yes | |
| HYPER EUROBEAT | NAOKI feat. DDR ALL STARS | Yes | Yes |
| I'm gonna get you! | Kelly Cosmo | Yes | |
| JANEJANA | T.E.M.P.O. feat.Mohammed & Emi | Yes | Yes |
| JET WORLD | Mutsuhiko Izumi | Yes | Yes |
| Kind Lady | OKUYATOS | Yes | Removed on 28 December 2015, including DDR A |
| KISS KISS KISS | NAOKI feat. SHANTI | Yes | Yes |
| KISS ME ALL NIGHT LONG | MIU | Yes | Yes |
| L'amour et la liberté (DDR ver.) 🎬 | NAOKI underground | Yes | Yes |
| La Bamba 🎬 | Mexican Folk Song (Note: メキシコ民謡) | Yes | Yes |
| Last Message | good-cool feat. Meg | | |
| Look to the Sky (True Color Mix) 🎬 | System S.F. feat.Anna Quinn | Yes | |
| ♥LOVE²シュガ→♥ | dj TAKA feat. のりあ | Yes | |
| LOVE♥SHINE | 小坂りゆ | Yes | Absent in DDR X |
| MEMORIES | NAOKI feat. PAULA TERRY | Yes | Absent in DDR X |
| Miracle Moon ～L.E.D.LIGHT STYLE MIX～ 🎬 | Togo Project feat. Sana | Yes | Yes |
| MOBO★MOGA | Orange Lounge | Yes | |
| PARANOIA survivor 🎬 | 270 | Yes | Yes |
| PARANOIA survivor MAX 🎬 | 290 | Yes | Yes |
| Pink Rose | Kiyommy+Seiya | Yes | Yes |
| SO IN LOVE | Caramel.S | Yes | Yes |
| STAY (Organic house Version) | emi | Yes | Yes |
| stoic (EXTREME version) | TaQ | Yes | Yes |
| sync (EXTREME version) 🎬 | Phase | Yes | Yes |
| TEARS | NAOKI underground feat. EK | Yes | Absent in DDR X |
| The Least 100sec | Hirofumi Sasaki | Yes | Yes |
| The legend of MAX | ZZ | Yes | Yes |
| TRIP MACHINE survivor | DE-SIRE | Yes | Yes |
| TwinBee ～Generation X～ 🎬 | FinalOffset | Yes | Yes |
| V (for EXTREME) | TAKA | Yes | Yes |
| VANITY ANGEL | FIXX | Yes | Yes |
| White Lovers | Sanae Shintani (Note: 亜熱帯マジ-SKA爆弾) | Yes | |
| xenon | Mr.T | Yes | Yes |
| Blue Impulse (for Extreme) (Note: Aoi shoudou (蒼い衝動) ~for EXTREME~) | NAOKI feat. YUKI | Yes | Yes |
| Daikenkai (大見解) 🎬 | Des-ROW feat. TSUBOI for ALPHA | Yes | Yes |
| Magic Door (Theme of Space@Maco) (Note: 魔法の扉 (スペース@マコのテーマ)) | a.s.a | Yes | |
| Calico Cat Rock (三毛猫ロック) | Anettai Maji-Ska Bakudan (Note: 亜熱帯マジ-SKA爆弾) | Yes | Yes |
| Sakura (桜) 🎬 | Reven-G | Yes | Yes |
==== DDRMAX2 Dance Dance Revolution 7thMIX (43) ====
| FANTASY | LOCKOUT | | |
| IT'S RAINING MEN (Almighty Mix) | GERI HALLIWELL | | |
| LITTLE BOY (BOY ON BOY MIX) | CAPTAIN JACK | | |
| LIVING IN AMERICA | JOHN DESIRE | | |
| LONG TRAIN RUNNIN' | BUS STOP | | |
| MAXIMUM OVERDRIVE (KC Club Mix) | 2 UNLIMITED | | |
| THE REFLEX | DURAN DURAN | | |
| THERE YOU'LL BE | DJ SPEEDO feat. ANGELICA | | |
| WAKA LAKA | JENNY ROM vs ZIPPERS | | |
| Burning Heat! (3 Option Mix) | Mr.T with Motoaki F. | Yes | Yes |
| BRE∀K DOWN! | BeForU | Yes | |
| CANDY♥ 🎬 | 小坂りゆ | Yes | |
| D2R | NAOKI | Yes | Yes |
| DESTINY | NAOKI feat. PAULA TERRY | Yes | Yes |
| DIVE TO THE NIGHT | 小坂りゆ | Yes | Yes |
| ever snow | YOMA KOMATSU | Yes | |
| i feel ... | AKIRA YAMAOKA | Yes | Yes |
| MAXX UNLIMITED | Z | Yes | Yes |
| rain of sorrow | NM feat. Ebony Fay | Yes | Yes |
| Secret Rendez-vous | DIVAS | Yes | Yes |
| Spin the disc | good-cool | | |
| Sweet Sweet ♥ Magic 🎬 | jun | Yes | Yes |
| TSUGARU | RevenG VS DE-SIRE | Yes | Yes |
| 革命 | dj TAKA with NAOKI | Yes | Yes |
| AFRONOVA (FROM NONSTOP MEGAMIX) 🎬 | RE-VENGE | Yes | Yes |
| AM-3P (AM EAST mix) | kTz | Yes | Yes |
| B4U (B4 ZA BEAT MIX) | NAOKI | Yes | Yes |
| BRILLIANT 2U (K.O.G G3 MIX) 🎬 | NAOKI | Yes | Yes |
| BURNIN' THE FLOOR (BLUE FIRE mix) 🎬 | NAOKI | Yes | Yes |
| CELEBRATE NITE (EURO TRANCE STYLE) | N.M.R | Yes | Yes |
| DROP OUT (FROM NONSTOP MEGAMIX) | NW260 | Yes | Yes |
| DYNAMITE RAVE (B4 ZA BEAT MIX) 🎬 | NAOKI | Yes | Yes |
| ECSTASY (midnight blue mix) | d-compleX | Yes | Yes |
| HIGHER (next morning mix) | NM feat. SUNNY | Yes | Yes |
| HYSTERIA 2001 | NM | Yes | Yes |
| MY SUMMER LOVE (TOMMY'S SMILE MIX) | mitsu-O! with GEILA | Yes | Yes |
| Silent Hill (3rd Christmas mix) | THOMAS HOWARD | Yes | Yes |
| SEXY PLANET (FROM NONSTOP MEGAMIX) 🎬 | Crystal Aliens | Yes | Yes |
| STILL IN MY HEART (MOMO MIX) | NAOKI | Yes | Yes |
| SUPER STAR (FROM NONSTOP MEGAMIX) | D.J.RICH feat. Tailbros. | Yes | Yes |
| TSUGARU (APPLE MIX) | RevenG VS DE-SIRE | Yes | Yes |
| WILD RUSH (FROM NONSTOP MEGAMIX) | FACTOR-X | Yes | Yes |
| 祭 JAPAN (FROM NONSTOP MEGAMIX) | RE-VENGE | Yes | |
==== DDRMAX Dance Dance Revolution 6thMIX (37) ====
| COW GIRL | BAMBEE | | |
| DO YOU REMEMBER ME | JENNY | | |
| FANTASY | MELISSA | | |
| HIGHS OFF U (Scorccio XY Mix) | 4 REEEL | | |
| I'M IN THE MOOD FOR DANCING | SHARON | | |
| LET'S GROOVE | TIPS & TRICKS VS WISDOME | | |
| LOVIN' YOU (ROB SEARLE CLUB MIX) | VINYL BABY | | |
| MIRACLE | ST.JENNARO | | |
| MY SWEET DARLIN' | WILDSIDE | | |
| NORI NORI NORI | JUDY CRYSTAL | | |
| ORDINARY WORLD | AURORA featuring NAMIEE COLEMAN | | |
| SO DEEP (PERFECT SPHERE REMIX) | SILVERTEAR | | |
| SOMEWHERE OVER THE RAINBOW | COSMIC GATE | | |
| TELEPHONE OPERATOR (Club MIX) | SHELLEY PETER | | |
| The Centre of the Heart (STONEBRIDGE CLUBMIX) | Roxette | | |
| TWILIGHT ZONE (R-C Extended Club MIX) | 2 UNLIMITED | | |
| WWW.BLONDE GIRL (MOMO MIX) | JENNY ROM | | |
| WITCH DOCTOR (GIANTS TOONS VERSION) | CARTOONS | | |
| そばかす FRECKLES (KCP Re-Edit) | TIGGY | | |
| 夜空ノムコウ | EUROBEAT LOVERS | | |
| CANDY☆ | Luv UNLIMITED | Yes | Yes |
| DIVE(more deep & deeper style) | Be For U | Yes | |
| Do It Right | SOTA feat. Ebony Fay | Yes | |
| exotic ethnic | RevenG | Yes | Yes |
| Firefly | BeForU | Yes | |
| Groove | Sho-T feat. Brenda | Yes | |
| Groove 2001 | Sho-T feat. Brenda | Yes | |
| Healing Vision (Angelic mix) | 2MB | Yes | Yes |
| Let the beat hit em! (CLASSIC R&B STYLE) | STONE BROS. | Yes | Yes |
| Look to the Sky | System S.F. feat.ANNA | Yes | |
| MAX 300 | Ω | Yes | Yes |
| Midnite Blaze | U1 Jewel Style | Yes | |
| ON THE JAZZ | Jonny Dynamite! | Yes | |
| ORION.78 ～civilization mix～ | 2MB | Yes | Yes |
| Share My Love | Julie Frost | Yes | |
| true... (radio edit) | 小坂りゆ | Yes | X only |
| true... (trance sunrise mix) | 小坂りゆ | Yes | X only |
==== DanceDanceRevolution 5thMIX (17) ====
| CAN'T STOP FALLIN' IN LOVE (SPEED MIX) | NAOKI | | |
| ABSOLUTE | dj TAKA | | |
| Abyss | dj TAKA | | |
| AFRONOVA PRIMEVAL 🎬 | 8bit | | |
| BROKEN MY HEART | NAOKI feat. PAULA TERRY | | |
| DXY! | TaQ | | |
| ECSTASY | d-complex | | |
| Electro Tuned (the SubS mix) | TaQ | | |
| Healing Vision | DE-SIRE | | |
| INSERTiON | NAOKI underground | | |
| I Was The One | good-cool | | |
| Mr.T. (take me higher) | Risky Men feat. Asuka M | | |
| PARANOiA ETERNAL | STM200 | | |
| Remember You | NM feat. Julie | | |
| STILL IN MY HEART | NAOKI | | |
| 祭 JAPAN | RE-VENGE | | |
| サナ・モレッテ・ネ・エンテ | Togo Project feat. Sana | | |
==== DanceDanceRevolution 4thMIX (16) ====
| .59 | dj TAKA | | |
| B4U | NAOKI | | |
| BABY BABY GIMME YOUR LOVE | DIVAS | | |
| BURNIN' THE FLOOR 🎬 | NAOKI | | |
| Don't Stop! (AMD 2nd MIX) | Dr.VIBE feat. JP miles | | |
| era (nostalmix) | TaQ | | |
| HIGHER | NM feat. SUNNY | | |
| Holic | TaQ | | |
| LEADING CYBER | dj TAKA | | |
| LOVE AGAIN TONIGHT (For Melissa MIX) | NAOKI feat. PAULA TERRY | | |
| MY SUMMER LOVE | mitsu-O! with GEILA | | |
| ORION.78 (AMeuro-MIX) | RE-VENGE | | |
| RHYTHM AND POLICE (K.O.G G3 MIX) | CJ CREW feat. CHRISTIAN D. | | |
| SAINT GOES MARCHING (REMIX) | THE SAINT | | |
| SYNCHRONIZED LOVE (Red Monster Hyper Mix) | JOE RINOIE | | |
| TRIP MACHINE CLIMAX | DE-SIRE | | |
==== DanceDanceRevolution 3rdMIX (20) ====
| CAPTAIN JACK (GRANDALE REMIX) | CAPTAIN JACK | | |
| CUTIE CHASER | CLUB SPICE | | |
| DAM DARIRAM | JOGA | | |
| AFRONOVA | RE-VENGE | | |
| AFTER THE GAME OF LOVE | NPD3 | | |
| DEAD END | N&S | | |
| DROP THE BOMB | Scotty D. | | |
| DYNAMITE RAVE 🎬 | NAOKI | | |
| END OF THE CENTURY | NO.9 | | |
| gentle stress (AMD SEXUAL MIX) | MR.DOG feat. DJ SWAN | Removed in SuperNova 2 | |
| GRADIUSIC CYBER (AMD G5 MIX) | BIG-O feat. TAKA | | |
| Jam Jam Reggae (AMD SWING MIX) | RICE.C feat. Jam Master'73 | Removed in SuperNova 2 | |
| La Senorita | CAPTAIN.T | | |
| La Señorita Virtual | 2MB | | |
| LOVE THIS FEELIN' | Chang Ma | | |
| LUV TO ME (AMD MIX) | DJ KAZU feat. tiger YAMATO | | |
| PARANOiA Rebirth | 190' | | |
| Silent Hill | THOMAS HOWARD | | |
| think ya better D | sAmi | | |
| TRIP MACHINE (LuvMIX) | 2MB | | |
==== DanceDanceRevolution Solo (9) ====
| SKY HIGH | DJ MIKO | | |
| CAN'T STOP FALLIN' IN LOVE | NAOKI | | |
| CELEBRATE NITE | N.M.R | | |
| DROP OUT | NW260 | | |
| HYSTERIA | NAOKI 190 | | |
| PARANOIA EVOLUTION | 200 | | |
| SEXY PLANET 🎬 | CRYSTAL ALIENS | | |
| SUPER STAR | D.J.RICH feat. Tailbros. | | |
| WILD RUSH | FACTOR-X | | |
==== DanceDanceRevoution 2ndMIX CLUB version (11) ====
| 20, November | DJ nagureo | Removed in SuperNova 2 | |
| 5.1.1. | dj nagureo | Yes | |
| Be in my paradise | JJ COMPANY | Removed in SuperNova 2 | |
| celebrate | JJ COMPANY | Removed in SuperNova 2 | |
| Dr.LOVE | baby weapon feat.Asuka.M | Removed in SuperNova 2 | |
| e-motion | e.o.s | Yes | Yes |
| GENOM SCREAMS | L.E.D.LIGHT | Yes | Yes |
| Jam Jam Reggae | Jam Master'73 | Removed in SuperNova 2 | |
| LUV TO ME | tiger YAMATO | Yes | |
| R3 | tiger YAMATO | Yes | |
| ska a go go | THE BALD HEADS | Removed in SuperNova 2 | |
==== DanceDanceRevolution 2ndMIX (12) ====
| EL RITMO TROPICAL | DIXIES GANG | | |
| GET UP'N MOVE | S&K | | |
| I believe in miracles | HI-RISE | | |
| IF YOU WERE HERE | JENNIFER | | |
| AM-3P | KTz | | |
| BRILLIANT 2U 🎬 | NAOKI | | |
| BRILLIANT 2U (Orchestra Groove) | NAOKI | | |
| KEEP ON MOVIN' | N.M.R | | |
| PARANOiA KCET (clean mix) | 2MB | | |
| PARANOiA MAX (DIRTY MIX) | 190 | | |
| PUT YOUR FAITH IN ME | UZI-LAY | | |
| SP-TRIP MACHINE (JUNGLE MIX) | DE-SIRE | | |
==== DanceDanceRevolution (6) ====
| BUTTERFLY | SMiLE.dk | | |
| LET'S GET DOWN | JT PLAYAZ | | |
| LITTLE BITCH | THE SPECIALS | | |
| MAKE IT BETTER | mitsu-O! | | |
| PARANOiA 🎬 | 180 | | |
| TRIP MACHINE | DE-SIRE | | |

Legend:

- 🎬 This song features a unique game video in Dance Dance Revolution Extreme 2 for the PlayStation 2.

=== PlayStation 2 ===
The PlayStation 2 release of Dance Dance Revolution Extreme contains 111 songs. In the same vein as the arcade release, the PlayStation 2 release contains a number of popular songs from past games which is uncommon in Japanese console releases. New to the series songs are in green, songs from other Bemani series are in yellow, songs originally from console DDR games, DDR Solo, and DDR 2ndMix Club Version are in purple, songs from previous DDR games are in blue, and Boss songs are in red. New Konami Originals that are not on the arcade soundtrack receive special coloring: DDR Originals are in pink, while BEMANI crossover songs are in orange. Songs that are not initially available are represented with a padlock icon and require certain conditions in-game to be met before they can be played.

Dance Dance Revolution Extreme PlayStation 2 version soundtrack

| Song | Artist | Note |
New songs (17 total)
| "GRADUATION ~それぞれの明日~" (GRADUATION ~Sorezore no Ashita~) | BeForU | from Dance Dance Revolution Extreme |
| "1998" | NAOKI | from Dance Dance Revolution Extreme |
| "LA COPA DE LA VIDA" | PATRICK VICTORIO | from Dancemania SPORTS cover of Ricky Martin |
| "LOVE♥SHINE" | 小坂りゆ | from Dance Dance Revolution Extreme |
| "WE ARE THE CHAMPIONS (Factory Team Remix)" | LIVE 2 LOVE | from Dancemania SPORTS cover of Queen |
| "WE WILL ROCK YOU" | HOUSEBOYZ | from Dancemania SPORTS cover of Queen |
| "I DO I DO I DO" | CREAMY | from Dancemania EX1 |
| "HYPER EUROBEAT" | NAOKI feat. DDR ALL STARS | from Dance Dance Revolution Extreme |
| "MEMORIES" | NAOKI feat. PAULA TERRY | from Dancing Stage EuroMix 2 |
| "VANITY ANGEL" | FIXX | from Dancing Stage EuroMix 2 |
| "CRASH!" | mr. BRIAN & THE FINAL BAND | from Dancing Stage EuroMix 2 |
| "SPEED OVER BEETHOVEN" | ROSE | from Dancemania SPEED 9 |
| "IRRESISTIBLEMENT" | WILDSIDE | from Dancemania SPEED 9 |
| "BURNIN' THE FLOOR (MOMO MIX)" | NAOKI | from Dancemania SPEED 9 |
| "CARTOON HEROES (Speedy Mix)" | BARBIE YOUNG | from Dancemania SPEED 9 cover of Aqua |
| "TEARS" | NAOKI underground feat. EK | from Dance Dance Revolution Extreme |
| "bag" | RevenG | from Dance Dance Revolution Extreme |
Arcade BEMANI crossovers (38 total)
| "HOLD ON ME" | tiger YAMATO | from Para Para Paradise |
| "Miracle Moon ~L.E.D. LIGHT STYLE MIX~" | Togo Project feat. Sana | from beatmania APPEND 5thMix |
| "Happy Wedding" | ASKA | from beatmania IIDX 7th Style |
| "White Lovers" | 新谷さなえ | from pop'n music 7 |
| "air" | DJ SIMON | from beatmania 6thMix |
| "I'm gonna get you!" | Kelly Cosmo | from GuitarFreaks 4thMix & DrumMania 3rdMix |
| "JANEJANA" | T.E.M.P.O. feat. Mohammed & Emi | from Dance ManiaX |
| "三毛猫ロック" (Mikeneko Rock) | 亜熱帯マジ-SKA爆弾 | from GuitarFreaks 8thMix & DrumMania 7thMix |
| "Pink Rose" | Kiyommy+Seiya | from Keyboardmania 3rdMix |
| "♥Love²シュガ→♥" (♥Love²Sugar→♥) | dj TAKA feat. のりあ | from pop'n music 8 |
| "STAY (Organic house Version)" | emi | from Dance ManiaX 2ndMix |
| "Destiny lovers" | くにたけ みゆき | from GuitarFreaks 7thMix & DrumMania 6thMix |
| "蒼い衝動 (for EXTREME)" (Aoi Shōudōu (for EXTREME)) | NAOKI feat. YUKI | from beatmania IIDX 8th Style |
| "feeling of love" | youhei shimizu | from beatmania III |
| "KISS ME ALL NIGHT LONG" | NAOKI J-STYLE feat.MIU | from Dance ManiaX 2ndMix |
| "Last Message" | good-cool feat. Meg | from beatmania IIDX 7th Style |
| "MOBO☆MOGA" | Orange Lounge | from Dance ManiaX |
| "Gamelan de Couple" | TOMOSUKE | from Mambo a Go Go |
| "LA BAMBA" | メキシコ民謡 | from Mambo a Go Go cover of the classic Mexican folk song of the same name |
| "Colors (for EXTREME)" | dj TAKA | from beatmania IIDX 6th Style |
| "KISS KISS KISS" | NAOKI feat. SHANTI | from Dance ManiaX 2ndMix |
| "魔法の扉 (スペース☆マコのテーマ)" (Mahōu no Tobira (SPACE@MACO no Theme)) | a.s.a. | from pop'n stage |
| "BE LOVIN" | D-Crew | from beatmania 7thMix |
| "L'amour et la liberté (DDR ver.)" | NAOKI underground | from beatmania IIDX 6th Style |
| "Frozen Ray (for EXTREME)" | dj TAKA | from Keyboardmania 3rdMix |
| "JET WORLD" | Mutsuhiko Izumi | from GuitarFreaks 2ndMix & DrumMania |
| "大見解" (Daikenkai) | Des-ROW feat. TSUBOI for ALPHA | from pop'n music 6 |
| "V (for EXTREME)" | TAKA | from beatmania IIDX 5th Style |
| "TwinBee ~Generation X~" | FinalOffset | from beatmania III |
| "Heaven is a '57 metallic gray (gimmix)" | Hiro feat. Sweet little 30's | from Dance ManiaX |
| "321STARS" | DJ SIMON | from beatmania CompleteMix 2 |
| "A" | D.J.Amuro | from beatmania IIDX 7th Style |
| "stoic (EXTREME version)" | TaQ | from beatmania IIDX 7th Style |
| "sync (EXTREME version)" | OutPhase | from beatmania IIDX 5th Style |
| "Across the nightmare" | Jimmy Weckl | from GuitarDreak 2ndMix & Drummania |
| "xenon" | Mr. T | from beatmania IIDX 8th Style |
| "The Least 100sec" | Hirofumi Sasaki | from GuitarFreaks 5thMix & DrumMania 4thMix |
| "桜" (Sakura) | RevenG | from beatmania IIDX 8th Style |
Returning songs (15 total)
| "AFTER THE GAME OF LOVE" | NPD3 | from Dance Dance Revolution 3rdMix (PS) |
| "think ya better D" | sAmi | from Dance Dance Revolution 2ndMix (PS) |
| "DROP THE BOMB" | Scotty D. | from Dance Dance Revolution 3rdMix (PS) |
| "SEXY PLANET" | Crystal Aliens | from Dancing Stage featuring True Kiss Destination |
| "WILD RUSH" | FACTOR-X | from Dance Dance Revolution Solo 2000 |
| "SUPER STAR" | D.J.RICH feat. TAILBROS. | from Dance Dance Revolution Solo Bass Mix |
| "LUV TO ME (disco mix)" | tiger YAMATO | from beatmania IIDX |
| "LOVE THIS FEELIN'" | Chang ma | from Dance Dance Revolution 2ndReMix (PS) |
| "PARANOiA KCET (clean mix)" | 2MB | from Dance Dance Revolution (PS) |
| "Healing Vision (Angelic mix)" | 2MB | from Dance Dance Revolution 5thMix (PS) |
| "PARANOIA EVOLUTION" | 200 | from Dance Dance Revolution Solo BASS Mix |
| "La Señorita Virtual" | 2MB | from Dance Dance Revolution 3rdMix (PS) |
| "R3" | tiger YAMATO | from beatmania IIDX |
| "ORION.78 ~civilization mix~" | 2MB | from Dance Dance Revolution 4thMix (PS) |
| "TRIP MACHINE (LuvMIX)" | 2MB | from Dance Dance Revolution 2ndReMix (PS) |
Returning Arcade songs (25 total)
| "BABY BABY GIMME YOUR LOVE" | DIVAS | from Dance Dance Revolution 4thMix |
| "PUT YOUR FAITH IN ME" | UZI-LAY | from Dance Dance Revolution 2ndMix |
| "HIGHER" | NM feat. SUNNY | from Dance Dance Revolution 4thMix |
| "Silent Hill" | THOMAS HOWARD | from Dance Dance Revolution 3rdMix |
| "BRILLIANT 2U" | NAOKI | from Dance Dance Revolution 2ndMix |
| "KEEP ON MOVIN'" | N.M.R | from Dance Dance Revolution 2ndMix |
| "MY SUMMER LOVE" | mitsu-O! with GEILA | from Dance Dance Revolution 4thMix |
| "ECSTASY" | d-complex | from Dance Dance Revolution 5thMix |
| "BRILLIANT 2U (Orchestra Groove)" | NAOKI | from Dance Dance Revolution 2ndMix |
| "Healing Vision" | DE-SIRE | from Dance Dance Revolution 5thMix |
| "革命" (Kakumei) | dj TAKA with NAOKI | from DDRMAX2 Dance Dance Revolution 7thMix |
| "MAKE IT BETTER" | mitsu-O! | from Dance Dance Revolution |
| "La Senorita" | CAPTAIN.T | from Dance Dance Revolution 3rdMix |
| "CAN'T STOP FALLIN' IN LOVE (SPEED MIX)" | NAOKI | from Dance Dance Revolution 5thMix from Dancemania SPEED 6 |
| "DYNAMITE RAVE" | NAOKI | from Dance Dance Revolution 3rdMix |
| "PARANOiA ETERNAL" | STM 200 | from Dance Dance Revolution 5thMix |
| "TRIP MACHINE CLIMAX" | DE-SIRE | from Dance Dance Revolution 4thMix |
| "AFRONOVA" | RE-VENGE | from Dance Dance Revolution 3rdMix |
| "SP-TRIP MACHINE (JUNGLE MIX)" | DE-SIRE | from Dance Dance Revolution 2ndMix |
| "TRIP MACHINE" | DE-SIRE | from Dance Dance Revolution |
| "PARANOiA Rebirth" | 190' | from Dance Dance Revolution 3rdMix |
| "PARANOiA" | 180 | from Dance Dance Revolution |
| "PARANOiA MAX (DIRTY MIX)" | 190 | from Dance Dance Revolution 2ndMix |
| "MAX 300" | Ω | from DDRMAX Dance Dance Revolution 6thMix |
| "MAXX UNLIMITED" | Z | from DDRMAX2 Dance Dance Revolution 7thMix |
Console BEMANI crossovers (4 total)
| "more deep(ver.2.1)" | Togo Project feat. Sana | from beatmania IIDX 5th Style (PS2) |
| "Bad Routine" | D.J. Spugna | from beatmania IIDX 7th Style |
| "Keep On Liftin'" | dj nagureo | from beatmania III |
| "Tomorrow Perfume" | dj TAKA | from beatmania IIDX 7th Style |
Console Konami Originals (6 total)
| "A Stupid Barber" | Sho-T | New Konami Original |
| "Scorching Moon" | Shawn the Horny Master | New Konami Original |
| "Forever Sunshine" | Chel Y. | from DDRMAX2 Dance Dance Revolution |
| "I Need You" | Supa Fova feat. Jenny F. | from DDRMAX2 Dance Dance Revolution |
| "Try 2 Luv. U" | S.F.M.P. | from DDRMAX2 Dance Dance Revolution |
| "un deux trois" | SDMS | New Konami Original |
Boss songs (6 total)
| "Dance Dance Revolution" | DDR ALL STARS | from Dance Dance Revolution Extreme; Accessible as ONE MORE EXTRA STAGE |
| "TRIP MACHINE survivor" | DE-SIRE | from Dance Dance Revolution Extreme; Accessible as SEMI-FINAL STAGE |
| "PARANOiA survivor" | 270 | from Dance Dance Revolution Extreme; Accessible as FINAL STAGE |
| "PARANOiA survivor MAX" | 290 | from Dance Dance Revolution Extreme; Accessible as FINAL STAGE |
| "The legend of MAX" | ZZ | from Dance Dance Revolution Extreme; Accessible as EXTRA STAGE |
| "MAX.(period)" | 2MB | New Konami Original; Accessible as EXTRA STAGE |

== Lists of courses ==
=== Nonstop ===
Dance Dance Revolution Extreme reintroduced Nonstop courses for the first time since Dance Dance Revolution 4thMix Plus, with some improvements: the ability to select between two levels of difficulty, and the ability to use modifiers during the course. However, it is no longer possible to use a memory card to customize the song list and order of Nonstop courses. Some Nonstop courses use data collected by the game to determine the songs they contain, while others select songs at random. All Nonstop courses have four songs that are played back to back without rest between them, and use the standard life bar as in normal gameplay.

| Course | Song title | Normal level | | Difficult level | | Unlock level |
| Course | Song title | Single | Double | Single | Double | Unlock level |
|---|---|---|---|---|---|---|
| Pop 4 🕹️ | 1. "Irrésistiblement" | 3 | 3 | 6 | 6 | —N/a |
| Pop 4 🕹️ | 2. "Cartoon Heroes (Speedy Mix)" | 4 | 4 | 7 | 7 | —N/a |
| Pop 4 🕹️ | 3. "I'm Gonna Get You!" | 5 | 5 | 7 | 7 | —N/a |
| Pop 4 🕹️ | 4. "I Do I Do I Do" | 5 | 5 | 8 | 8 | —N/a |
| Dancemania -Nonstop- | 1. "Butterfly" | 3 | 4 | 4 | 5 | —N/a |
| Dancemania -Nonstop- | 2. "If You Were Here" | 5 | 6 | 6 | 7 | —N/a |
| Dancemania -Nonstop- | 3. "Sky High" | 4 | 5 | 7 | 7 | —N/a |
| Dancemania -Nonstop- | 4. "Dam Dariram" | 6 | 5 | 8 | 8 | —N/a |
| Macho | 1. "We Will Rock You" | 5 | 5 | 7 | 7 | —N/a |
| Macho | 2. "Telephone Operator (Club Mix)" | 5 | 5 | 7 | 7 | —N/a |
| Macho | 3. "Crash!" | 5 | 5 | 8 | 8 | —N/a |
| Macho | 4. "Captain Jack (Grandale Remix)" | 7 | 7 | 9 | 9 | —N/a |
| House | 1. "I Was The One" | 3 | 3 | 5 | 5 | —N/a |
| House | 2. "Don't Stop! (AMD 2nd Mix)" | 4 | 3 | 5 | 4 | —N/a |
| House | 3. "Mr.T. (Take Me Higher)" | 5 | 5 | 7 | 7 | —N/a |
| House | 4. "Feeling of Love" | 5 | 5 | 7 | 7 | —N/a |
| Love Heart | 1. "♥Love²Sugar→♥" | 4 | 3 | 5 | 5 | —N/a |
| Love Heart | 2. "Love♥Shine" | 4 | 3 | 4 | 4 | —N/a |
| Love Heart | 3. "Candy♥" | 3 | 3 | 5 | 5 | —N/a |
| Love Heart | 4. "Sweet Sweet ♥ Magic" | 3 | 3 | 6 | 6 | —N/a |
| Player's Best 1-4 🕹️ | Songs 1 to 4 in the most played list | ? | ? | ? | ? | —N/a |
| Player's Best 5-8 🕹️ | Songs 5 to 8 in the most played list | ? | ? | ? | ? | —N/a |
| Player's Best 9-12 🕹️ | Songs 9 to 12 in the most played list | ? | ? | ? | ? | —N/a |
| Player's Best 13-16 🕹️ | Songs 13 to 16 in the most played list | ? | ? | ? | ? | —N/a |
| Player's Best 17-20 🕹️ | Songs 17 to 20 in the most played list | ? | ? | ? | ? | —N/a |
| Player's Worst 🕹️ | Songs 1 to 4 in the least played list | ? | ? | ? | ? | —N/a |
| Random Dancemania | Four licensed songs chosen at random | ? | ? | ? | ? | —N/a |
| Random Bemani | Four Bemani songs chosen at random | ? | ? | ? | ? | —N/a |
| Random All 🕹️ | Four songs chosen at random | ? | ? | ? | ? | —N/a |
| Random Caprice 🕹️ | Four songs chosen at random | ? | ? | ? | ? | —N/a |
| The First | 1. "Butterfly" | 3 | 4 | 4 | 5 | 1st Pass |
| The First | 2. "Let's Get Down" | 3 | 3 | 4 | 4 | 1st Pass |
| The First | 3. "Little Bitch" | 4 | 5 | 5 | 6 | 1st Pass |
| The First | 4. "Paranoia" | 6 | 7 | 7 | 8 | 1st Pass |
| Fine Choice -nonstop- | 1. "I'm in the Mood for Dancing" | 5 | 4 | 8 | 7 | 1st Pass |
| Fine Choice -nonstop- | 2. "Happy Wedding" | 5 | 5 | 7 | 6 | 1st Pass |
| Fine Choice -nonstop- | 3. "Senorita (Speedy Mix)" | 6 | 6 | 1 | 1 | 1st Pass |
| Fine Choice -nonstop- | 4. "Destiny Lovers" | 5 | 5 | 8 | 8 | 1st Pass |
| Hop Step | 1. "Candy✩" | 5 | 6 | 8 | 9 | 1st Pass |
| Hop Step | 2. "TwinBee ~Generation X~" | 6 | 6 | 8 | 8 | 1st Pass |
| Hop Step | 3. "Witch Doctor (Giant Toons Version)" | 4 | 6 | 8 | 8 | 1st Pass |
| Hop Step | 4. "321Stars" | 6 | 7 | 8 | 8 | 1st Pass |
| from Dance Maniax 🕹️ | 1. "Mobo★Moga" | 6 | 6 | 7 | 7 | 3rd Pass |
| from Dance Maniax 🕹️ | 2. "Stay (Organic House Mix)" | 6 | 5 | 7 | 7 | 3rd Pass |
| from Dance Maniax 🕹️ | 3. "Kiss Kiss Kiss" | 5 | 5 | 8 | 8 | 3rd Pass |
| from Dance Maniax 🕹️ | 4. "Heaven is a '57 Metallic Gray (Gimmix)" | 6 | 6 | 8 | 8 | 3rd Pass |
| 春夏秋冬 (Four Seasons) | 1. "Graduation~それぞれの明日" | 2 | 2 | 5 | 5 | 3rd Pass |
| 春夏秋冬 (Four Seasons) | 2. "My Summer Love" | 3 | 3 | 6 | 5 | 3rd Pass |
| 春夏秋冬 (Four Seasons) | 3. "Firefly" | 1 | 2 | 5 | 5 | 3rd Pass |
| 春夏秋冬 (Four Seasons) | 4. "White Lovers" | 2 | 2 | 4 | 5 | 3rd Pass |
| from beatmania 🕹️ | 1. "Miracle Moon ~L.E.D.Light Style Mix~" | 5 | 5 | 7 | 7 | 3rd Pass |
| from beatmania 🕹️ | 2. "air" | 5 | 5 | 7 | 8 | 3rd Pass |
| from beatmania 🕹️ | 3. "Be Lovin" | 6 | 6 | 9 | 8 | 3rd Pass |
| from beatmania 🕹️ | 4. "321Stars" | 6 | 7 | 8 | 8 | 3rd Pass |
| Euro Beat | 1. "Hold On Me" | 5 | 5 | 6 | 6 | 5th Pass |
| Euro Beat | 2. "Nori Nori Nori" | 5 | 5 | 8 | 8 | 5th Pass |
| Euro Beat | 3. "Hyper Eurobeat" | 4 | 6 | 7 | 8 | 5th Pass |
| Euro Beat | 4. "Last Message" | 6 | 6 | 7 | 7 | 5th Pass |
| from Pop'n Music 🕹️ | 1. "♥Love²Sugar→♥" | 5 | 5 | 7 | 7 | 5th Pass |
| from Pop'n Music 🕹️ | 2. "White Lovers" | 4 | 5 | 7 | 8 | 5th Pass |
| from Pop'n Music 🕹️ | 3. "Magic Door (Theme of Space@Maco)" | 5 | 5 | 8 | 8 | 5th Pass |
| from Pop'n Music 🕹️ | 4. "Daikenkai" | 6 | 5 | 8 | 8 | 5th Pass |
| Funky Groove | 1. "Let's Groove" | 5 | 4 | 6 | 7 | 5th Pass |
| Funky Groove | 2. "Miracle" | 5 | 5 | 7 | 8 | 5th Pass |
| Funky Groove | 3. "Long Train Runnin'" | 5 | 5 | 7 | 7 | 5th Pass |
| Funky Groove | 4. "Get Up'n Move" | 7 | 7 | 8 | 7 | 5th Pass |
| 家庭用DDRコース (Home DDR Course) | 1. ""Drop the Bomb (System S.F. Mix)" | 5 | 5 | 7 | 6 | 7th Pass (Final) |
| 家庭用DDRコース (Home DDR Course) | 2. "Do It Right (Harmonized 2Step Mix)" | 6 | 5 | 7 | 7 | 7th Pass (Final) |
| 家庭用DDRコース (Home DDR Course) | 3. "Look to the Sky (True Color Mix)" | 6 | 5 | 7 | 7 | 7th Pass (Final) |
| 家庭用DDRコース (Home DDR Course) | 4. "Dynamite Rave (Down Bird Sota Mix)" | 5 | 5 | 7 | 7 | 7th Pass (Final) |

Notes:

- 🕹️ indicates that the course is available on the Japanese PlayStation 2 version.
- In the arcade version, all six Player's courses and all four Random courses may feature Challenge steps instead of Standard or Heavy steps, when Challenge-only songs are featured in a course.

The PlayStation 2 version features 12 courses that are identical to the arcade version. Additionally, two courses on the PlayStation 2 replace one song compared to their arcade counterparts:

- 春夏秋冬 (Four Seasons) features "Can't Stop Fallin' In Love (Speed Mix)" instead of "Firefly".
- Euro Beat features "Burnin' the Floor (Momo Mix)" instead of "Nori Nori Nori".

Dance Dance Revolution Extreme Japanese PlayStation 2 Nonstop courses
| Nonstop | Normal | Difficult |
|---|---|---|
| Macho | 1. "We Will Rock You" | 1. "We Will Rock You" |
| Macho | 2. "Super Star" | 2. "Super Star" |
| Macho | 3. "Crash !" | 3. "Crash !" |
| Macho | 4. "Afronova" | 4. "Afronova" |
| House | 1. "Higher" | 1. "Higher" |
| House | 2. "Think Ya Better D" | 2. "Think Ya Better D" |
| House | 3. "Bad Routine" | 3. "Bad Routine" |
| House | 4. "Feeling of Love" | 4. "Feeling of Love" |
| Love Heart | 1. "♥ Love² Syuga→ ♥" | 1. "♥ Love² Syuga→ ♥" |
| Love Heart | 2. "Love ♥ Shine" | 2. "Love ♥ Shine" |
| Love Heart | 3. "Mahou no Tobira (Space * Mako no Theme)" | 3. "Mahou no Tobira (Space * Mako no Theme)" |
| Love Heart | 4. "Graduation~それぞれの明日^{?}~" | 4. "Graduation~それぞれの明日^{?}~" |
| Standard | 1. "Trip Machine" | 1. "Trip Machine" |
| Standard | 2. "Brilliant 2U" | 2. "Brilliant 2U" |
| Standard | 3. "La Senorita" | 3. "La Senorita" |
| Standard | 4. "Paranoia" | 4. "Paranoia" |
| Remix | 1. "Trip Machine (LuvMix)" | 1. "Trip Machine (LuvMix)" |
| Remix | 2. "Brilliant 2U (Orchestra Groove)" | 2. "Brilliant 2U (Orchestra Groove)" |
| Remix | 3. "La Senorita Virtual" | 3. "La Senorita Virtual" |
| Remix | 4. "Paranoia KCET (Clean Mix)" | 4. "Paranoia KCET (Clean Mix)" |
| Fine Choice -Nonstop- | 1. "R3" | 1. "R3" |
| Fine Choice -Nonstop- | 2. "Happy Wedding" | 2. "Happy Wedding" |
| Fine Choice -Nonstop- | 3. "La Copa de la Vida" | 3. "La Copa de la Vida" |
| Fine Choice -Nonstop- | 4. "Destiny Lovers" | 4. "Destiny Lovers" |
| Middle Tempo | 1. "Drop the Bomb" | 1. "Drop the Bomb" |
| Middle Tempo | 2. "Kiss Me All Night Long" | 2. "Kiss Me All Night Long" |
| Middle Tempo | 3. "Frozen Ray (For Extreme)" | 3. "Frozen Ray (For Extreme)" |
| Middle Tempo | 4. "Luv To Me (Disco Mix)" | 4. "Luv To Me (Disco Mix)" |
| Funky Groove | 1. "Scorching Moon" | 1. "Scorching Moon" |
| Funky Groove | 2. "A Stupid Barber" | 2. "A Stupid Barber" |
| Funky Groove | 3. "Dance Dance Revolution" | 3. "Dance Dance Revolution" |
| Funky Groove | 4. "Orion.78 (Civilization Mix)" | 4. "Orion.78 (Civilization Mix)" |
| Brand-New Songs -Nonstop- | 1. "A Stupid Barber" | 1. "A Stupid Barber" |
| Brand-New Songs -Nonstop- | 2. "Un Deux Trois" | 2. "Un Deux Trois" |
| Brand-New Songs -Nonstop- | 3. "Try 2 Luv. U" | 3. "Try 2 Luv. U" |
| Brand-New Songs -Nonstop- | 4. "I Need You" | 4. "I Need You" |
| Max Quartet | 1. "Max 300" | 1. "Max 300" |
| Max Quartet | 2. "Maxx Unlimited" | 2. "Maxx Unlimited" |
| Max Quartet | 3. "The Legend of Max" | 3. "The Legend of Max" |
| Max Quartet | 4. "Max. (Period)" | 4. "Max. (Period)" |
| Order 1 -Nonstop- | Up to four player selected tracks, ranging from Beginner to Challenge in difficulty. | |
| Order 2 -Nonstop- | Up to four player selected tracks, ranging from Beginner to Challenge in difficulty. | |
| Order 3 -Nonstop- | Up to four player selected tracks, ranging from Beginner to Challenge in difficulty. | |

=== Challenge (arcade) ===
The Nonstop Challenge mode from DDRMAX2 Dance Dance Revolution 7thMix returns in Extreme, with its name simplified to Challenge. As before, each player begins with four lives, though the battery only depicts three. Upon breaking a combo (with a Good, Almost or Boo step) or failing to complete a freeze arrow, one life is depleted. Some songs will replenish a life or two after completion. Extreme exchanges the percentage meter with a points meter to determine a player's score. Some Challenge courses contain forced modifiers, listed after the song title in bold. New Challenge courses are in green, yellow and purple, while boss courses are in red.

Extreme features 26 Challenge courses, including eight from DDRMAX2. SuperNova and SuperNova 2 feature five courses from DDRMAX2 (Love RevenG, plus four courses common to Extreme) and five courses from Extreme. In Dance Dance Revolution SuperNova

| Challenge | Songs | Availability | |
| Challenge | Songs | MAX2 | SN/SN2 |
|---|---|---|---|
| Naoki Neo-Standard | 1. "蒼い衝動^{?} Blue Impulse (for Extreme)" | | Yes |
| Naoki Neo-Standard | 2. "Hyper Eurobeat" | | Yes |
| Naoki Neo-Standard | 3. "Brilliant 2U (Orchestra Groove)" | | Yes |
| Naoki Neo-Standard | 4. "Memories" | | Yes |
| Naoki Neo-Standard | 5. "Burnin' the Floor (Momo Mix)" | | Yes |
| Dancemania -Oni- | 1. "Get Up'n Move" | | |
| Dancemania -Oni- | 2. "I Believe in Miracles" | | |
| Dancemania -Oni- | 3. "Captain Jack (Grandale Remix)" | | |
| Dancemania -Oni- | 4. "Synchronized Love (Red Monster Hyper Mix)" | | |
| Dancemania -Oni- | 5. "Rhythm and Police (K.O.G G3 Mix)" | | |
| Dancemania -Oni- | 6. "Butterfly" | | |
| Paranoia Brothers | 1. "Paranoia" | | Yes |
| Paranoia Brothers | 2. "Paranoia Eternal" | | Yes |
| Paranoia Brothers | 3. "Paranoia Survivor" | | Yes |
| Paranoia Brothers | 4. "Paranoia Max (Dirty Mix)" | | Yes |
| Paranoia Brothers | 5. "Paranoia Survivor Max" | | Yes |
| Trip Five | 1. "Trip Machine" | | Yes |
| Trip Five | 2. "SP-Trip Machine (Jungle Mix)" | | Yes |
| Trip Five | 3. "Trip Machine (Luv Mix)" | | Yes |
| Trip Five | 4. "Trip Machine Climax" | | Yes |
| Trip Five | 5. "Trip Machine Survivor" | | Yes |
| Classic | 1. "End of the Century" | | |
| Classic | 2. "Speed Over Beethoven" | | |
| Classic | 3. "Saints Go Marching (Remix)" | | |
| Classic | 4. "V (For Extreme)" | | |
| Classic | 5. "革命^{?}" | | |
| 2MB 道^{?} | 1. "Paranoia KCET (Clean Mix)" | | |
| 2MB 道^{?} | 2. "Trip Machine (LuvMix)" | | |
| 2MB 道^{?} | 3. "La Senorita Virtual" | | |
| 2MB 道^{?} | 4. "Orion.78 (Civilization Mix)" | | |
| 2MB 道^{?} | 5. "Healing Vision (Angelic Mix)" | | |
| World Tour | 1. "Living in America" | | |
| World Tour | 2. "La Bamba" | | |
| World Tour | 3. "La Copa de la Vida" | | |
| World Tour | 4. "Mobo★Moga" | | |
| World Tour | 5. "Afronova" | | |
| World Tour | 6. "JaneJana" | | |
| World Tour | 7. "Gamelan de Couple" | | |
| World Tour | 8. "Orion.78 (AMEuro-Mix)" | | |
| World Tour | 9. "祭^{?} Japan" | | |
| Trick | 1. "祭^{?} Japan (From Nonstop Megamix)" **Boost** | | Yes |
| Trick | 2. "Sexy Planet (From Nonstop Megamix)" **Boost**, **Reverse** | | Yes |
| Trick | 3. "Ecstasy (Midnight Blue Mix)" **Brake**, **Reverse** | | Yes |
| Trick | 4. "AM-3P (AM East Mix)" **Wave** | | Yes |
| Trick | 5. "Max 300" **0.25** | | Yes |
| Club Ver. | 1. "Celebrate" | | |
| Club Ver. | 2. "Jam Jam Reggae" | | |
| Club Ver. | 3. "R3" | | |
| Club Ver. | 4. "Luv To Me (Disco Mix)" | | |
| Club Ver. | 5. "Genom Screams" | | |
| Club Ver. | 6. "Ska a Go Go" | | |
| 🔒 Sorrow | 1. "I feel ･･･" | | Yes |
| 🔒 Sorrow | 2. "Rain of Sorrow" | | Yes |
| 🔒 Sorrow | 3. "L'amour et la Liberté (DDR Ver.)" | | Yes |
| 🔒 Sorrow | 4. "Vanity Angel" | | Yes |
| 🔒 Sorrow | 5. "Tears" | | Yes |
| 🔒 Taq 道^{?} | 1. "Holic" | | |
| 🔒 Taq 道^{?} | 2. "Era (NostalMix)" | | |
| 🔒 Taq 道^{?} | 3. "DXY !" | | |
| 🔒 Taq 道^{?} | 4. "Electro Tuned (The SubS Mix)" | | |
| 🔒 Taq 道^{?} | 5. "Stoic" | | |
| 🔒 Taq 道^{?} | 6. "Sync(Extreme Version)" | | |
| 🔒 From GF&DM | 1. "Jet World" | | |
| 🔒 From GF&DM | 2. "Mikeneko Rock" | | |
| 🔒 From GF&DM | 3. "Destiny Lovers" | | |
| 🔒 From GF&DM | 4. "The Least 100Sec" | | |
| 🔒 From GF&DM | 5. "Across the Nightmare" | | |
| 🔒 Reveng New-Revenge | 1. "Afronova" | | |
| 🔒 Reveng New-Revenge | 2. "祭^{?} Matsuri Japan" | | |
| 🔒 Reveng New-Revenge | 3. "Tsugaru" | | |
| 🔒 Reveng New-Revenge | 4. "Bag" | | |
| 🔒 Reveng New-Revenge | 5. "Sakura" **0.5** | | |
| 🔒 Naoki Premium | 1. "1998" | | |
| 🔒 Naoki Premium | 2. "Hyper Eurobeat" | | |
| 🔒 Naoki Premium | 3. "Burnin' the Floor (Momo Mix)" | | |
| 🔒 Naoki Premium | 4. "Dynamite Rave" | | |
| 🔒 Naoki Premium | 5. "Dance Dance Revolution" | | |
| Naoki Standard | 1. "Brilliant 2U" | Yes | |
| Naoki Standard | 2. "Dynamite Rave" | Yes | |
| Naoki Standard | 3. "Celebrate Nite" | Yes | |
| Naoki Standard | 4. "B4U" | Yes | |
| Naoki Standard | 5. "Burnin' the Floor" | Yes | |
| Naoki Standard | 6. "D2R" | Yes | |
| Paranoia Brothers | 1. "Paranoia" | Yes | Yes |
| Paranoia Brothers | 2. "Paranoia Max (Dirty Mix)" | Yes | Yes |
| Paranoia Brothers | 3. "Paranoia KCET (Clean Mix)" | Yes | Yes |
| Paranoia Brothers | 4. "Paranoia Evolution" | Yes | Yes |
| Paranoia Brothers | 5. "Paranoia Rebirth" | Yes | Yes |
| Naoki feat. Paula Terry | 1. "Still in My Heart (Momo Mix)" | Yes | Yes |
| Naoki feat. Paula Terry | 2. "Can't Stop Fallin' in Love" | Yes | Yes |
| Naoki feat. Paula Terry | 3. "Broken My Heart" | Yes | Yes |
| Naoki feat. Paula Terry | 4. "Love Again Tonight (For Melissa Mix)" | Yes | Yes |
| Naoki feat. Paula Terry | 5. "Destiny" | Yes | Yes |
| Soul 6 | 1. "Share My Love" | Yes | |
| Soul 6 | 2. "Do It Right" | Yes | |
| Soul 6 | 3. "Secret Rendez-vous" | Yes | |
| Soul 6 | 4. "Let's Groove" | Yes | |
| Soul 6 | 5. "Hysteria 2001" | Yes | |
| Soul 6 | 6. "Groove" | Yes | |
| Midnight Blue | 1. "AM-3P (AM East Mix)" | Yes | Yes |
| Midnight Blue | 2. "Ecstasy (Midnight Blue Mix)" | Yes | Yes |
| Midnight Blue | 3. "Sexy Planet (From Nonstop Megamix)" | Yes | Yes |
| Midnight Blue | 4. "Secret Rendez-vous" | Yes | Yes |
| Midnight Blue | 5. "Insertion" | Yes | Yes |
| From IIDX | 1. "Absolute" | Yes | |
| From IIDX | 2. "Holic" | Yes | |
| From IIDX | 3. "Abyss" | Yes | |
| From IIDX | 4. "DXY !" | Yes | |
| From IIDX | 5. "Burning Heat! (3 Option Mix)" | Yes | |
| Naoki Platinum | 1. "Brilliant 2U (K.O.G G3 Mix)" | Yes | Yes |
| Naoki Platinum | 2. "Dynamite Rave (B4 Za Beat Mix)" | Yes | Yes |
| Naoki Platinum | 3. "Celebrate Nite (Euro Trance Style)" | Yes | Yes |
| Naoki Platinum | 4. "B4U (B4 Za Beat Mix)" | Yes | Yes |
| Naoki Platinum | 5. "Burnin' the Floor (Blue Fire Mix)" | Yes | Yes |
| Naoki Platinum | 6. "D2R" | Yes | Yes |
| 鬼道 弐^{?} (Demon Road 2) | 1. "Drop Out (From Nonstop Megamix)" | Yes | |
| 鬼道 弐^{?} (Demon Road 2) | 2. "Sexy Planet (From Nonstop Megamix)" | Yes | |
| 鬼道 弐^{?} (Demon Road 2) | 3. "Breakdown!" | Yes | |
| 鬼道 弐^{?} (Demon Road 2) | 4. "Tsugaru (Apple Mix)" | Yes | |
| 鬼道 弐^{?} (Demon Road 2) | 5. "Burning Heat! (3 Option Mix)" | Yes | |
| 鬼道 弐^{?} (Demon Road 2) | 6. "革命^{?}" **Dark**, **Reverse** | Yes | |
| 🔒 IIDX Boss | 1. "DXY !" | | |
| 🔒 IIDX Boss | 2. "V (For Extreme)" | | |
| 🔒 IIDX Boss | 3. "Colors (For Extreme)" | | |
| 🔒 IIDX Boss | 4. "A" | | |
| 🔒 IIDX Boss | 5. "Xenon" | | |
| 🔒 鬼の遅道^{?} (Demon's Slow Road) | 1. "Make It Better" | | |
| 🔒 鬼の遅道^{?} (Demon's Slow Road) | 2. "We Will Rock You" | | |
| 🔒 鬼の遅道^{?} (Demon's Slow Road) | 3. "Jam Jam Reggae" | | |
| 🔒 鬼の遅道^{?} (Demon's Slow Road) | 4. "Be in My Paradise" | | |
| 🔒 鬼の遅道^{?} (Demon's Slow Road) | 5. "Bag" | | |
| 🔒 真鬼道^{?} (Real Ghost Road) | 1. "Little Bitch" | | |
| 🔒 真鬼道^{?} (Real Ghost Road) | 2. "Gradiusic Cyber (AMD G5 Mix)" | | |
| 🔒 真鬼道^{?} (Real Ghost Road) | 3. "Drop Out" | | |
| 🔒 真鬼道^{?} (Real Ghost Road) | 4. "Leading Cyber" | | |
| 🔒 真鬼道^{?} (Real Ghost Road) | 5. "So Deep (Perfect Sphere Remix)" | | |
| 🔒 真鬼道^{?} (Real Ghost Road) | 6. "Daikenkai" | | |
| 🔒 真鬼道^{?} (Real Ghost Road) | 7. "Cartoon Heroes (Speedy Mix)" | | |
| 🔒 伝説道^{?} (Legendary Road) | 1. "Max 300" | | |
| 🔒 伝説道^{?} (Legendary Road) | 2. "Maxx Unlimited" | | |
| 🔒 伝説道^{?} (Legendary Road) | 3. "Sakura" | | |
| 🔒 伝説道^{?} (Legendary Road) | 4. "The Legend of Max" | | |
| 🔒 伝説道^{?} (Legendary Road) | 5. "Paranoia Survivor Max" | | |

=== PlayStation 2 ===
The following Challenge courses from the arcade version return on the PlayStation 2 version:

- Naoki Neo-Standard
- Paranoia Brothers
- Paranoia Brothers (MAX2)
- Trip Five
- From GF&DM
- Naoki Premium
- 真鬼道 (Real Ghost Road)

Additionally, the 2MB道 (2MB Road) and 伝説道 (Legendary Road) courses add "Max. Period" as the final song in Expert and Challenge difficulty, respectively.

The following Challenge courses for the PlayStation 2 remove songs compared to their arcade counterparts:

- Classic: "End of the Century" and "Saints Go Marching (Remix)" are absent.
- World Tour: "Living in America", "Orion.78 (Ameuro-Mix)" and "Matsuri Japan" are absent.
- IIDX Boss: "DXY!" is absent.

| Challenge | Songs |
|---|---|
| More Light EX | 1. "I Do I Do I Do" |
| More Light EX | 2. "La Copa de la Vida" |
| More Light EX | 3. "Cartoon Heroes (Speedy Mix)" |
| More Light EX | 4. "Irresistiblement" |
| More Light EX | 5. "We Will Rock You" |
| Trick | 1. "Higher" **Boost** |
| Trick | 2. "We Are the Champions (Factory Team Remix)" **Boost**, **Reverse** |
| Trick | 3. "La Senorita" **Brake**, **Reverse** |
| Trick | 4. "TwinBee ~Generation X~" **Wave** |
| Trick | 5. "Max 300" **0.25** |
| Darkness | 1. "Burnin' the Floor (Momo Mix)" **Dark** |
| Darkness | 2. "Un Deux Trois" **Dark** |
| Darkness | 3. "Wild Rush" **Dark** |
| Darkness | 4. "Heaven is a '57 Metallic Gray (Gimmix)" **Dark** |
| Darkness | 5. "Stoic(Extreme Version)" **Dark** |
| Reverse道^{?} | 1. "Make It Better" **Reverse** |
| Reverse道^{?} | 2. "I'm Gonna Get You!" **Reverse** |
| Reverse道^{?} | 3. "Silent Hill" **Reverse** |
| Reverse道^{?} | 4. "Irresistiblement" **Reverse** |
| Reverse道^{?} | 5. "Forever Sunshine" **Reverse** |
| Sorrow | 1. "Memories" |
| Sorrow | 2. "Healing Vision" |
| Sorrow | 3. "L'amour et la Liberté (DDR Ver.)" |
| Sorrow | 4. "Vanity Angel" |
| Sorrow | 5. "Tears" |
| RevenGと^{?}Taq | 1. "Afronova" |
| RevenGと^{?}Taq | 2. "Sync(Extreme Version)" |
| RevenGと^{?}Taq | 3. "Sakura" |
| RevenGと^{?}Taq | 4. "Stoic(Extreme Version)" |
| Rap 5 | 1. "Brilliant 2U" |
| Rap 5 | 2. "Drop the Bomb" |
| Rap 5 | 3. "Think Ya Better D" |
| Rap 5 | 4. "Love This Feelin'" |
| Rap 5 | 5. "Daikenkai" |
| Soul 6 | 1. "Baby Baby Gimme Your Love" |
| Soul 6 | 2. "After the Game of Love" |
| Soul 6 | 3. "Keep on Liftin'" |
| Soul 6 | 4. "Super Star" |
| Soul 6 | 5. "Put Your Faith in Me" |
| Soul 6 | 6. "Keep on Movin'" |
| Happy Hardcore | 1. "321 Stars" |
| Happy Hardcore | 2. "Crash !" |
| Happy Hardcore | 3. "Mahou no Tobira (Space * Mako no Theme)" |
| Happy Hardcore | 4. "Be Lovin" |
| Happy Hardcore | 5. "Can't Stop Fallin' In Love(Speed Mix)" |
| From Solo | 1. "Sexy Planet" **Solo** |
| From Solo | 2. "Super Star" **Solo** |
| From Solo | 3. "Wild Rush" **Solo** |
| From Solo | 4. "Paranoia Evolution" **Solo** |
| Midnight Blue | 1. "Feeling of Love" |
| Midnight Blue | 2. "Hold on Me" |
| Midnight Blue | 3. "Ecstasy" |
| Midnight Blue | 4. "Kiss Me All Night Long" |
| Midnight Blue | 5. "Stay (Organic House Version)" |
| Brand-New Songs -Oni- | 1. "I Need You" |
| Brand-New Songs -Oni- | 2. "Try 2 Luv. U" |
| Brand-New Songs -Oni- | 3. "A Stupid Barber" |
| Brand-New Songs -Oni- | 4. "Forever Sunshine" |
| Brand-New Songs -Oni- | 5. "Scorching Moon" |
| Brand-New Songs -Oni- | 6. "Un Deux Trois" |
| Nori Nori Mix | 1. "Hyper Eurobeat" |
| Nori Nori Mix | 2. "I Do I Do I Do" |
| Nori Nori Mix | 3. "Kiss Kiss Kiss" |
| Nori Nori Mix | 4. "Last Message" |
| Nori Nori Mix | 5. "Luv To Me (Disco Mix)" |
| Angel's | 1. "Miracle Moon ~L.E.D.Light Style Mix~" |
| Angel's | 2. "♥ Love² Syuga→ ♥" |
| Angel's | 3. "Love ♥ Shine" |
| Angel's | 4. "Mobo★Moga" |
| Angel's | 5. "Mahou no Tobira (Space * Mako no Theme)" |
| Angel's | 6. "Pink Rose" |
| Angel's | 7. "Kiss Kiss Kiss" |
| Angel's | 8. "White Lovers" |
| Angel's | 9. "Last Message" |
| Angel's | 10. "Graduation~それぞれの明日^{?}~" |
| From IIDX | 1. "Happy Wedding" |
| From IIDX | 2. "More Deep (Ver.2.1)" |
| From IIDX | 3. "Bad Routine" |
| From IIDX | 4. "Tomorrow Perfume" |
| From IIDX | 5. "Sync(Extreme Version)" |
| 鬼の遅道^{?} | 1. "Make It Better" |
| 鬼の遅道^{?} | 2. "We Will Rock You" |
| 鬼の遅道^{?} | 3. "Baby Baby Gimme Your Love" |
| 鬼の遅道^{?} | 4. "My Summer Love" |
| 鬼の遅道^{?} | 5. "Bag" |
| 鬼の乱^{?} | Six randomly selected tracks, on random difficulty levels and with random modifiers. |
| Ultra 16 | 1. "Healing Vision (Angelic Mix)" |
| Ultra 16 | 2. "Max 300" |
| Ultra 16 | 3. "A" |
| Ultra 16 | 4. "Trip Machine Climax" |
| Ultra 16 | 5. "Paranoia Survivor" |
| Ultra 16 | 6. "Xenon" |
| Ultra 16 | 7. "Maxx Unlimited" |
| Ultra 16 | 8. "My Summer Love" |
| Ultra 16 | 9. "Sakura" |
| Ultra 16 | 10. "Kakumei" |
| Ultra 16 | 11. "Trip Machine Survivor" |
| Ultra 16 | 12. "The Legend of Max" |
| Ultra 16 | 13. "Bag" |
| Ultra 16 | 14. "Paranoia Survivor Max" |
| Ultra 16 | 15. "Cartoon Heroes (Speedy Mix)" |
| Ultra 16 | 16. "Max. (Period)" |
| Order 1 -Oni- | Up to twenty player selected tracks, ranging from Beginner to Challenge in difficulty with random modifiers. |
| Order 2 -Oni- | Up to twenty player selected tracks, ranging from Beginner to Challenge in difficulty with random modifiers. |
| Order 3 -Oni- | Up to twenty player selected tracks, ranging from Beginner to Challenge in difficulty with random modifiers. |

== New songs ==
=== Konami originals ===
Dance Dance Revolution Extreme features 60 new Konami originals, of which 45 are Bemani crossovers. Most of these songs reappear in subsequent arcade releases.

In regular gameplay, the default song is "Graduation" by BeForU, known as "Graduation ~それぞれの明日~" (Note: ~for each tomorrow~ (~それぞれの明日~)) in the game. This song returns in all subsequent arcade releases, with the exception of Dance Dance Revolution X.

"Crash!", "Memories" and "Vanity Angel" were originally featured in Dancing Stage EuroMix 2. While "Crash!" was removed from the arcade series after Dance Dance Revolution SuperNova 2, the two other songs were retained in SuperNova and all subsequent releases. "Memories" is an unlockable song in the 2004 North American release of Extreme for the PlayStation 2. In 2006, the unlock code was released on the Burger King website for a promotional campaign.

The game features four boss songs, which include "Paranoia Survivor" and "Paranoia Survivor Max" on Final Stage, "The Legend of Max" on Extra Stage, and "Dance Dance Revolution" on One More Extra Stage.

Six songs feature a Japanese name, which the international release of Dance Dance Revolution SuperNova and several other games translate to English:

Konami originals with translated names
| English | | Japanese | |
| Song title | Artist | Song title | Artist |
|---|---|---|---|
| Blue Impulse ~for Extreme~ | Naoki featuring Yuki | 蒼い衝動 ～for EXTREME～ | NAOKI feat. YUKI |
| Calico Cat Rock | Anettai Maji-Ska Bakudan | 三毛猫ロック | 亜熱帯マジ-SKA爆弾 |
| Daikenkai | Des-Row・Union | 大見解 | Des-ROW・組 |
| ♥Love² Sugar→♥ | DJ Taka featuring Noria | ♥LOVE² シュガ→♥ | dj TAKA feat.のりあ |
| Magic Door (Theme of Space🪐Maco) | a.s.a. | 魔法の扉(スペース🪐マコのテーマ) | a.s.a. |
| Sakura | Reven-G | 桜 | Reven-G |

=== Licensed songs ===
Dance Dance Revolution Extreme features 9 new licensed songs from Dancemania. Of these, "Senorita (Speedy Mix)" [sic] by Jenny Rom is the only license to be absent in the PlayStation 2 (PS2) version in Japan, although a preview of this song is hidden in game data.

Although none of the licenses are available in Extreme for the PS2 in North America, five songs do appear in Dance Dance Revolution Extreme 2 for the PS2 in that region: "Cartoon Heroes (Speedy Mix)" by Barbie Young, "Irrésistiblement" by Wildside, "La Copa de la Vida" by Patrick Victorio, and "Speed Over Beethoven" by Rose.

On April 25, 2019, "Cartoon Heroes (20th Anniversary Mix)" was added to Dance Dance Revolution A20 and subsequent releases when playing on a golden cabinet. It is an in-house cover by Konami, based on the version found in Extreme.

The game StepManiaX by Step Revolution features three of the Extreme licenses with new charts. "Senorita (Speedy Mix)" and "Speed Over Beethoven" were added in 2020, while "Senorita (Speedy Mix)" [sic] was added in 2021.

== Music samplers ==
=== Dance Dance Revolution Extreme (North America) ===
Dance Dance Revolution EXTREME LIMITED EDITION MUSIC SAMPLER

Soundtrack album by Various Artists
- Released: September 21, 2004
- Genre: Various Genres
- Length: 36:54
- Label: Konami
- Producer: Konami

Various Artists chronology
| Dance Dance Revolution EXTREME LIMITED EDITION MUSIC SAMPLER (2004) | Dance Dance Revolution Ultramix 2 Limited Edition Music Sampler (2004) |

Dance Dance Revolution Extreme Limited Edition Music Sampler was released on September 21, 2004 by Konami Digital Entertainment of America in North America. This sampler was only available for pre-orders, typically at a GameStop or EB Games retail outlet. The CD contains tracks taken directly from the game as well as unique remixes done by Konami's in-house artists, from a broad range of musical styles.

Known to Konami as V-RARE SOUNDTRACK-3 USA, the V-RARE moniker had first been used by Konami to release similar albums in Japan to commemorate Bemani game releases there and still are to this date are. In Japan the music CDs are usually bundled with a given game upon release. To date Konami has released 13 V-RARE discs in the US to promote various Dance Dance Revolution game releases and has released them through various video game and non-video game vendors such as GameStop, EB Games, Toys "R" Us, and Burger King.

| Track | Song | Artist | Genre |
|---|---|---|---|
| 1 | Scorching Moon | Shawn The Horny Master | HOUSE |
| 2 | A | D.J. Amuro | RENAISSANCE |
| 3 | ECSTASY | d-complex | EURO TRANCE |
| 4 | Your Rain (RAGE MIX) | Akira Yamaoka feat. Mary Elizabeth McGlynn | ELECTRO R&B |
| 5 | WILD RUSH | FACTOR-X | AMBIENT BREAKS |
| 6 | A Stupid Barber | Sho-T | EURO HOUSE |
| 7 | MOBO★MOGA | Orange Lounge | FRENCH POP |
| 8 | JET WORLD | Mutsuhiko Izumi | ROCK'N COUNTRY |
| 9 | 321STARS | DJ SIMON | TECHNO POP |
| 10 | V (for EXTREME) | TAKA | PROGRESSIVE |
EXCLUSIVE BONUS TRACKS
| 11 | I Need You (Insideout Door 3Mixes) | Supa Fova | DANCE POP |
| 12 | DROP THE BOMB (Original Extended Tune) | Scotty D. | TECHNO RAVE |
| 13 | B4U (glorious style) | NAOKI | SPEED RAVE |
| 14 | SO IN LOVE -train- | Caramel S. And The Master | SOFT JAZZ |
| 15 | I Need You (True Platinum Mix) | Sho-T | HOUSE |

=== Dance Dance Revolution Extreme 2 (North America) ===
Dance Dance Revolution Extreme 2 Limited Edition Music Sampler

Soundtrack album by Various artists
- Released: September 28, 2005
- Genre: Various genres
- Length: 41:30
- Label: Konami
- Producer: Konami

Various artists chronology
| Dance Dance Revolution Ultramix 2 Limited Edition Music Sampler (2004) | Dance Dance Revolution Extreme 2 Limited Edition Music Sampler (2005) | Dance Dance Revolution Ultramix 3 Limited Edition Music Sampler (2005) |

Dance Dance Revolution Extreme 2 Limited Edition Music Sampler by Konami Digital Entertainment of America in North America. This sampler was only available for pre-orders, typically at a GameStop or EB Games retail outlet. The CD contains tracks taken directly from the game as well as unique remixes done by Konami's in-house artists, from a broad range of musical styles.

The CD is also known as V-RARE Soundtrack-5 USA. The V-RARE moniker was first used by Konami to release similar video game-based albums in Japan. In Japan these promotional CDs are usually bundled with its corresponding game upon release. As of December 2010, Konami has released 14 V-RARE discs in the US to promote various Dance Dance Revolution games. The latest one was released in 2008 along with Dance Dance Revolution SuperNova 2.

| Track | Song | Artist | Genre |
|---|---|---|---|
| 1 | L'amour et la liberte(DDR ver.) | NAOKI underground | TRANCE |
| 2 | I Need You(Insideout Door Mix) | Supa Fova | DANCE POP |
| 3 | BE LOVIN | D-Crew | HAPPY HARDCORE |
| 4 | un deux trois | SDMS | TRANCE |
| 5 | Quickening | dj TAKA | PSYCHEDELIC |
| 6 | INFINITE PRAYER | L.E.D.Light feat.GORO | OCEANIAN TRIBAL TRANCE |
| 7 | You gotta move it (feat. Julie Rugaard) | Yuzo Koshiro | TRANCE |
| 8 | SAKURA | RevenG | SPIRITUAL |
| 9 | Can Be Real | Vision F | DISCO HOUSE |
| 10 | Colors(for EXTREME) | dj TAKA | TRANCE |
EXCLUSIVE BONUS TRACKS
| 11 | Destiny(piano ver.) | NAOKI | BALLAD |
| 12 | Feelings Won't Fade(Extended Trance Mix) | SySF. | EPIC TRANCE |
| 13 | Midnight Blaze(SySF. Mix) | SySF. | HYPER TRANCE |
| 14 | Can Be Real (soul House Extended) | Vision F | HOUSE |
| 15 | SEDUCTION (Vocal Remix) | NC feat. NRG Factory | PROGRESSIVE TRANCE |
