= Nick Garrie =

British singer-songwriter (born 1949)

- Also known as: Nick Hamilton
- Born: Nicholas Miansarow; 22 June 1949 (age 77); Ripon, West Riding of Yorkshire, England
- Occupation: Singer-songwriter
- Website: nickgarrie.co.uk

Nick Garrie (born Nicholas Miansarow, 22 June 1949), also known as Nick Hamilton or Nick Garrie-Hamilton, is a British singer-songwriter.

== Life and career ==
Garrie was born in Ripon in the West Riding of Yorkshire, to a Russian father and Scottish mother whose surname he adopted. After spending most of his teens in a boarding school in France, he attended the University of Warwick in England, and began writing songs as well as poems. Around 1968, while backpacking around Europe, he began performing in bars and restaurants, and recorded an unreleased LP in Brussels.

He resumed his studies at Warwick, and was then contacted by the Paris-based record label DiscAZ, headed by Lucien Morisse, who offered him a recording contract. Garrie recorded an unreleased single, "Queen of Spades", with producer Mickey Baker, and then an album, The Nightmare of J.B. Stanislas. The album was produced by Eddie Vartan, who had previously worked with his sister Sylvie Vartan and her husband Johnny Hallyday. Vartan hired a 56-piece symphony orchestra for the sessions, against the wishes of Garrie who "later bemoaned the detrimental effects of such lush orchestration on his delicate, uncommonly literate songs". The record was briefly released in France, but label boss Lucien Morisse committed suicide soon afterwards, and Garrie's album was not widely distributed. Original copies of the album became expensive, and it was not until 2005, when Rev-ola Records reissued it, that it was available on compact disc. In 2010, Elefant Records re-issued the album as a deluxe edition with newly recorded songs written in the late 1960s, demos of the originals and a short book written by the artist. In 2024, 9x9 Records re-released The Nightmare of J.B. Stanislas on vinyl, with the single Around the World, written in 1968 and recorded in 2023.

Garrie then withdrew from performing and recording, returning in 1976 under the alias of Nick Hamilton – a family name – to record the single "Un Instant de Vie" with Francis Lai, a friend and admirer of his earlier album. He then managed a ski resort in the Swiss Alps for several years, but in 1983 returned with the single "Back in 1930", produced in France by Paul Samwell-Smith, followed by an album, Suitcase Man, on the Spanish Picap label. The album was arranged and co-produced by guitarist Alun Davies, best known for his work with Cat Stevens, and other musicians included drummer Gerry Conway. It was successful in Spain, and Garrie supported Leonard Cohen on his concerts there.

Garrie started to become better known in the English-speaking world after a track, "Wheel of Fortune", appeared on a psychedelic pop compilation album, Circus Days. In 1988, again under the name Nick Hamilton, he recorded another album, The Playing Fields, with producer Peter-John Vettese, previously of Jethro Tull. In the 1990s, he toured Japan and Korea, and wrote songs, with Francis Lai. He returned to France to work as a teacher, and in 2002 released the album Twelve Old Songs. In late 2005 the British reissue label Rev-Ola released The Nightmare of J.B. Stanislas to much critical acclaim, adding the "Queen of Spades" single as well as several unreleased Belgian demos.

Over the next few years, Garrie became more active as a performer, making his first ever U.S. appearance and playing throughout Europe. In 2009, Elefant Records put out a collection of Garrie's new songs entitled 49 Arlington Gardens, recorded with Scottish musicians in Glasgow, including Duglas T. Stewart (BMX Bandits), Norman Blake (Teenage Fanclub), Francis Macdonald (Teenage Fanclub) and Ally Kerr (singer-songwriter). In June 2012, for the first time in over 40 years, Garrie performed The Nightmare Of J.B. Stanislas in its entirety – with a string section and members of Trembling Bells – at the Primavera Sound festival in Barcelona to a rapturous reception and critical acclaim.

In recent years Garrie has played Shepherd's Bush Empire (with Camera Obscura), Celtic Connections (Glasgow), Tanned Tin (Barcelona), Tonic (New York), L'International (Paris), Lemonpop, Easypop and Felipop (Spain), Jacco Gardner (Netherlands) and Altafidelidad (Madrid and Barcelona). In 2017, Tapete Records released Garrie's most recent work, The Moon and the Village. It was produced by two members of The Ladybug Transistor.

In October 2025, Nick Garrie performed at Cinema Maldà, in Barcelona as part of the Mini-Festival of independent music of Barcelona. A preview of a documentary film, "Lost & Found" still in production as of October 2025, was also shown. The film is directed by Alastair Clark, a comedian and record lover, from Liverpool. Updates on the documentary can be found on the film's instagram and facebook accounts.

== Discography ==
=== Nick Garrie ===
- The Nightmare Of J.B. Stanislas (1969)
- 49 Arlington Gardens (2009)
- The Moon and the Village (2017)
- Around The World (2024)

=== Nick Hamilton ===
- Suitcase Man (1984)
- The Playing Fields (1988)
- Twelve Old Songs (2002)
