= Tous mes copains =

Single by Sylvie Vartan

from the album Sylvie
- Language: French
- English title: All My Friends
- Released: November 1962
- Genre: Pop
- Length: 2:30
- Label: RCA Victor
- Songwriter(s): Jean-Jacques Debout

Sylvie Vartan singles chronology
"Le Loco-motion" (1962)	"Tous mes copains" (1962)	"Chance" / "Il revient" / "Reponds-moi" / "Tous les gens" (1963)

Music video
- "Tous mes copains" (French TV, 1975) on YouTube

"Tous mes copains" (All My Friends) is a song by Sylvie Vartan from her 1962 album Sylvie. It was also released on an EP and as a single that year.

== Background and writing ==
The song was written by Jean-Jacques Debout.

== Commercial performance ==
The song entered the top 10 in France (according to the charts published by the U.S. magazine Billboard in its "Hits of the World" section) and reached no. 12 in Wallonia (French Belgium).

== Track listings ==
7-inch single "M'amuser / Tous mes copains" RCA Victor 45.259 (1962)

A. "M'amuser"
B. "Tous mes copains"

7-inch EP "Moi je pense encore à toi / Dansons / M'amuser / Tous mes copains" RCA Victor 76.602 S, 86602 (1963, France etc.)

A1. "Moi je pense encore à toi" ("Breaking Up Is Hard to Do") (2:05)
A2. "Dansons" ("Let's Dance") (1:55)
B1. "M'amuser" (2:33)
B2. "Tous mes copains" (2:30)

7-inch single RCA Victor 45N-1338 (1963, Italy)

A. "Tous mes copains" (2:30)
B. "Quand le film est triste" (3:05)

== Charts ==
Chart (1962)	Peak position
Belgium (Ultratop 50 Wallonia)	12
France	6
