= Sylvie (album) =

Studio album by Sylvie Vartan
- Released: December 1962
- Recorded: 1961–1962
- Genre: Pop
- Length: 32:01
- Label: RCA Victor

Sylvie Vartan chronology
Sylvie (1962)	Twiste et chante (1963)

Singles from Sylvie
- 1. "Quand le film est triste / Je suis libre / Tout au long du calendrier / Le petit lascar" Released: November 1961 (EP); 2. "Baby c'est vous / Gong-gong / Cri de ma vie / L'amour c'est aimer la vie" Released: July 1962 (EP); 3. "Le Loco-motion / Aussi loin que j'irai / Oui c'est lui / Comme l'été dernier" Released: October 1962 (EP); 4. "Moi je pense encore à toi / Dansons / M'amuser / Tous mes copains" Released: November 1962 (EP)

Professional ratings
Review scores
Source	Rating
AllMusic	3/5 stars
Forces Parallèles	3/5 stars

Sylvie is the debut studio album by French singer Sylvie Vartan. It was released on an LP in December 1962. The orchestration was by Eddie Vartan et Son Orchestre with Mickey Baker and His Orchestra backing on "Le Loco-motion" and "Comme l'été dernier".

== Track listing ==
Side 1
No.	Title	Writer(s)	Length
1.	"Moi je pense encore à toi" ("Breaking Up Is Hard to Do")	Howard Greenfield, Neil Sedaka, André Salvet, Georges Aber	2:10
2.	"Quand le film est triste" ("Sad Movies (Make Me Cry)")	John D. Loudermilk, Georges Aber, Lucien Morisse	3:02
3.	"L'amour c'est aimer la vie" ("Love Is a Swingin' Thing")	Luther Dixon, Pierre Saka, Shirley Owens, Willie Denson	2:00
4.	"Baby c'est vous" ("Baby It's You")	Burt Bacharach, Mack David, Barney Williams, Guy Bertret, Roger Desbois	2:41
5.	"Les vacances se suivent"	Eddie Vartan, Ralph Bernet	2:35
6.	"Dansons" ("Let's Dance")	André Salvet, Jim Lee
7.	"Le Loco-motion" ("The Loco-Motion")	Gerry Goffin, Carole King, Georges Aber	2:02

Side 2
No.	Title	Writer(s)	Length
1.	"M'amuser"	Eddie Francis, Eddie Vartan, Ralph Bernet	2:23
2.	"Tous mes copains"	Jean-Jacques Debout	2:30
3.	"Gong-gong" ("I'm Blue")	Ike Turner, Danyel Gérard	2:23
4.	"Comme l'été dernier" ("Dancin' Party")	Clarence Mann, Dave Appell, Gisèle Vesta	2:00
5.	"Ne le déçois pas" ("Putty in Your Hands")	Kenny Rogers, John Patton, Manou Roblin	2:30
6.	"Cri de ma vie" ("Dream Baby")	Cindy Walker, Georges Aber	2:29
7.	"Est-ce que tu le sais" ("What'd I Say")	Ray Charles, Daniel Hortis, Pierre Saka	3:00
