= Iskrets =

Iskrets Искрец
- Village
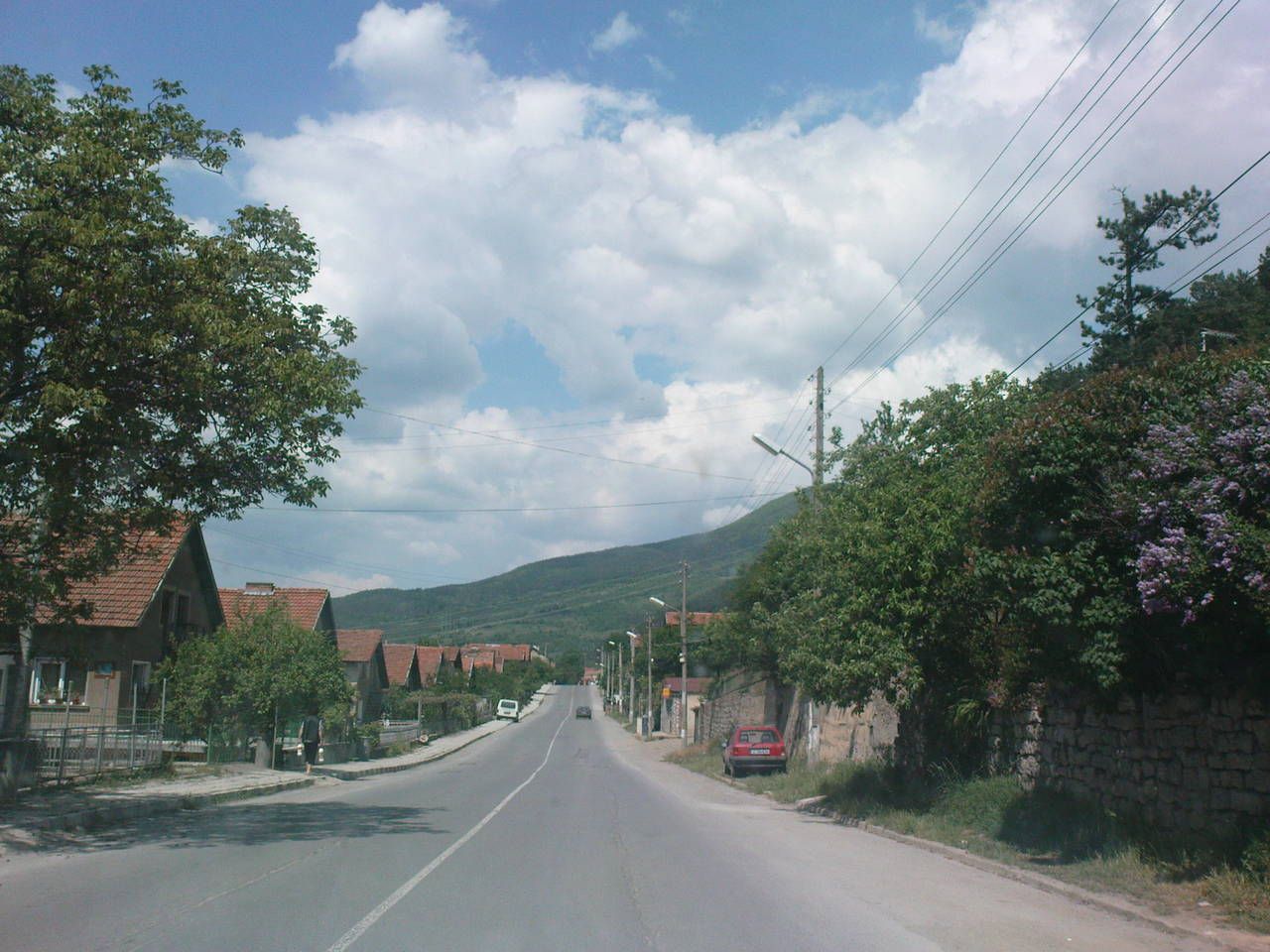

- Location within Bulgaria
- Coordinates: 42.9833°N 23.2500°E
- Country: Bulgaria
- Province: Sofia Province
- Municipality: Svoge
- Time zone: UTC+2 (EET)
  - Summer (DST): UTC+3 (EEST)

Iskrets is a village in Svoge Municipality, Sofia Province, western Bulgaria.

It is located 10 km west of Svoge town. It is situated around the shores of Iskretska River (a tributary of the Iskar, itself a right tributary of the Danube), surrounded by Mala Planina and Ponor Planina.

The village can be reached by car either through E-79 going from Sofia to Lom or through Road 164 from Svoge to Buchin Prohod. There is also public transport departing from Sofia Sever station or from Svoge and passing through Iskrets.

A Pulmonary Disease Recreation Center called "Belodroben Sanatorium" used to exist in the village due to the healing properties of the air in the region. It has been built back in 1908. Now it functions as a standard Active Treatment Hospital. Iskrets is the birthplace of French singer Sylvie Vartan.
