= Comme un garçon =

- Cover art for 7-inch French vinyl release

Single by Sylvie Vartan

from the album Comme un garçon
- Language: French
- English title: Just like a Boy
- Released: January 1968
- Label: RCA Victor
- Songwriters: Jean-Jacques Debout, Roger Dumas

Sylvie Vartan singles chronology
"2'35 de bonheur" (1967)	"Comme un garçon" (1968)	"Irrésistiblement" (1968)

"Comme un garçon" (transl. "Just like a Boy") is a song by Sylvie Vartan from her 1967 album Comme un garçon. It was also released on an EP and as a single.

== Composition ==
The song was written in 1967 when the Sexual Revolution in France was at its height: women wore mini-skirts and trousers and the Neuwirth Law was adopted, authorizing contraception. Also, as Gérard Tilles and Françoise Gründ Khaznadar note in their book Hair: Sign and Signification, the lyrics of the song ("Just like a boy, I wear my hair long") refer to the "long hair revolution" of the 1960s: boys started to look like girls, "who, in their turn, [didn't] miss the opportunity to pass for boys by adopting the same haircuts".

In this song Vartan, an attractive yé-yé star, shows her tomboy side as a "gang leader" who wears trousers and a belt with a large buckle, and rides a Harley-Davidson motorcycle (like Brigitte Bardot): "Just like a boy, I wear a jacket, a medallion, a big buckle [belt]", "Just like a boy, I am stubborn. And remember I often dole out punishments, you gotta be careful".

However Vartan, whom Fabien Lecœuvre notes had matured into a provocative young woman with a sensual voice in the two years she had been married to Johnny Hallyday, had not become a "frenzied feminist". In the chorus the boyish singer becomes, in her lover's arms, like a little girl: "Still I'm only a girl, and when I'm in your arms, I'm only a little girl, so lost when you're not there anymore" and "You do what you want with me, it's much better like this".

Jean-Emmanuel Deluxe noted in his 2013 book Yé-Yé Girls of '60s French Pop that "feminists must have been horrified to discover" what this song and Vartan's songs in general were about.

According to Jérôme Pintoux (in his book Camion blanc: Les chanteurs français des années 60), the verses of the song "celebrate androgyny, but without ambiguity", while the chorus "sings femininity".

Lecœuvre notes that the song also reflects Vartan's childhood frustration of being a little sister: her older brother Eddie always had to keep an eye on her and accompanied her everywhere.

== Writing ==
The song was written by Jean-Jacques Debout (who also wrote the songs "Baby Capone" and "On a toutes besoin d'un homme" for Vartan).

He came up with the idea for the song in a taxi ride to Paris. A woman riding a motorcycle overtook the taxi and the driver exclaimed, "Les filles aujourd'hui sont commes des garçons!" (transl. "Girls nowadays are like boys!"). For the next 3 kilometres (1.9 mi), Debout watched in fascination as the motorcycle dutifully stopped at every red light. When he arrived home, he phoned Eddie Vartan, Sylvie's older brother and producer, and told him about the idea for a new song (at that time he had only the title). Eddie liked the idea, as did Sylvie. Deboux and Roger Dumas wrote the song in one night.

== Commercial performance ==
The song became Vartan's biggest hit since "La plus belle pour aller danser" (1964). It reached at least the top 5 in France (according to the charts published by Billboard in its "Hits of the World" section) and No. 8 in Wallonia (French Belgium). In France the record was certified double gold.

== Different language versions and later recordings ==
Vartan recorded the song in four languages, including Italian ("Come un ragazzo") and (transl. "Just like a Boy").

The song has been recorded, among others, by Hansi Hinterseer (in German under the title "Ich lieb dich immer und immer mehr"), Stereo Total, Dorthe (in German under the title "Man nennt mich Jo"), Birgit Lystager (in Danish under the title "Han er en mand"), Samantha (in Dutch under the title "Net als een jongen"), Gérard Depardieu, Le Grand Orchestre de Paul Mauriat, and Chantal Renaud.

== Track listings ==
7-inch EP "Comme un garçon / Le Jour qui vient / Le Testament / L'enfant aux papillons" RCA 87046 M (1967 or 1968, France)

A1. "Comme un garçon" (3:16)
A2. "Le Jour qui vient" (2:54)
B1. "Le Testament" (2:48)
B2. "L'Enfant aux papillons" (2:25)

7-inch single "Comme un garçon / Le Kid" RCA Victor

A. "Comme un garçon" (3:10)
B. "Le Kid" (2:20)

7-inch EP RCA TP-403 (1968, Portugal)

A1. "Comme un garçon" (3:10)
A2. "Elle est partie" (2:12)
B1. "L'Oiseau" (3:20)
B2. "Le Kid" (2:20)

7-inch single (Canada)

A. "Comme un garçon"
B. "Le Testament"

== Charts ==
Chart (1968)	Peak position
Belgium (Ultratop 50 Wallonia)	8
