= La Maritza =

Single by Sylvie Vartan

from the album Sylvie Vartan (La Maritza)
- Language: French
- B-side: "Un p'tit peu beaucoup"
- Released: November 1968
- Recorded: 1968
- Genre: Pop, chanson
- Length: 3:42
- Label: RCA Victor
- Songwriters: Jean Renard, Pierre Delanoë

Sylvie Vartan singles chronology
"Irrésistiblement" (1968)	"La Maritza" (1968)	"On a toutes besoin d'un homme" (1968)

Music video
- "La Maritza" (French TV, 1972) on YouTube

"La Maritza" is a song by Sylvie Vartan from her 1968 album Sylvie Vartan (also known as La Maritza). It was also released as the second single from that album, and as an EP.

== Background and writing ==
The song was written by Jean Renard and Pierre Delanoë.

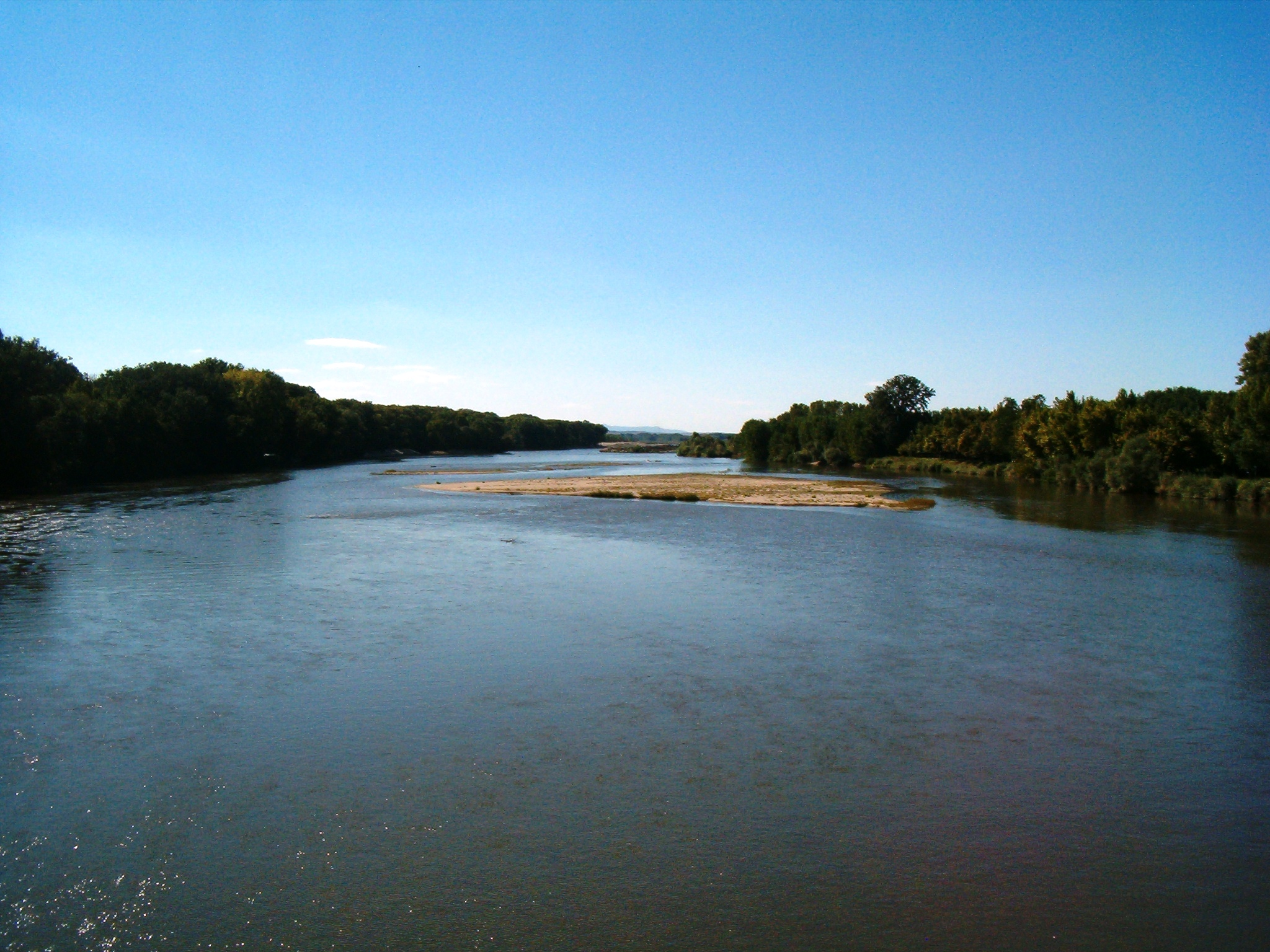
The Maritsa River

Vartan, who was born in Bulgaria, sings her nostalgia for her homeland, especially the Maritsa River.. The melody is written in D minor with a vocalise in its chorus.

== Commercial performance ==
In France the song was released on an EP (La Maritza / Un p'tit peu beaucoup / Jolie poupée).

In Wallonia (French Belgium) the EP charted as a double A-side "La Maritza / Un p'tit peu beaucoup". It spent 19 weeks in the singles chart, peaking at no. 4.

The song "La Maritza" also reached at least in the top 4 in Finland in 1970 (according to the chart, courtesy of INTRO, published by U.S. Billboard magazine in its "Hits of the World" section).

== Track listings ==
7-inch EP "La Maritza / Un p'tit peu beaucoup / Jolie poupée" (RCA Victor 87.074 M in France, RCA Victor TP-455 in Portugal)

A. "La Maritza" (3:42)
B1. "Un p'tit peu beaucoup" (2:30)
B2. "Jolie poupée"

7-inch single "La Maritza / Un p'tit peu beaucoup" RCA Victor 3 10372 (Spain)

A. "La Maritza" (3:42)
B. "Un p'tit peu beaucoup" (2:30)

== Charts ==
"La Maritza" / "Un p'tit peu beaucoup"

Chart (1968–1969)	Peak position
Belgium (Ultratop 50 Wallonia)	4
Brazil	10
Finland	4
France (SNEP)	3
Turkey (TML)	3

== Notable cover versions ==
Vartan herself recorded the song also in Italian (under the title "La Maritza") and in German (under the title "Lied ohne Wiederkehr", meaning "Song of No Return"). Seija Simola's version reached at least the top 6 in Finland in 1970 (according to the chart, courtesy of INTRO, published in the "Hits of the World" section of the 21 January 1978 issue of U.S. Billboard).

In 2012 it was covered by the symphonic metal band Therion on their album Les Fleurs du Mal.
