= Par amour, par pitié =

1966 single by Sylvie Vartan

Single by Sylvie Vartan

from the album 2'35 de bonheur
- Language: French
- English title: For love, for pity
- B-side: "Noël sans toi"
- Released: December 1966
- Recorded: 1966
- Genre: Pop
- Length: 3:06
- Label: RCA Victor
- Composer(s): Jean Renard
- Lyricist(s): Gilles Thibaut

Sylvie Vartan singles chronology
"Ballade pour un sourire" (1966)	"Par amour, par pitié" (1966)	"2'35 de bonheur" (1967)

EP

Music video
- "Par amour, par pitié" (official live, 1967) on YouTube

"Par amour, par pitié" ("For love, for pity") is a song by Sylvie Vartan. It was released on an EP in December 1966 and then as the lead single off of her 1967 studio album 2'35 de bonheur ("2'35 of happiness").

== Composition ==
The song was written by Gilles Thibaut and composed by Jean Renard. Originally, the song was written for fellow singer and Vartan's then-husband Johnny Hallyday, but Vartan having had “the privilege” of listening to it first, agreed with the authors that it was more suited to him and appropriated the title.

== Commercial performance ==
The song reached the top 10 in France (according to the charts published by the U.S. magazine Billboard in its "Hits of the World" section) and number two in Wallonia (French Belgium).

== Track listing ==
7-inch EP RCA 86187 M (1966, France etc.)

A1. "Par amour, par pitié" (3:06)
A2. "Noël sans toi" (2:53)
B1. "Quand un amour renaît" (2:31)
B2. 'Garde-moi dans ta poche" (2:27)

== Charts ==
Chart (1967)	Peak position
France (SNEP)	8
Belgium (Ultratop 50 Wallonia)	2
