= Sylvie Vartan (Ta sorcière bien-aimée) =

Studio album by Sylvie Vartan
- Released: December 1976
- Recorded: Mid–late 1976
- Genre: Pop
- Length: 37:28
- Label: RCA Victor
- Producer: Jacques Revaux

Sylvie Vartan chronology
Qu'est-ce qui fait pleurer les blondes ? (1976)	Sylvie Vartan (Ta sorcière bien-aimée) (1976)	Sylvie Vartan (Georges) (1977)

Singles from Sylvie Vartan (Ta sorcière bien-aimée)
- 1. "L'amour c'est comme les bateaux" Released: June 1976; 2. "Ta sorcière bien aimée" Released: November 1976; 3. "Le temps du swing" Released: February 1977; 4. "Masculin singulier" Released: June 1977

Professional ratings
Review scores
Source	Rating
AllMusic	1.5/5 stars

Sylvie Vartan (commonly called Ta sorcière bien-aimée after the first track on side one) is the sixteenth studio album by French singer Sylvie Vartan. It was released on an LP in late 1976. It was arranged by Benoît Kaufman, Hervé Roy and Raymond Donnez.

== Track listing ==
No.	Title	Writer(s)	Length
1.	"Ta sorcière bien-aimée"	Gilbert Di Nino, Michel Gouty, Michel Mallory, Pierre Billon	3:09
2.	"L'amour c'est comme les bateaux"	André Popp, Gilles Thibaut	4:10
3.	"Dieu merci (Si sisto)"	Andrea Lo Vecchio, Clément Chammah, Gilles Thibaut	2:54
4.	"Je croyais"	Cyril Assous, Gilles Thibaut	3:37
5.	"Masculin singulier"	Jacques Revaux, Michel Mallory	3:52

No.	Title	Writer(s)	Length
1.	"Le bonheur"	Gérard Layani, Pierre Delanoë	4:03
2.	"Le temps du swing" ("House of Swing")	Gilles Thibaut, Lou Stonebridge, Tom McGuinness	2:36
3.	"Il suffirait que tu sois là" ("Doccia fredda")	Piero Cassano, Salvatore Stellita	3:45
4.	"La meilleure fille en moi"	Jean-Claude Declercq, Joël Cartigny	2:55
5.	"Souvenirs"	Michel Mallory	3:32
6.	"Je m'en vais"	Michel Mallory	2:50
