= Eddie Vartan =

French musician (1937–2001)

Background information
- Born: Edmond Vartanian; 10 August 1937; Sofia, Kingdom of Bulgaria
- Died: 19 June 2001 (aged 63) Loconville, France
- Genres: French pop music, jazz
- Occupations: Musician, arranger, songwriter, record producer
- Instrument: Trumpet

Edmond Vartan (né Vartanian; 10 August 1937 – 19 June 2001) was a French musician, bandleader, arranger, and record producer of Armenian descent.

== Life and career ==
Vartan was born to Armenian parents in Sofia, Bulgaria, and moved to France with his parents and younger sister Sylvie in 1952. He worked as a trumpet player in Paris jazz clubs, including the Blue Note, and in 1961 gave up his law studies to work as a full-time musician and A&R man for Decca Records.

He worked with jazz enthusiast Daniel Filipacchi on the radio programme Pour ceux qui aiment le jazz ("For those who love jazz"). They also wrote songs together, including "Le transistor", a 1961 hit in France for Frankie Jordan, and then worked on the popular radio show Salut les copains. After Jordan recorded "Panne d'essence" (a version of Floyd Robinson's "Out of Gas") as a duet with Sylvie Vartan, her brother Eddie continued to work with both artists in the early 1960s. He also released records under his own name as a bandleader, and worked with many French singers, notably as the musical director and producer of Johnny Hallyday, who became Sylvie's husband. Among the musicians regularly used by Vartan was English guitarist Mick Jones, later of Spooky Tooth and Foreigner. Eddie Vartan became a leading producer in the French yé-yé pop scene of the 1960s, and also produced Nick Garrie's cult 1969 LP, The Nightmare of J. B. Stanislas. As a songwriter, Vartan's successes included "Jésus-Christ", a 1970 hit for Johnny Hallyday.

Vartan also worked on film soundtracks, notably working on the 1968 film À tout casser and also with directors Georges Lautner, Michel Deville, and Michel Audiard. He published a memoir, Il a neigé sur le mont Vitocha ("It snowed on Mount Vitosha") in 1994.

He died in 2001, aged 63, from a cerebral hemorrhage, and was buried in his home village of Loconville. His son is the actor Michael Vartan.
