= Loconville =

- Commune
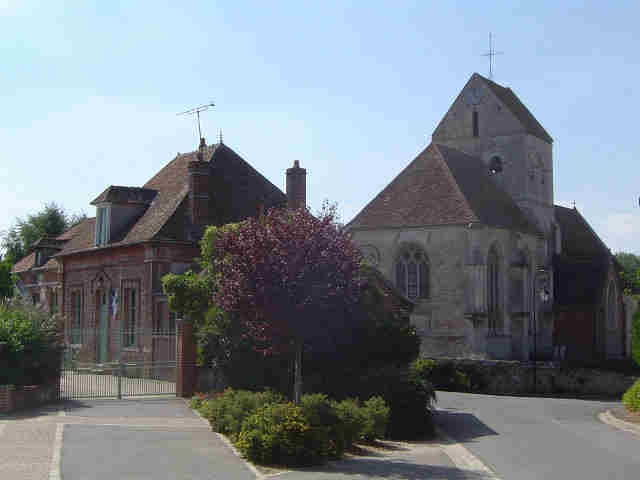
- Town hall and church of St. Lucien
- Location of Loconville
- Location within France Location within Hauts-de-France
- Coordinates: 49°15′22″N 1°55′10″E
- Country: France
- Region: Hauts-de-France
- Department: Oise
- Arrondissement: Beauvais
- Canton: Chaumont-en-Vexin
- Intercommunality: Vexin Thelle

Government
  - Mayor (2020–2026): Serge Steinmayer
- Area^{1}: 5.53 km^{2} (2.14 sq mi)
- Elevation: 76 m (249 ft)
- Highest elevation: 106 m (348 ft)
- Lowest elevation: 63 m (207 ft)
- Population (2023): 329
  - Density: 59.5/km^{2} (154/sq mi)
- Time zone: UTC+01:00 (CET)
  - Summer (DST): UTC+02:00 (CEST)
- INSEE/Postal code: 60367 /60240
- ^{1} French Land Register data, which excludes lakes, ponds, glaciers > 1 km^{2} (0.386 sq mi or 247 acres) and river estuaries.

Loconville (French pronunciation: [lɔkɔ̃vil]) is a commune in the Oise department in northern France.

== See also ==
- Communes of the Oise department
