= Irrésistiblement =

Single by Sylvie Vartan

from the album La Maritza
- Language: French
- English title: "Irresistibly"
- B-side: "Je Suis Comme Ça"
- Released: July 1968
- Recorded: 1968
- Genre: Pop
- Length: 2:50
- Label: RCA Victor
- Songwriter(s): Jean Renard, Georges Aber
- Producer(s): Jean Renard

Sylvie Vartan singles chronology
| "Comme un garçon" (1968) | "Irrésistiblement" (1968) | "La Maritza" (1968) |

Music video
- "Irrésistiblement" on YouTube

"Irrésistiblement" ("Irresistibly") is a song by French pop singer Sylvie Vartan, released in July 1968. Co-written by Jean Renard (who also produced the song) and Georges Aber, the song was released as the lead single off of Vartan's 1968 studio album La Maritza. The song was also adapted into multiple other languages, most notably in Italian as "Irresistibilmente".

== Writing and composition ==
The song was written by Jean Renard and Georges Aber. The melody imagined by Renard includes from the first notes a variation requiring the singer to use a vocal effect called head voice, passing in a few notes to a high register. Vartan is seduced by this difficulty and decides to take up the challenge It is a commercial success which reinforces the image of an irresistible Vartan, facing competition in the 1960s such as Françoise Hardy.

== Commercial performance ==
=== France ===
The song was at no. 13 in the very first edition of the singles sales chart launched by the Centre d'Information et de Documentation du Disque in October 1968.

=== Italy ===
Sylvie Vartan also recorded a version of this song in Italian, titled "Irresistibilmente". It reached the top 3 in Italy in 1969. The song was a gift that Vartan gave to her couple, the Italian composer Franco Battiato.

== Track listings ==
7-inch EP Baby Capone / Pas en été / Irrésistiblement / Je suis comme ça RCA 87071 (1968, France etc.)

A1. "Baby Capone" (3:23)
A2. "Pas en été" (2:47)
B1. "Irrésistiblement" (2:43)
B2. "Je suis comme ça" (2:43)

7-inch promo single RCA Victor 46.170 (1968, France)

1. "Irrésistiblement" (2:50)
2. "Je suis comme ça" (2:50)

7-inch single (Germany, Greece, Spain)

1. "Irrésistiblement" (2:50)
2. "Baby Capone' (3:30)

7-inch EP Baby Capone / Irrésistiblement / C'est un jour à rester couché / Ballade pour une fugue RCA 87071 (1969, Brazil)

A1. "C'est un jour à rester couché"
A2. "Baby Capone"
B1. "Irrésistiblement"
B2. "Ballade pour une fugue"

== Charts ==
=== "Baby Capone" / "Irrésistiblement" ===
| Chart (1968–1969) | Peak position |
|---|---|
| Belgium (Ultratop 50 Wallonia) | 4 |
| France (SNEP) | 2 |
| Italy | 2 |
| Japan | 18 |
