= Sylvie Vartan =

Bulgarian-born French singer and actress (born 1944)

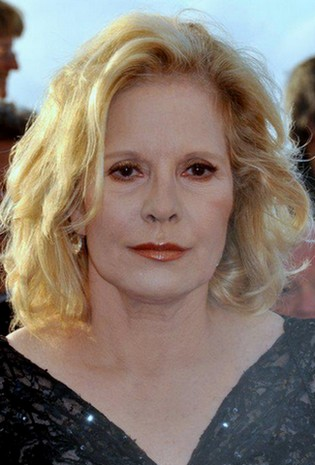
- Vartan at the 2011 Cabourg Film Festival
- Born: 15 August 1944 (age 82); Iskrets, Kingdom of Bulgaria
- Spouses: Johnny Hallyday (m. 1965; div. 1980); Tony Scotti (m. 1984)
- Children: 2, including David Hallyday
- Relatives: Eddie Vartan (brother); Michael Vartan (nephew)
- Musical career
- Origin: Paris, France
- Genres: Yé-yé; rock and roll; pop; disco; soul; jazz
- Occupations: Singer; actress
- Years active: 1952–present
- Labels: Decca; RCA; Universal

Sylvie Vartan (French: [silvi vaʁtɑ̃]; born 15 August 1944) is a Bulgarian-born French singer and actress. She is known as one of the most productive and tough-sounding yé-yé artists. Her performances often featured elaborate show-dance choreography, and she made many appearances on French and Italian TV.

Yearly shows with then-husband Johnny Hallyday attracted full houses at the Olympia and the Palais des congrès de Paris throughout the 1960s and mid-1970s. In 2004, after a break in performances, she began recording and giving concerts of jazz ballads in Francophonie countries.

== Early life ==
Sylvie Vartan was born in Iskrets, Sofia Province, in the then Kingdom of Bulgaria. Her father, Georges Vartan (1912–1970), was born in France to a Bulgarian mother named Slavka and had Armenian roots. He worked as an attaché at the French embassy in Sofia. Her mother, Ilona (1914–2007), was Bulgarian of Hungarian descent.

When the Soviet Army occupied Bulgaria in September 1944, the Vartan family house was nationalised and they moved to Sofia. In 1952, a friend of Sylvie's father, film director Dako Dakovski, offered her the role of a schoolgirl in the movie Pod igoto, a film about Bulgarian rebels against the Ottoman occupation. Participating in the film made her dream of becoming an entertainer come true.

The hardships of postwar Bulgaria made the family emigrate to Paris in December 1952. At first they stayed in the Lion d'Argent hotel near Les Halles, where Georges found a job, then for the next four years they stayed in a single room at the Angleterre Hotel. Young Sylvie had to work hard to keep up at school and blend in with her schoolmates. She spent two years learning French.

In 1960, her family moved to an apartment in Michel Bizot Avenue. Thanks to the influence of her music producer brother Eddie, music became teenage Sylvie's main interest. Her most influential genres were jazz and, out of spite toward her strict high school, rock 'n' roll. Her favourite artists included Brenda Lee, Bill Haley, and Elvis Presley.

== Career ==
=== Twisting schoolgirl ===
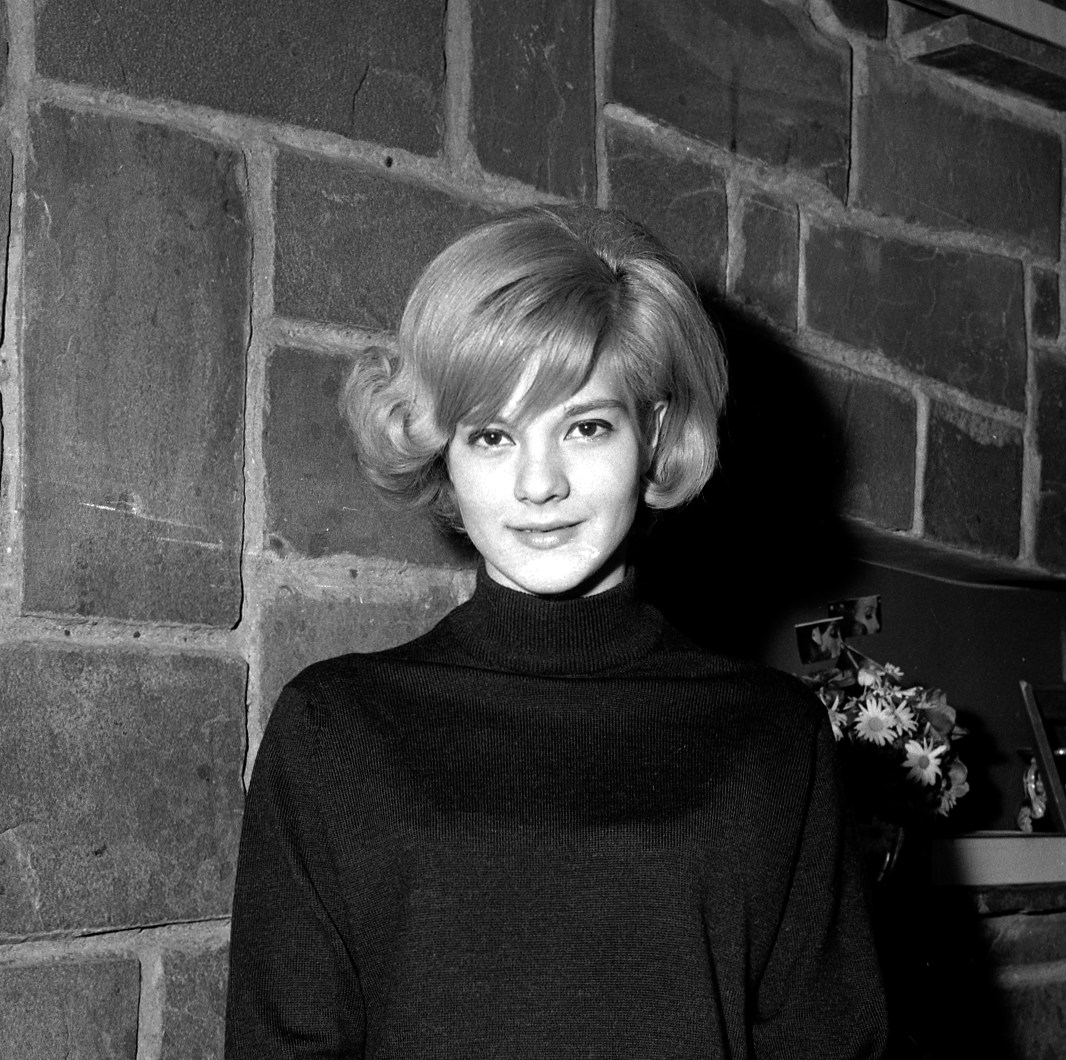
Vartan in 1962

In 1961, Eddie offered Sylvie the chance to record the song "Panne d'essence" with French rocker Frankie Jordan. The Decca Records EP was a surprise hit. Although she was not credited on the sleeve, "Panne d'essence" provided Vartan her first appearance on French television. The journalists gave her the nickname la collégienne du twist. After the "twisting schoolgirl" had finished the Victor Hugo High School, she was free to sign a contract with Decca Records to start recording her own EP; carrying the title song "Quand le film est triste", a cover of Sue Thompson's "Sad Movies (Make Me Cry)", the EP was on sale by the beginning of December 1961.

It was another hit, that served her first concert in Paris Olympia Hall on 12 December 1961. "Est-ce que tu le sais?", her version of Ray Charles' "What'd I Say", was quickly released. She opened for Vince Taylor at Paris Olympia for her second concert. In July she toured France with Gilbert Bécaud. In autumn 1962 she released her version of "The Loco-Motion" on EP and her first LP, Sylvie. Her next hit was "Tous mes copains", issued on EP in 1962. She also had her first adult part in a movie with the small part of a singer in the film Un clair de lune à Maubeuge. In 1963, Paul Anka offered her the song "I'm Watching You", which became her first international hit in Japan and Korea. She rounded out the year with four TV specials and becoming the darling of the teen magazine Salut les Copains. Six of her 31 songs released in 1962/1963 became Top-20 European hits.

In late winter 1963, Vartan toured France with Johnny Hallyday and starred with him in the movie D'où viens-tu, Johnny?. Later, after announcing their engagement over the radio, the young couple performed to a noisy audience of 200,000 at Paris' Place de la Nation. At the year's end they traveled to Nashville, Tennessee to record an album with The Jordanaires. With the special treatment of vocalists, strings, and brass sections in the true Nashville style, these recordings were a great commercial success in France.

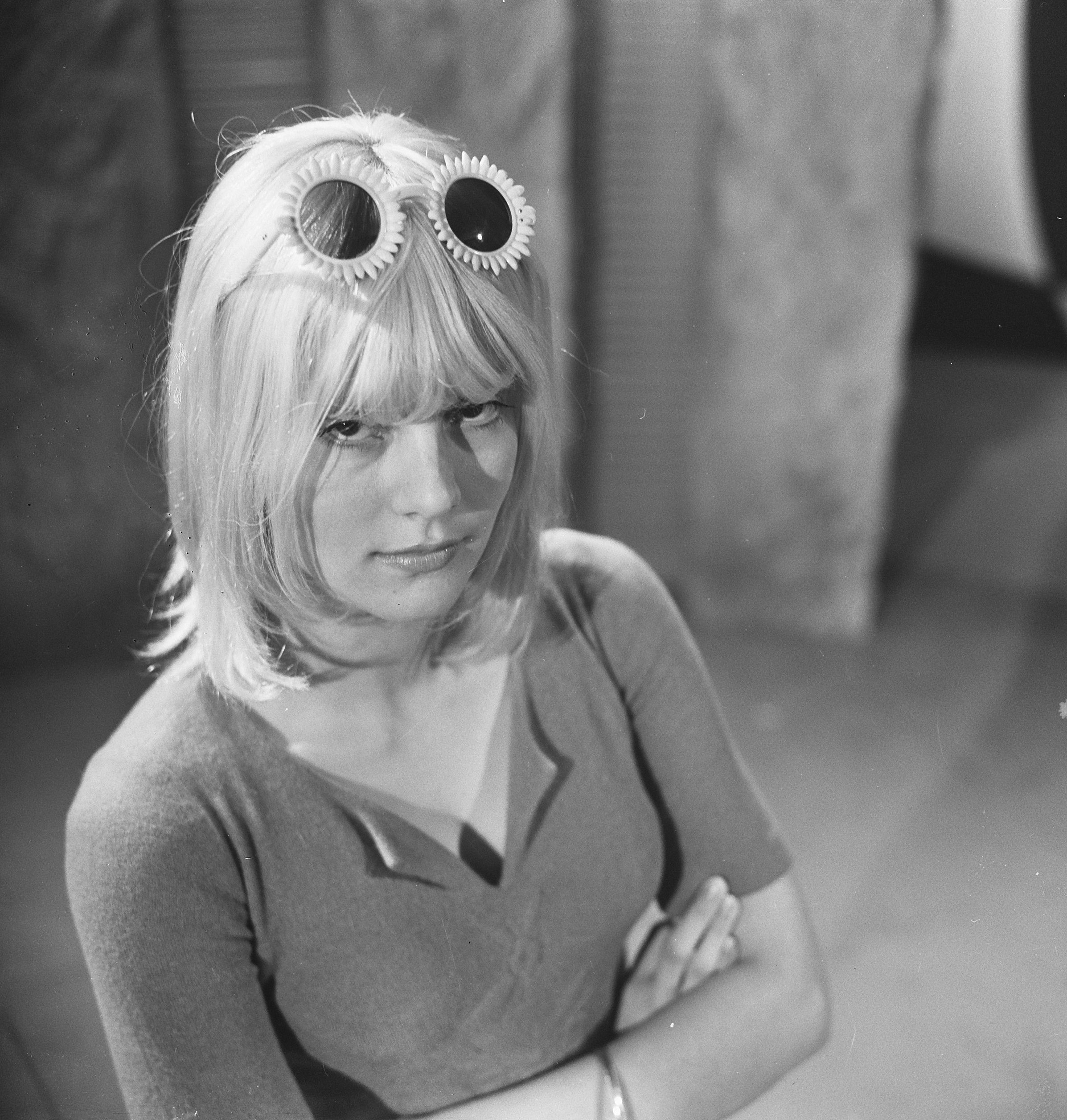
Vartan in March 1966

The album Sylvie à Nashville included the hits "La plus belle pour aller danser" and "Si je chante" and three new songs in English (one featuring Paul Anka). Accompanied by the movie Cherchez l'idole, the EP with "La plus belle pour aller danser" became number one in France, sold over a million copies in Japan, was very successful in Korea and Spain, and was her first release in Italy. "Il n'a rien retrouvé" became another international hit that year. In January 1964, she appeared at the Paris Olympia as one of the support acts (which also included Trini Lopez) for the Beatles.

A commercial for the "Renown" clothing line and a supporting role in the film Patate increased her fame. She also appeared on The Ed Sullivan Show, Shindig!, Hullabaloo, and an international concert tour, including Canada, South America and Polynesia. In Tokyo she gave 13 concerts in 12 days.

=== Yé-yé singer ===
In December 1964, as Hallyday went into military service, Sylvie's brother Eddie hired two English songwriting session musicians, Tommy Brown on drums and Mick Jones on guitar, as they went to record in New York; they wrote her the hit "Cette lettre-là". On 16 January 1964, Sylvie performed with The Beatles, and opened their show at Olympia. Set in the smart design of the J.C. Averty Show, "Cette lettre-là" was the first of Sylvie Vartan's TV variety night performances.

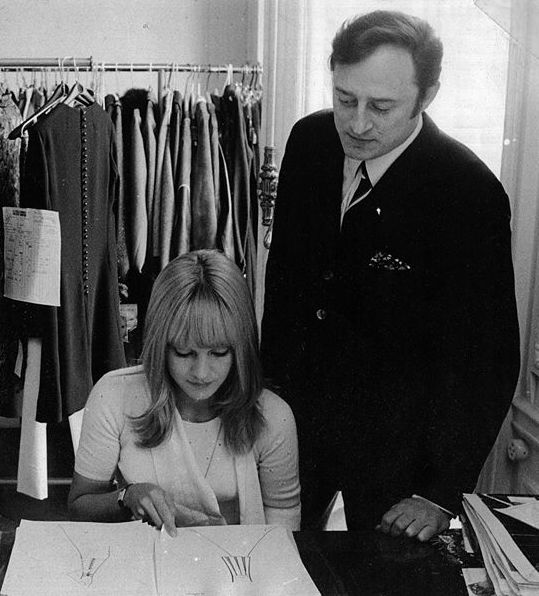
Sylvie Vartan and Jacques Rozenker, her fashion collection director, looking at the sketches for her brand (1968)

In 1965 (and until 1970), Sylvie Vartan founded the ready-to-wear company Les Créations Sylvie Vartan together with businessman Roland Berda, and the company was run by Jacques Rozenker, her fashion collection director. The collections were designed by Emmanuelle Khanh and Christiane Bailly, who had come from the fashion house Chloé.

In 1966–67 she recorded more original hits. "Dis moi, que tu m'aimes" premiered on TV on 9 July 1967 was accompanied by a group of male dancers. "Le jour qui vient" was aired on the Dim Dam Dom program of the French Television 1 in color on 14 January 1968. "2'35 de bonheur" and "Comme un garçon" were other #1s in France, Italy, Belgium, Japan, or Korea.

On 11 April 1968, Vartan suffered injuries in a traffic accident but was back on tour in August. She showed off her new sexy cabaret-dancer image to the French TV audience in the "Jolie poupée" show on 4 December 1968; the collaboration with Maritie and Gilbert Carpentier produced a highly entertaining result. The variety night included the performance of "Irrésistiblement", accompanied by elaborate girl-group choreography, and "Jolie Poupée", a dialogue between a doll Sylvie and an adult one.

The hits of the "Jolie poupée" show were released as the Maritza album. In Italy, she released a cover version of Mina's "Zum zum zum". Being the 23rd-biggest-selling single of 1969 in Italy, Vartan's version did better in Italian charts than Mina's original. Vartan continued with her one-woman shows at the Paris Olympia in December 1968; they were published as the documentary Sylvie à L'Olympia.

For nine Saturday nights in winter of 1969, Vartan starred in the Doppia coppia variety nights of RAI, performing her hits "Irrésistiblement" ("Irresistibilmente") and "Le jour qui vient" ("Una cicala canta") in Italian. In March 1969, "Irresistibilmente" entered the Italian charts at No. 3, peaked at No. 2 and stayed in Top Ten for 10 weeks. In 1969 the single was the No. 22 single on the Italian chart. The tender ballad "Blam blam blam", written especially for Doppia coppia, peaked at No. 14 on the Italian charts and was among the 100 biggest-selling singles in Italy in 1969.

After her world tour in autumn 1969, she returned to Italy to perform "Festa negli occhi, festa nel cuore" on a Canzonissima variety night and "C'est un jour à rester couché" on the Incontro con Sylvie Vartan TV show, recorded in the Gattopardo Club of Messina. Her appearances were popular in Italy and France; she donned a different costume for each song, including plenty of short skirts and Barbarella boots. The cartoonists of both countries even drew Sylvie Vartan lookalikes.

=== 1970–present ===
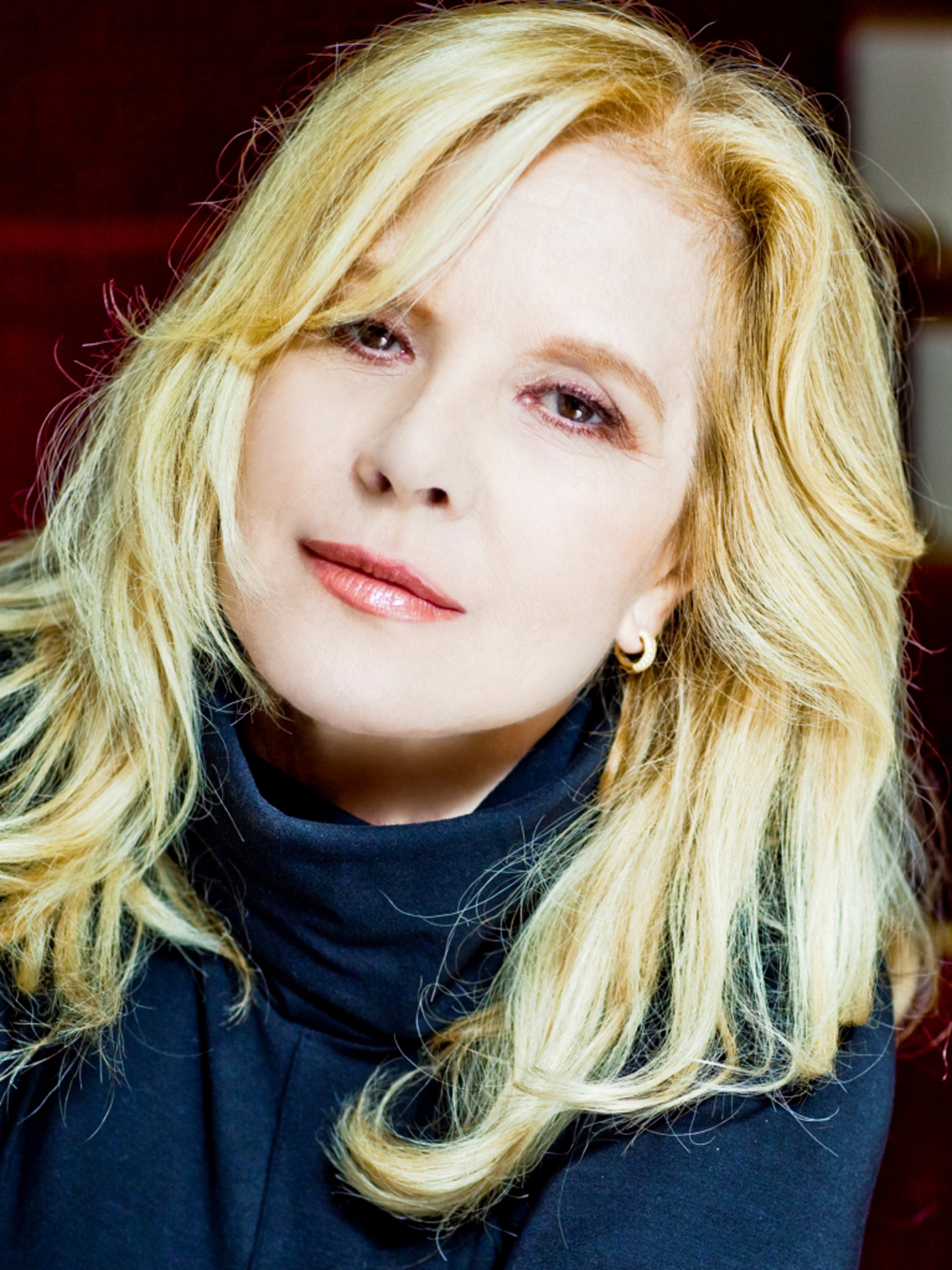
Vartan in 2009

Despite suffering a second serious car accident in 1970, Sylvie Vartan continued to perform and record extensively; and in 1972 she starred in the film Malpertuis. She sold millions of records on the RCA label, which made her its most prolific artist after Elvis Presley. Her most famous songs are "J'ai un probleme", "L'amour au Diapason" (73), "Parle moi de ta vie"(71), "Petit rainbow" (77), "Bye Bye Leroy Brown" (74), "Disco Queen" and "Nicolas" (79), and "Caro Mozart", an international hit in Italian (72). However, her annual world tours and Italian TV shows continued to include her biggest late-1960s hits.

In 1976 she recorded "Qu'est-ce qui fait pleurer les blondes?", a cover of a John Kongos track, which topped the French chart for several weeks. Her disco era climaxed at the Dancing star TV show on TF1, produced by Maritie and Gilbert Carpentier, on 10 September 1977. RCA published the show as the Dancing star After a week of concerts in Las Vegas in 1982, she released a duet with John Denver: "Love Again", a #85 single on Billboard Hot 100 followed in 1985 by a new album in the US with "Double Exposure" and "One-Shot Lover". In 1986 she took a break from show business; she returned in 1989 with "C'est Fatal" ("E' Fatale" in Italy).

In 1990, Vartan gave a concert at Sofia's Palace of Culture, opening and closing with a Bulgarian song. This was her first visit to the city since her emigration.

In 1991, she performed for three weeks at the Palais des Sports in Paris and hit the charts with "Quand tu es là". In 1995, she starred in "L'ange noir" directed by Jean-Claude Brisseau. In 1996 Sylvie recorded a successful album ("Toutes les femmes ont un secret") featuring "Je n'aime encore que toi" written by Quebecer Luc Plamondon. After her brother Eddie died in 2001, she took another break from performing in public. In fall 2004 Vartan started recording and giving concerts of jazz ballads in francophone countries and Japan. She performed two weeks in the Palais des congrès in 2004 and 2008—all sold-out concerts. In 2009 she toured Turkey, France, Japan, Switzerland, Quebec, USA, Italy, Spain, Netherlands and Belgium.

== Legacy ==
In 2005, the singer was appointed as WHO Goodwill Ambassador for Maternal and Child Health in the European Region. In addition to French, Vartan has also regularly performed in English, as well as has sung a few of her most well-known songs in Bulgarian, Italian, and, phonetically, in Spanish, Chinese, Japanese and German.

== Honours ==
- Chevalier (Knight) of the Ordre national du Mérite on 13 November 1987, Officier (Officer) in 2006.
- Chevalier (Knight) of the Legion of Honour on 14 November 1998, Officier (Officer) in 2009.

== Personal life ==
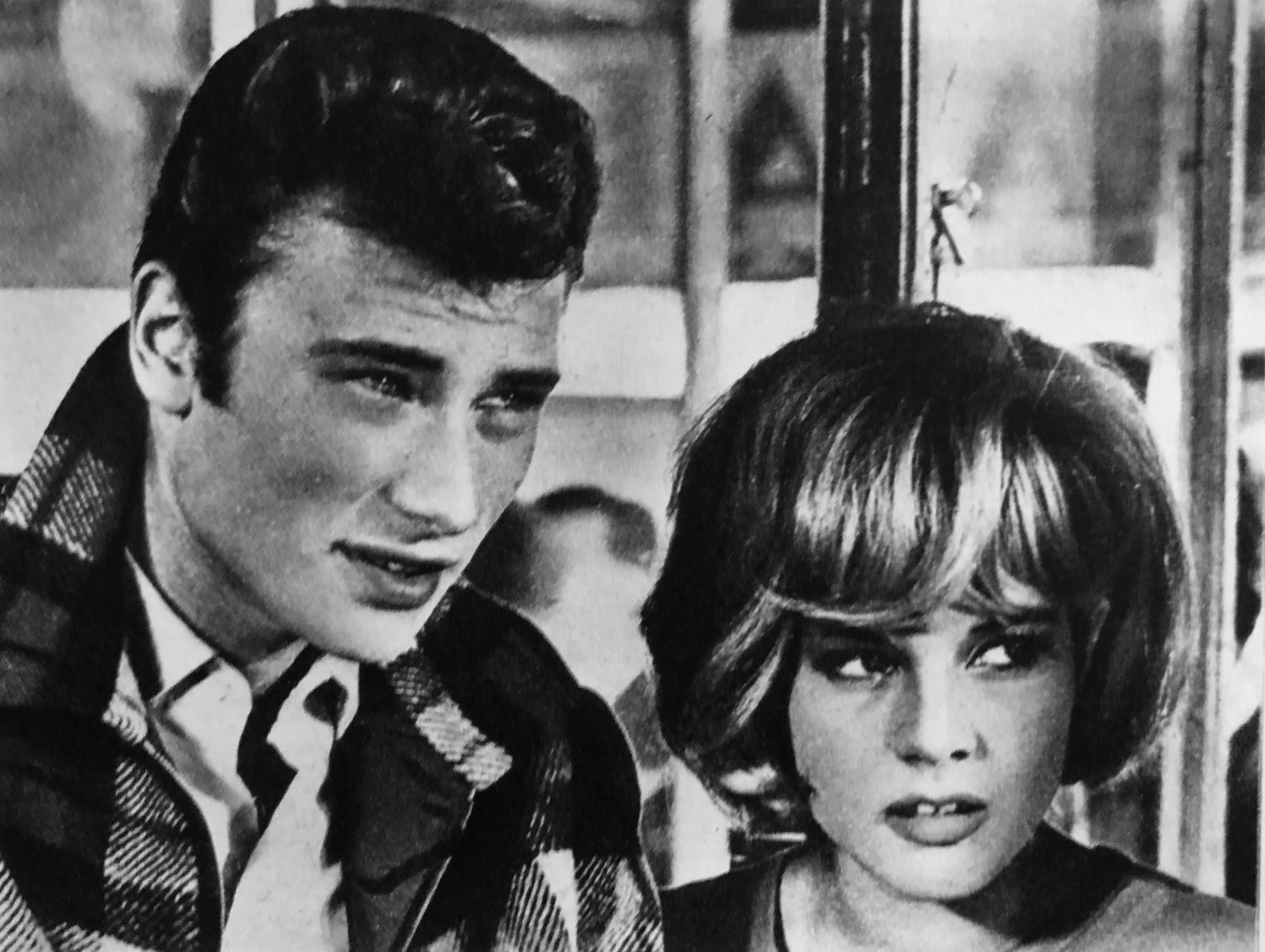
Vartan with her first husband Johnny Hallyday in 1965

In 1962, during her second concert in Paris Olympia Hall, Vartan met pop-rock singer Johnny Hallyday; they were married in Loconville on 12 April 1965. They had a son, David Michael Benjamin Smet, later known as David Hallyday. The couple divorced in 1980. Vartan later married record producer Tony Scotti, and, together, they adopted a 7 months old baby girl from Bulgaria, born in 1997, and whom they named Darina.

Vartan is the aunt of American actor Michael Vartan, the son of her brother Eddie Vartan.

== Discography ==
- Sylvie (1962)
- Twiste et chante (1963)
- Sylvie a Nashville (1964)
- A gift wrapped from Paris (1965)
- Il y a deux filles en moi (1966)
- 2'35 de bonheur (1967)
- Comme un garçon (1967)
- La Maritza (1968)
- Aime-moi (1970)
- Sympathie (1971)
- Untitled (J'ai un problème) (1973)
- Je chante pour Swanee (1974)
- Shang shang a lang (1974)
- Qu'est-ce qui fait pleurer les blondes? (1976)
- Sylvie Vartan (Ta sorcière bien-aimée) (1976)
- Georges (1977)
- Dancing Star (1977)
- Fantaisie (1978)
- I Don't Want the Night to End (1979)
- Déraisonnable (1979)
- Bienvenue solitude (1980)
- Ça va mal (1981)
- De choses et d'autres (1982)
- Danse ta vie (1983)
- Des heures de désir (1984)
- Made in USA (1985)
- Virage (1986)
- Confidanses (1989)
- Vent d'ouest (1992)
- Sessions acoustiques (1994)
- Toutes les femmes ont un secret (1996)
- Sensible (1998)
- Sylvie (2004)
- Nouvelle vague (2007)
- Toutes peines confondues (2009)
- Soleil bleu (2010)
- Sylvie in Nashville (2013)
- Une vie en musique (2015)
- Avec toi (2018)
- Merci pour le regard (2021)

== Filmography ==
- Pod igoto (1952), after the novel by Ivan Vazov (Under the Yoke)
- Un clair de lune à Maubeuge (1962)
- Cherchez l'idole (1963)
- D'où viens-tu, Johnny? (1964)
- Patate (1964)
- Malpertuis (1971)
- L'ange noir (1994)
- Mausolée pour une garce (2001) (TV)
- The Missionaries (2014)
- Once Upon My Mother (Ma mère, Dieu et Sylvie Vartan) (2025)

== Bibliography ==
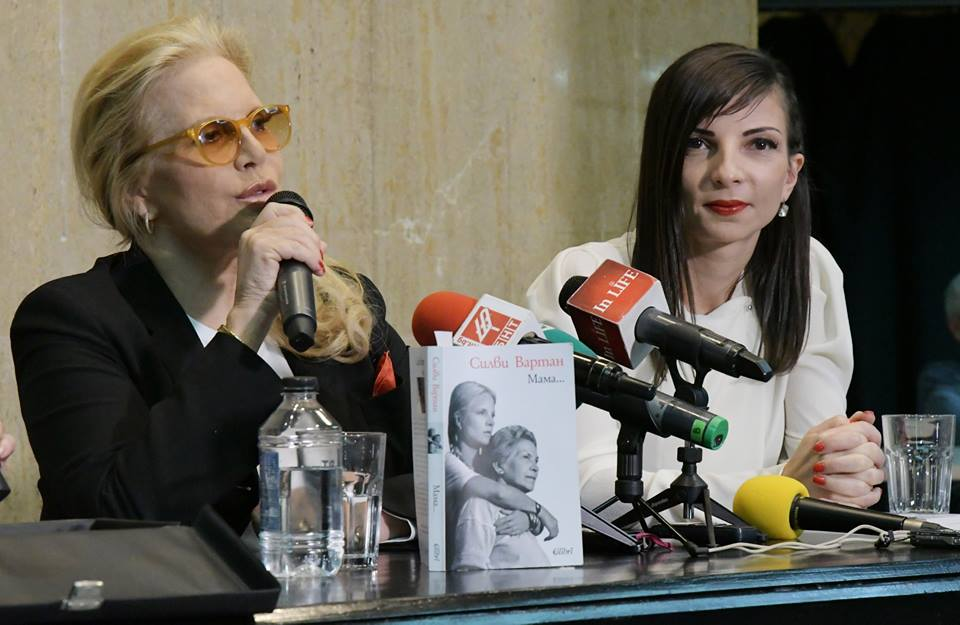
Vartan (left) presenting her book Mama at the 2017 Book Fair in Sofia

- Jour après jour, by Frédéric Quinonéro – 2008 ISBN 978-2841675449
- Sylvie Vartan dans la lumière, autobiography, Xo – 2007 ISBN 978-2-84563-337-7
- Entre l'ombre et la lumière, autobiography, Xo – 2004, ISBN 2-84563-195-2
- Sylvie Vartan, by Camilio Daccache and Isabelle Salmon, Vaderetro – 1996, ISBN 2-909828-41-7
- Sylvie Vartan, une fille de l'Est, by Eric Cazalot and Christian Cazalot, Express Prelude & Fugue – 2003, ISBN 2-84343-163-8
- Sylvie Vartan, Revue de mode, Paris-Musées – 2004, ISBN 2-87900-847-6
- Dictionnaire des chansons de Sylvie Vartan, by Benoît Cachin, Tournon – 2005, ISBN 2-914237-34-0
