= Bloodrock Live =

Live album by Bloodrock
- Released: May 1972
- Recorded: 1971
- Length: 60:32
- Label: Capitol

Bloodrock chronology
| Bloodrock U.S.A. (1971) | Bloodrock Live (1972) | Passage (1972) |

Professional ratings
Review scores
| Source | Rating |
|---|---|
| Allmusic | 1/5 stars |

Bloodrock Live is an only live double album by Bloodrock, released in May 1972 through Capitol Records.

While the album was marketed as being a live performance at the Chicago Stadium , three of the album's songs ("You Gotta Roll", "Cheater" and "Kool-Aid Kids") were actually studio recordings with dubbed applause.

== Track listing ==
Disc 1
| No. | Title | Writer(s) | Original album | Length |
|---|---|---|---|---|
| 1. | "Castle of Thoughts" | Jim Rutledge, Lee Pickens | Bloodrock | 3:16 |
| 2. | "Breach of Lease" | Ed Grundy, Rutledge, Rick Cobb, Steve Hill | Bloodrock 3 | 9:56 |
| 3. | "Lucky in the Morning" | John Nitzinger | Bloodrock 2 | 6:01 |
| 4. | "Kool-Aid Kids" | Nitzinger | Bloodrock 3 | 6:25 |
| 5. | "D.O.A." | Bloodrock | Bloodrock 2 | 9:46 |

Disc 2
| No. | Title | Writer(s) | Original album | Length |
|---|---|---|---|---|
| 1. | "You Gotta Roll" | Rutledge, Nitzinger, Hill | Bloodrock 3 | 5:05 |
| 2. | "Cheater" | Bloodrock | Bloodrock 2 | 6:43 |
| 3. | "Jessica" | Nitzinger | Bloodrock 3 | 4:44 |
| 4. | "Gotta Find a Way" | Bloodrock, except Cobb | Bloodrock | 9:56 |
| Total length: | | | | 60:32 |

== Credits ==
- Bloodrock Primary Artist
- Rick Cobb Composer, Drums, Percussion
- Ed Grundy Bass, Composer, Vocals
- Kenneth Hamann Engineer
- Stephen Hill Composer, Keyboards, Vocals
- John Hoernle Art Direction
- Andy Kent Photography
- John Nitzinger Composer
- Lee Pickens Composer, Guitar, Vocals
- Neal Preston Photography
- Jim Rutledge Composer, Remixing, Vocals
- Nick Taylor Composer, Guitar, Vocals

== Charts ==
| Chart (1972) | Peak position |
|---|---|
| Canada Top Albums/CDs (RPM) | 40 |
| US Billboard 200 | 67 |
