= Reflections (Terry Knight and the Pack album) =

Studio album by Terry Knight and the Pack
- Released: March 1967
- Genre: Rock; garage rock
- Length: 35:23
- Label: Lucky Eleven
- Producer: Terry Knight

Terry Knight and the Pack chronology
Terry Knight and the Pack (1966)	Reflections (1967)	Mark, Don & Terry 1966–67 (1972)

Reflections is the second and final studio album by Terry Knight and the Pack, the short-lived American garage rock band from Flint, Michigan.

== Track listing ==
Side one

1. "One Monkey (Don't Stop No Show)" – (Joe Tex) – 2:32
2. "Love, Love, Love, Love, Love" – (Terry Knight) – 2:40
3. "Come With Me" – (Knight) – 2:35
4. "Got To Find My Baby" – (Knight) – 2:45
5. "This Precious Time" – (P. F. Sloan, Steve Barri) – 2:30
6. "Anybody's Appletree" – (Knight) – 2:30

Side two

1. "The Train" – (Knight) – 2:05
2. "Dimestore Debutant" – (Knight) – 4:15
3. "Love Goddess Of The Sunset Strip" – (Knight) – 3:33
4. "Forever And A Day" – (Knight) – 2:58
5. "(I Can't Get No) Satisfaction" – (Jagger/Richards) – 3:50

== Personnel ==
- Terry Knight – vocals, production
- Curt Johnson – guitar
- Bob Caldwell – organ
- Mark Farner – bass
- Don Brewer – drums
