= Unspoken Words =

Unspoken Words may refer to:

- "Unspoken Words", a song by Status Quo from the album Piledriver, 1972
- "Unspoken Words", a song by U.D.O. from the album Faceless World, 1990
- "Unspoken Words", a song by Theatre des Vampires from the album Anima Noir, 2008
- "Unspoken Words", a song by Gotthard from the album Need to Believe, 2009
- "Unspoken Words", a song by Mxmtoon from the album The Masquerade, 2019
- "Unspoken Words", a 2008 single by Ashley Alexandra Dupré
- "Unspoken Words", a 2019 single by Davichi
- Unspoken Words, a 1988 album by Jeff Golub
- Unspoken Words, a 1989 album by Avery Sharpe
- Unspoken Words, a 1996 album by Per Jørgensen and Tobias Sjøgren
- Unspoken Words, a 1998 album by Jim Cohn
- Unspoken Words, unfinished album by Bloodrock released as part of Triptych, 2000
- "Musica proibita", 1881 Stanislao Gastaldon composition published in English under the title "Unspoken Words"

== See also ==
- Words Unspoken (disambiguation)
