= Terry Knight and the Pack (album) =

Studio album by Terry Knight and the Pack
- Released: September 1966
- Recorded: 1966
- Studio: Audio Recording Studios, Cleveland, Ohio, Cameo-Parkway Studios, Philadelphia, Pennsylvania
- Genre: Garage rock; rock
- Length: 33:43
- Label: Lucky Eleven
- Producer: Terry Knight

Terry Knight and the Pack chronology
"Terry Knight and the Pack" (1966)	Reflections (1967)

Professional ratings
Review scores
Source	Rating
Allmusic	1.5/5 stars

Terry Knight and the Pack is the debut studio album by the American garage rock band, Terry Knight and the Pack. On this record, future Grand Funk Railroad alumni such as Mark Farner, appear. Vocalist Terry Knight wrote the bulk of the 12 tracks, barring the four cover versions.

Their biggest hit, appearing on this album, called "I (Who Have Nothing)" became a regional hit and charted at number 46, nationally. The band would be limited in their success due to Knight's dismal vocal range.

== Track listing ==
- All songs written by Terry Knight, except where noted.
1. "Numbers" 2:25
2. "What's on Your Mind" 1:45
3. "Where Do You Go" (Sonny Bono) 3:05
4. "You're a Better Man Than I" (Brian Hugg, Mike Hugg) 2:48
5. "Lovin' Kind" 2:50
6. "The Shut-In" 3:10
7. "Got Love" 3:18
8. "Change on the Way" 3:15
9. "Lady Jane" (Mick Jagger, Keith Richards) 2:53
10. "Sleep Talking" 3:02
11. "I've Been Told" 2:20
12. "I (Who Have Nothing)" (Carlo Donida, Jerry Leiber, Mike Stoller, Mogol) 3:05

== Personnel ==
- Terry Knight – vocals, piano, harpsichord, harmonica
- Bob Caldwell – organ, bells, vocals
- Curt Johnson – guitar, vocals
- Herm Jackson, Mark Farner – bass guitar
- Don Brewer – drums, percussion, vocals
- "Ralph" – additional drums and percussion
- Strings arranged by Richard Rome
