= Bloodrock U.S.A. =

Studio album by Bloodrock
- Released: October 1971
- Studio: Capitol
- Genre: Hard rock
- Label: Capitol
- Producers: Bloodrock, John Palladino

Bloodrock chronology
Bloodrock 3 (1971)	Bloodrock U.S.A. (1971)	Bloodrock Live (1972)

Professional ratings
Review scores
Source	Rating
Allmusic	2.5/5 stars

Bloodrock U.S.A. is the fourth album by the Texan rock band Bloodrock, released on Capitol Records in October 1971. The album was the first produced by the band alone without Terry Knight and the last studio album to feature original members Jim Rutledge (vocals) and Lee Pickens (lead guitar).

== Track listing ==
No.	Title	Writer(s)	Length
1.	"It's a Sad World"	Bill Ham / Warren Ham	4:26
2.	"Don't Eat the Children"	John Nitzinger	3:17
3.	"Promises"	Nitzinger	3:11
4.	"Crazy 'Bout You Babe"	R. Kates / S. Garrett	2:41
5.	"Hangman's Dance"	Nitzinger	6:02
6.	"American Burn"	Lee Pickens / Jim Rutledge / Nick Taylor	3:59
7.	"Rock & Roll Candy Man"	Ed Grundy / Jim Rutledge	3:09
8.	"Abracadaver"	Rick Cobb / Lee Pickens / Jim Rutledge / Nick Taylor	4:09
9.	"Magic Man"	Rick Cobb / Lee Pickens / Jim Rutledge	7:13
10.	"Erosion" (CD bonus track)	Nitzinger	2:45

== Personnel ==
- Jim Rutledge: Vocals
- Lee Pickens: Vocals, Guitars
- Nick Taylor: Guitars, Vocals
- Stephen Hill: Keyboards, Vocals
- Ed Grundy: Bass, Vocals
- Rick Cobb: Drums, Percussion

== Production ==
- Arranged by Bloodrock
- Produced by Bloodrock and John Palladino
- Recorded and Mixed by John "Sly" Wilson
- Art Direction by John Hoernle
- Photography by Norman Seeff

== Charts ==
Chart (1971–72)	Peak position
Canada Top Albums/CDs (RPM)	87
US Billboard 200	88

== Notes ==
- The song "It's a Sad World" was originally performed by Israfel.
- The album was reissued under One Way Records in 1998 featuring the bonus track "Erosion".
