= Triptych (Bloodrock album) =

Compilation album by Bloodrock
- Released: September 2000
- Genre: Progressive rock; Southern rock
- Label: One Way Records

Bloodrock chronology
D.O.A. (1989)	Triptych (2000)	Bloodrock 2013 (2013)

Triptych is a two-disc compilation by Texan rock band Bloodrock released under One Way Records in 2000. The material on the first disc consists of the 1972 album, Passage, and the first half of the 1973 album Whirlwind Tongues. The second disc consists of the last half of Whirlwind Tongues and unfinished material of the would-be late 1974 album, which Capitol Records refused to release at the time due to Bloodrock's waning popularity.

The unfinished material did not have a collective name until its release in 2000, when keyboardist Steve Hill suggested it be called Unspoken Words.

== Track listing ==
=== Disc one ===
1. "Help Is on the Way" – 4:35
2. "Scottsman" – 3:45
3. "Juice" – 3:37
4. "The Power" – 4:23
5. "Life Blood" – 5:39
6. "Days and Nights" – 7:56
7. "Lost Fame" – 4:15
8. "Thank You Daniel Ellsberg" – 3:14
9. "Fantasy" – 5:25
10. "It's Gonna Be Love" – 3:25
11. "Sunday Song" – 4:22
12. "Parallax" – 3:43
13. "Voices" – 3:40
14. "Eleanor Rigby" – 3:16

=== Disc two ===
1. "Stilled by Whirlwind Tongues" – 5:39
2. "Guess What I Am" – 3:00
3. "Lady of Love" – 3:59
4. "Jungle" – 4:30
5. "Gonna Help You" – 3:31
6. "The Right Time" – 2:24
7. "Unspoken Words" – 2:59
8. "Afternoon" – 2:25
9. "Chicken Fried" – 2:54
10. "Pogo Stick" – 2:35
11. "For the Ladies" – 4:35
12. "Cerberus" – 3:09
13. "Follow" – 3:19
