= Mark, Don & Terry: 1966–67 =

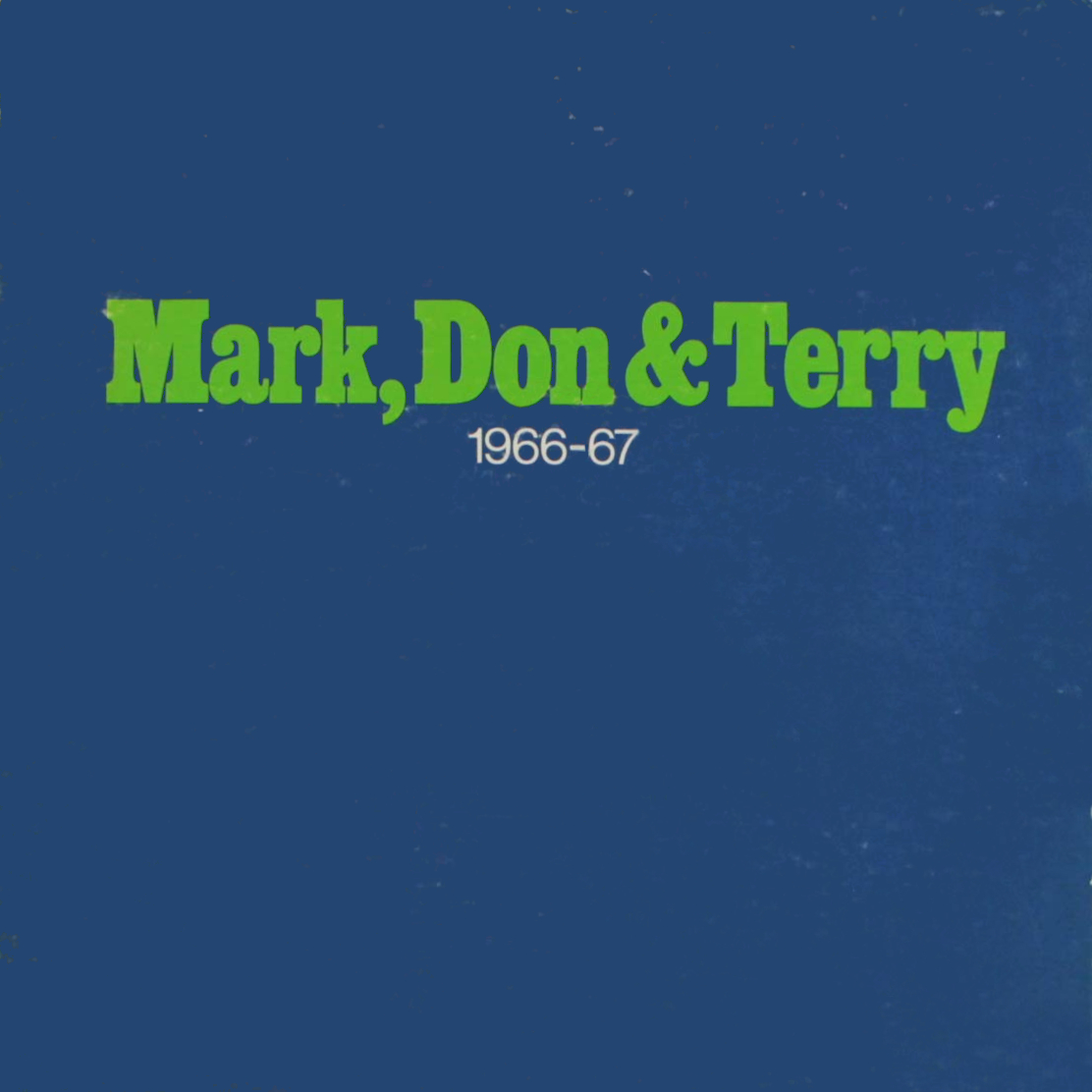

Compilation album by Terry Knight and the Pack
- Released: November 1972
- Recorded: 1966–1967
- Genre: Garage rock
- Label: ABKCO
- Producer: Terry Knight

Mark, Don & Terry: 1966–67 is a November 1972 2-LP set compilation album by the American garage rock band Terry Knight and the Pack released on ABKCO Records in an effort to cash in on the March 1972 Capitol Records double album Mark, Don & Mel: 1969–71 by Grand Funk Railroad. The album has a plain blue cover with green lettering similar to that of the plain black cover with red lettering of the earlier Grand Funk Railroad release. Mark Farner and Don Brewer from Grand Funk had been in Terry Knight and The Pack with Terry Knight, who then managed them until 1972. Knight also managed the Ft. Worth Texas group Bloodrock until mid 1971.

== Track listing ==
- All songs written by Terry Knight, except where noted.
1. (I Can't Get No) Satisfaction - (Jagger/Richards)
2. Dimestore Debutante
3. The Shut In
4. I've Been Told
5. Numbers
6. Got Love
7. Lady Jane - (Jagger/Richards)
8. Sleep Talking
9. Love Goddess of Sunset Strip
10. Dirty Lady
11. I (Who Have Nothing) - (Carlo Donida, Jerry Leiber, Mike Stoller, Mogol)
12. Lizabeth Peach - (Anthony Paul Byrne)
13. Forever and a Day
14. Bad Boy - (Gerry Goffin/Carole King)
15. Mister, You're a Better Man Than I - (Brian Hugg, Mike Hugg)
16. Love, Love, Love, Love
17. This Precious Time - (P. F. Sloan, Steve Barri)
18. Lovin' Kind
19. Come With Me
20. A Change on the Way
21. One Monkey Don't Stop No Show - (Joe Tex)
