= D.O.A. (song) =

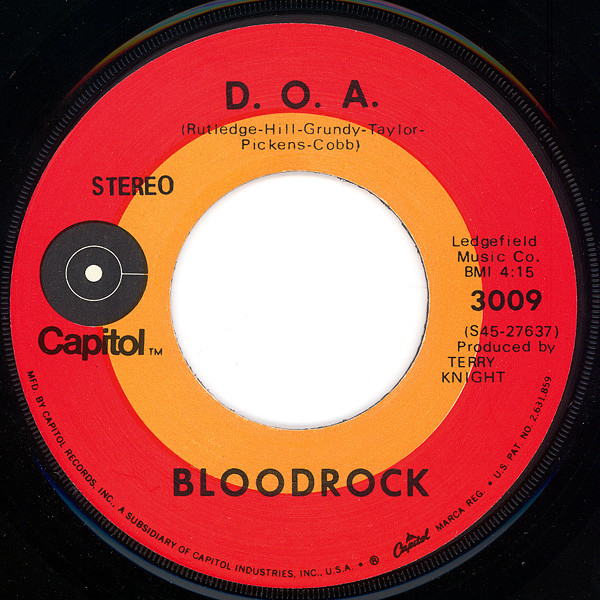

Single by Bloodrock

from the album Bloodrock 2
- B-side: "Children's Heritage"
- Released: December 1970
- Recorded: Summer 1970
- Genre: Psychedelic rock, hard rock
- Length: 8:30 (album version); 4:32 (single version)
- Label: Capitol
- Songwriters: Rutledge, Pickens, Grundy, Taylor, Hill, Cobb
- Producer: Terry Knight

Bloodrock singles chronology
"Gotta Find a Way" (1970)	"D.O.A." (1970)	"Jessica" (1971)

"D.O.A." is a song by Texas hard-rock band Bloodrock, released by Capitol Records in early 1971. It was the band's only single to chart on the Billboard Hot 100. It is remembered for its graphic lyrics and creepy, dirge-like sound.

== Synopsis ==
The song is sung from the perspective of a man who has survived a mid-air collision. The lyrics describe in graphic detail what he remembers of the collision ("we were flying along...and hit something in the air") and his current condition. He is "lying [there], looking at the ceiling", presumably in the back of an ambulance, his arms have been battered (he has no feeling in them and can feel blood running down them) and he has lost one of them (when he looks at his arm, he sees "nothing there"). Additionally, his girlfriend was killed in the accident ("the girl I knew has such a distant stare"). An ambulance attendant, who sees that the pilot is gravely injured, whispers to an associate that "there's no chance for [him]." The singer's last words, other than a reprise of the chorus, are an acceptance of his fate and a plea to "God in heaven, teach me how to die!" Towards the end, the tempo slows and fades into silence, depicting the pilot's loss of consciousness and eventual death. As per the title of the song, the pilot is D.O.A. (dead on arrival). The song has a particular focus on minor keys and flatted fifth notes; played on a Hammond organ, this creates an extremely creepy aura.

== Background ==
The motivation for writing this song was explained in 2005 by guitarist Lee Pickens. “When I was 17, I wanted to be an airline pilot,” Pickens said. “I had just gotten out of this airplane with a friend of mine, at this little airport, and I watched him take off. He went about 200 feet in the air, rolled and crashed.” The band decided to write a song around the incident and include it on their second album.

== Chart performance ==
The single version of "D.O.A." is roughly half the length of the longer version found on the album Bloodrock 2. Many US radio stations refused to play "D.O.A." and the song was banned at several high schools. Despite a lack of airplay, the single still reached number 36 on the Billboard chart.

The song was later included in a compilation album entitled Death, Glory and Retribution in 1985 that consisted of death, protest and "answer" songs by various artists.

== Track listing ==
1. "D.O.A." - 4:32 (single version)
2. "Children's Heritage" - 3:31

== Cover versions ==
- Manilla Road on The Courts of Chaos
- The Fuzztones on Monster A-Go-Go
- Virgin Steele on Nocturnes of Hellfire & Damnation (The Samhain Suite bonus CD)
