= Words Unspoken =

Words Unspoken may refer to:

- "Words Unspoken", a song by Supertramp from their 1970 self-titled debut album
- Words Unspoken, a 2008 album by Gilad Hekselman
- Words Unspoken, a 2011 album by Barbara Dickson

== See also ==
- Unspoken Words (disambiguation)
