= Terry Knight and the Pack =

American garage rock band

- Also known as: The Pack; The Fabulous Pack
- Origin: Flint, Michigan, United States
- Genres: Rock
- Years active: 1965–1969
- Labels: Lucky Eleven; Cameo-Parkway; ABKCO
- Past members: Terry Knight (vocals); Don Brewer (drums); Mark Farner (guitar, bass); Bobby Caldwell (organ); Herm Jackson (bass); Curt Johnson (guitar); Al Shane (keyboards); Kenny Rich (guitar); Craig Frost (keyboards); Rod Lester (bass)

Terry Knight and the Pack (also known as the Pack and the Fabulous Pack) was an American garage rock band formed in Flint, Michigan, in 1965. The band was signed to the Lucky Eleven label through most of its brief recording career. They produced one national hit with their cover version of the song, "I (Who Have Nothing)". Despite their inability to replicate their success, the band was a frequent attraction in the Michigan rock scene. The Pack was fronted by singer Terry Knight. In 1969 the group disbanded but two members, drummer/vocalist Don Brewer and guitarist Mark Farner, would go on to form another band, Grand Funk Railroad.

== History ==
=== Origins 1964-1965 ===
Former DJ, Knight was tenured in several radio stations before trying his hand at a solo musical career in 1964. As a DJ, he was an early advocate of the Rolling Stones, and imitated their style as soloist and later when he joined the band. His initial efforts, which included an unsuccessful single and local performances, were not met with much success, so Knight persuaded a band known as the Jazz Masters to accept him as their frontman in 1965. The group, impressed by Knight's contacts in the music industry, accepted him into the band. Knight quickly took control of the band, first by changing their name to the Pack, inspired by the Shangri-Las' hit, "Leader of the Pack". and taking the group out of uniforms and switching to a more casual look similar to the Rolling Stones. In the band, Knight became the singer and songwriter. Don Brewer played drums, Herm Jackson was on bass guitar, Curt Johnson was on lead guitar, and Bobby Caldwell (April 5, 1947 – February 4, 2016) provided keyboards.

=== Recordings, Popularity 1965-1967 ===
Knight was able to use his contacts to enable the Pack to record their first single, "Tears Come Rolling"/"The Colour of Our Love", at the Golden World Studio in Detroit, released on the Wingate label. At this time the band was managed by Jim Atherton, of Flint, who felt that a traditional label such as Wingate could not properly promote a British-influenced rock group like the Pack. Atherton convinced fellow Flint businessman Otis Ellis to record the band on his small Lucky Eleven label. Before the band recorded their second single, the band name was changed to Terry Knight and the Pack, reflecting Knight's de facto role as the charismatic front man and leader of the group. When Jackson received his draft notice, he left the band, and Mark Farner replaced him on bass.

Six of their nine singles were regional hits in Michigan, Ohio and New York, with two of them – "You're a Better Man Than I" (originally by the Yardbirds) and "I (Who Have Nothing)" (a cover of a Ben E. King song) – reaching the national charts. "I (Who Have Nothing)" went to No. 46 and earned the band an appearance on Dick Clark's television program Where the Action Is. In tmid-1966, Farner left the band to join Dick Wagner's band, the Bossmen, allowing Jackson to return to the group. Their debut album, Terry Knight and the Pack, was released in 1966.

Tracks by the band include: "This Precious Time" (composed and produced by P.F. Sloan), covers of the Rolling Stones' songs "(I Can't Get No) Satisfaction" and "Lady Jane", and several Knight originals: "Numbers", "A Change on the Way" and "Love, Love, Love, Love, Love" (later covered by Detroit roots rockers Brownsville Station). The Music Explosion issued an almost identical version of "Love, Love, Love, Love, Love", with the same instrumental backing track but a different vocal track; it's unclear whether the Pack or the Music Explosion recorded the "original". Due to personality clashes with Knight, Johnson left the band, with Farner returning as guitarist.

TK&TP were mainstays on Cleveland's TV rock & roll showcase, Upbeat. In addition, they opened regional gigs for the Rolling Stones, the Dave Clark Five and the Yardbirds.

=== The Fabulous Pack, Break-Up, Grand Funk Railroad 1967-1969 ===
After the release of their second LP, Reflections, Knight left the band to pursue a frustrated solo career as producer and singer. Meanwhile, the Pack, sometimes playing under the name the Fabulous Pack, continued with Farner replacing Knight as lead singer, and Curt Johnson returning on guitar. The band released a few more 45 RPM singles in 1967 and 1968, starting with their cover of the old Bob and Earl hit, “Harlem Shuffle”. The song's flip side, “I’ve Got News For You”, was written by Dick Wagner, who also wrote the band's next single, “Wide Trackin”, intended for use in an advertising campaign for Pontiac's “wide tracking” automobiles; while a solid regional hit, this single did not chart nationally. Cameo-Parkway went out of business and Capitol Records picked up the remaining Cameo-Parkway contracts, including the Pack. The band went through several personnel changes, with Johnson and Caldwell leaving the group, replaced with Al Shane on keyboards and Kenny Rich on guitar. In April 1968, the Pack released their final single on Capitol Records, a cover version of Jimi Hendrix's Fire retitled "Next To Your Fire", backed with a ballad written by Dick Wagner called "Without A Woman"; while popular in Michigan, this single failed to chart outside the state. By mid 1968, the band consisted of Farner on lead vocals and guitar, Brewer on drums, Craig Frost on keyboards and Rod Lester on bass. In August 1968, the Pack recorded a full-length LP that was never released, with three songs from these sessions, "Getting Into the Sun", "Can't Be Too Long (Faucet)", and "Got This Thing on the Move" subsequently appearing on the compilation album "Thirty Years of Funk: 1969–1999". In early 1969, after a botched tour which left them stranded on Cape Cod, the Pack broke up. Upon returning home, Farner and Brewer regrouped, forming the nucleus of Capitol Records' best-selling act of the early 1970s, Grand Funk Railroad, initially managed and produced by Terry Knight.

=== Reissues ===
All recordings by Terry Knight and the Pack have been out of print since 1973, except for "I (Who Have Nothing)" which is included in the Cameo Parkway 1957–1967 box set. Only one "best of" compilation was released in late 1972 by ABKCO Records as the double album Mark, Don & Terry 1966-67 (plain blue cover) inspired by the Grand Funk Railroad double album Mark, Don & Mel: 1969–71 (plain black cover) released earlier that year on Capitol. The ABKCO-released album was later re-packaged in 1973 as Funk-Off. Both albums are considered collector's items after being dropped from the ABKCO catalog. Another quasi-best-of compilation, Track On, was released on Lucky Eleven c. 1969–70.

Terry Knight and the pack were voted into the Michigan Rock and Roll Legends Hall of Fame in 2008.

== Discography ==
=== Singles ===
Year	A-side/B-side Both sides from same album except where indicated	Label & number	U.S. Chart	Album
Year	A-side/B-side Both sides from same album except where indicated	Label & number	Billboard	Album
1965	"The Tears Come Rollin'" b/w "The Colour of Our Love"	Wingate 007	-	Non-album tracks
1965	"Harlem Shuffle" b/w "I've Got News for You"	Lucky Eleven 003	-	Non-album tracks
1965	"Wide Trackin'" b/w "Does It Matter to You Girl"	Lucky Eleven 007	-	Non-album tracks
1966	"How Much More (Have I Got to Give)" b/w "I've Been Told" (included on first album)	Lucky Eleven 225	-	Non-album tracks
1966	"Better Man Than I" b/w "I Got Love"	Lucky Eleven 226	125	Terry Knight and the Pack
1966	"Lady Jane" b/w "Lovin' Kind"	Lucky Eleven 228	-	Terry Knight and the Pack
1966	"A Change on the Way" b/w "What's on Your Mind"	Lucky Eleven 229	111	Terry Knight and the Pack
1966	"I (Who Have Nothing)" b/w "Numbers"	Lucky Eleven 230	46	Terry Knight and the Pack
1967	"This Precious Time" / "Love Love Love Love Love"	Lucky Eleven 235	120; 117	Reflections
1967	"One Monkey Don't Stop No Show" b/w "The Train"	Lucky Eleven 236	-	Reflections
1968	"Next To Your Fire"" b/w "Without A Woman"	Capitol 2174	-	Non-album tracks

=== Albums ===
- Terry Knight and the Pack (Billboard #127) – Lucky Eleven LE-8000 (Mono)/SLE-8000 (Stereo) (1966)
- Reflections (Original pressing) – Lucky Eleven LE-8001/SLE-8001 (1966)
- Reflections (second pressing) – Cameo C-2007 (Mono)/CS-2007 (Stereo) (1966)

Compilations

- Track On! – The Best of Mark Farner, Terry Knight & Donnie Brewer – Lucky Eleven LE-8001/SLE-8001 (1966)

Issued with same catalog number as the Reflections album, although the legality of this album is in question

- Mark, Don & Terry 1966–67 (Billboard #192) – Abkco 4217 (1972)
- Terry Knight and the Pack and Reflections (Re-release two albums on one CD) – Ace CDCHD 1273 (2010) EAN 029667042123
