= Whirlwind Tongues =

Studio album by Bloodrock
- Released: January 4, 1974
- Recorded: Autumn 1973
- Genre: Progressive rock; psychedelic rock; art rock
- Label: Capitol
- Producer: Bloodrock

Bloodrock chronology
Passage (1972)	Whirlwind Tongues (1974)	Bloodrock 'N' Roll (1975)

Professional ratings
Review scores
Source	Rating
Record World	no rating

Whirlwind Tongues is the sixth and final studio album by the Texan rock band Bloodrock released on January 4, 1974 through Capitol Records.

Drummer Rick Cobb III was replaced on this release by Randy Reeder. The group continued on in their softer progressive rock style as in the previous album Passage.

== Track listing ==
1. "It's Gonna Be Love" – 3:25
2. "Sunday Song" – 4:22
3. "Parallax" – 3:43
4. "Voices – 3:40
5. "Eleanor Rigby" – 3:16
6. "Stilled by Whirlwind Tongues" – 5:39
7. "Guess What I Am" – 3:00
8. "Lady of Love" – 3:59
9. "Jungle" – 4:30

== Personnel ==
- Warren Ham — vocals, saxophone, flute
- Nick Taylor — guitars
- Ed Grundy — bass guitar
- Stevie Hill — keyboards
- Rick Cobb III — drums
- Randy Reeder — drums, percussion
