= Passage (Bloodrock album) =

Studio album by Bloodrock
- Released: September 1972
- Recorded: July 1972
- Genre: Progressive rock
- Label: Capitol
- Producers: Ed Grundy, Peter Granet

Bloodrock chronology
Bloodrock Live (1972)	Passage (1972)	Whirlwind Tongues (1974)

Passage is the fifth studio album by the Texas rock band Bloodrock, released in September 1972 through Capitol Records.

Warren Ham (lead vocals/flute) was added in place of departed original members Jim Rutledge. Lee Pickens (lead guitar) was not replaced, because rhythm guitarist Nick Taylor became the sole guitarist.

== Track listing ==
1. "Help Is on the Way" (Rick Cobb/Steve Hill) – 4:35
2. "Scottsman" (Nick Taylor/Steve Hill/Warren Ham) – 3:45
3. "Juice" (Hill/Ham) – 3:38
4. "The Power" (Mike Pietzsch) – 4:23
5. "Life Blood" (Cobb/Hill/Ham)– 5:38
6. "Days and Nights" (Hill/Ham)– 7:56
7. "Lost Fame" – (Hill/Ham)4:14
8. "Thank You Daniel Ellsberg" (Cobb/Hill)– 3:15
9. "Fantasy" (Hill/Ham)– 5:18

== Personnel ==
- Warren Ham — lead vocals, flute, saxophone, harmonica
- Nick Taylor — guitar, vocals
- Steve Hill — keyboards, vocals
- Ed Grundy — bass, vocals
- Rick Cobb III — drums, percussion

== Charts ==
Chart (1972–73)	Peak position
Canada Top Albums/CDs (RPM)	69
US Billboard 200	105

== Notes ==
- The song "Thank You Daniel Ellsberg" is a tribute to military analyst Daniel Ellsberg.
