= John Nitzinger =

American blues rock guitarist (born 1948)

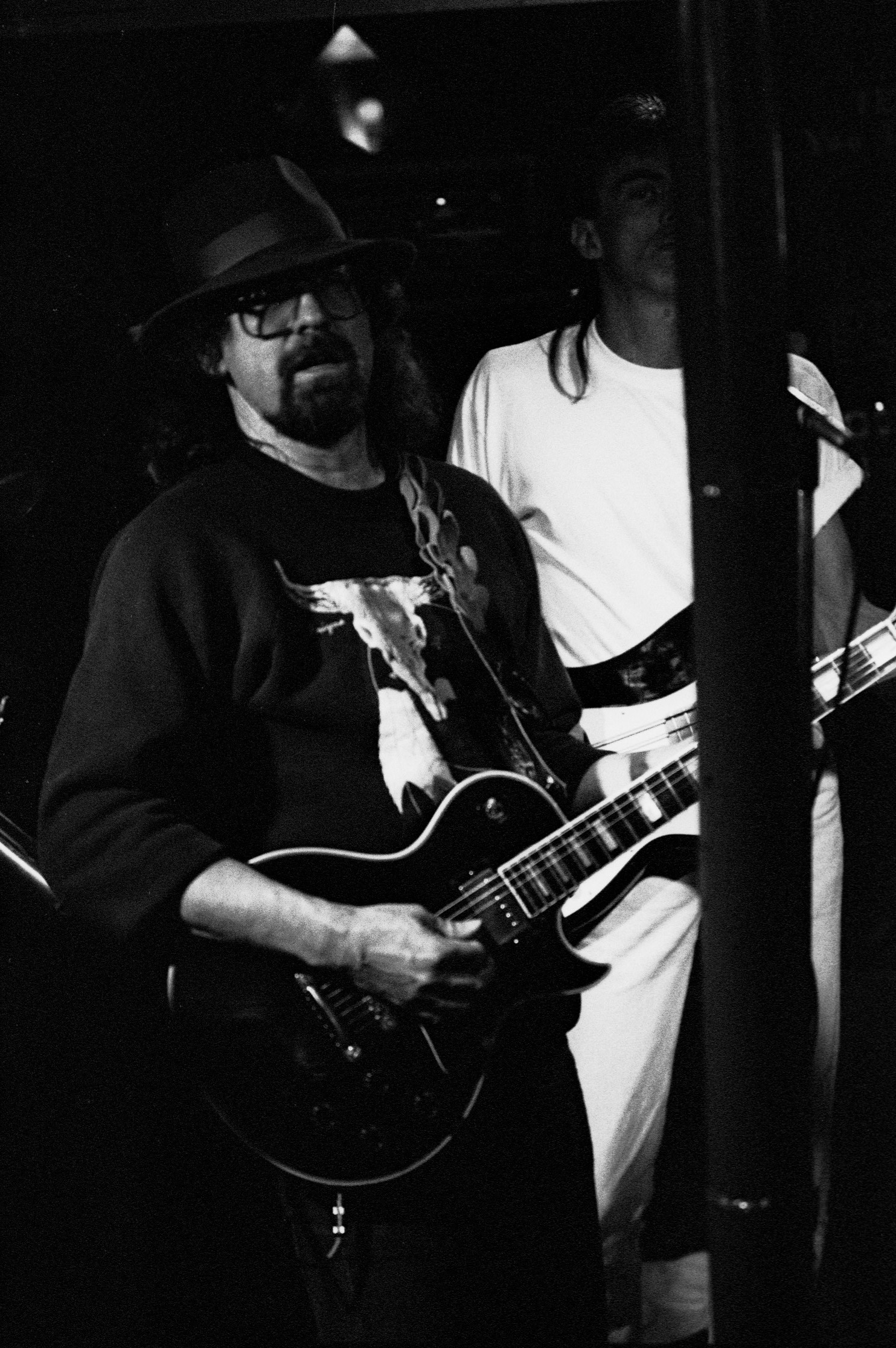
Nitzinger performing in 1993

John Nitzinger (born August 29, 1948) is an American blues rock guitarist, recording artist and songwriter from Fort Worth, Texas.

== Career ==
In the mid-1960s, Nitzinger began his career as a performer touring with Bruce Channel, and became something of a local star with his band "The Barons", releasing several singles before breaking up. In 1968, Nitzinger recorded the single "Plastic Window" (b/w "Life of John Doe") which was produced by a young T Bone Burnett. In the early 1970s, Nitzinger helped pen songs on four albums for the Fort Worth band Bloodrock. When Bloodrock 2 went Gold, Nitzinger signed a contract with Capitol Records and his first album, the self-titled Nitzinger, was released in early 1972. In 1973, his second Capitol album One Foot in History was issued. (Both albums had the same cover, with the first being black and the second being blue). On April 7, 1975, Nitzinger was the opening act for B.B. King at the Longhorn Ballroom, Dallas, Texas. In 1976, a solo album titled Live Better Electrically was issued by 20th Century Records.

In 1980, Nitzinger formed the band PM with Carl Palmer on drums, formerly of Emerson, Lake & Palmer, Barry Finnerty on guitars, Todd Cochran on keyboards and Eric Scott on bass, which released a single album, 1:PM, on Ariola Records. The group performed the single "Dynamite" on German TV show Rockpop. In 1981, Nitzinger joined Alice Cooper on his worldwide Special Forces tour, and featured in Cooper's TV special Alice Cooper à Paris. The following year, Nitzinger co-wrote with Cooper and performed on the album Zipper Catches Skin.

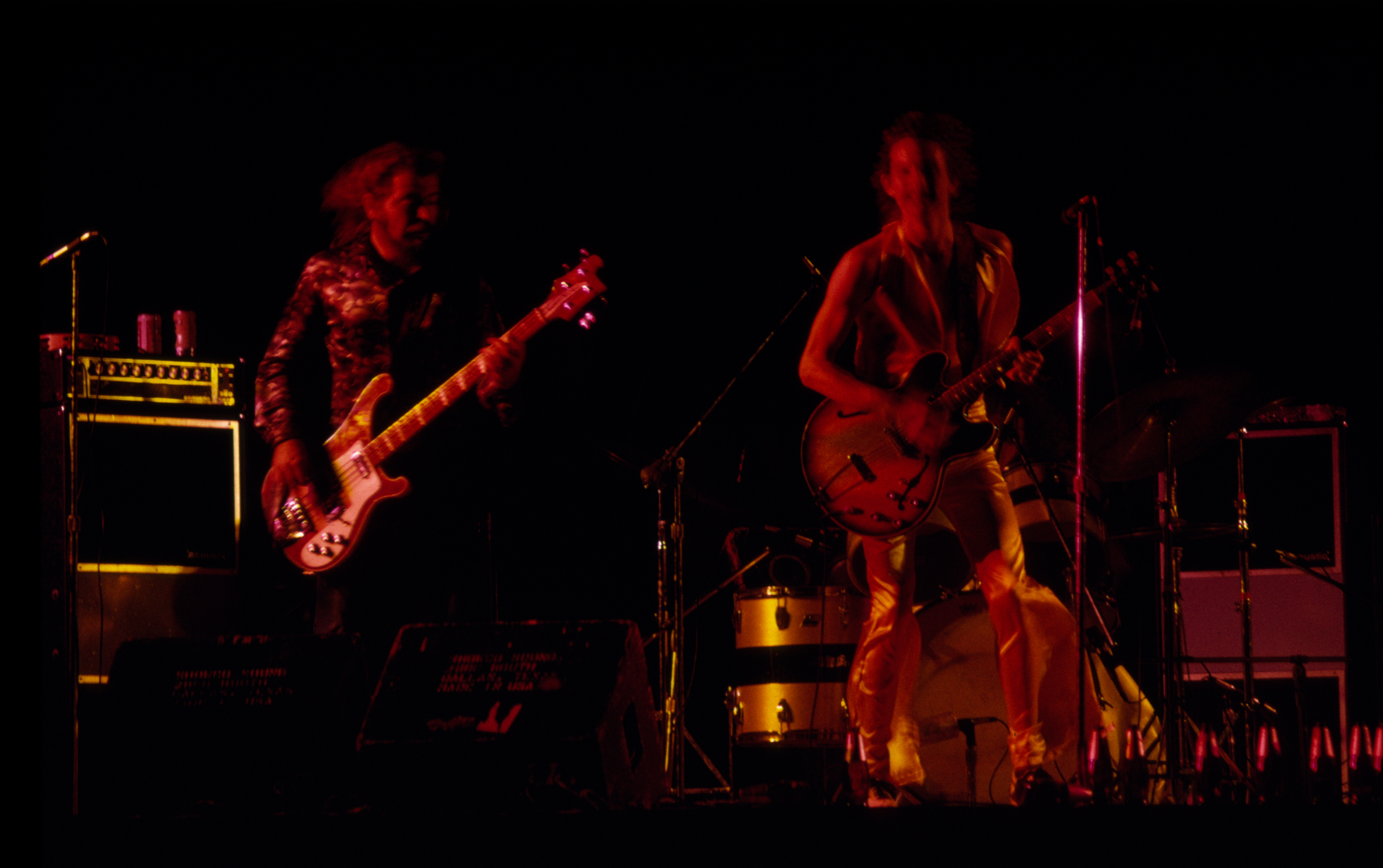
Nitzinger (right) in 1973

After coming off the road, Nitzinger went on hiatus and eventually made a comeback after winning battles with health issues, and today he delivers his message of clean-life choices to schools, hospitals, and prisons. In 2006, he founded Nitzinger's Music Factory working with inner city youth delivering the message of clean living through music lessons, workshops and Rock Camps on the East Side of Fort Worth, Texas.

In 1997, Nitzinger returned to recording solo material and had since released the albums Didja Miss Me (1997), Fingers In The Fan (1999), a compilation of his greatest hits, a box set, and Kiss Of The Mudman (2006) on his independent label, JTH Productions. In 2010, Kiss Of The Mudman was picked up by SPV Records in Europe and was released worldwide. In 2012 the 90-minute DVD documentary, Nitzinger – Tears From There To Here, was released. In 2012, he wrote 12 new songs and completed two albums – Bloodrock 2013 with Bloodrock lead singer, Jim Rutledge, and Revenge with former lead singer of AC/DC, Dave Evans. A promotional music video was made for the lead track.

== Discography ==
=== Studio albums ===
- Nitzinger (1972, Capitol Records)
- One Foot in History (1973, Capitol Records)
- Live Better Electrically (1976, 20th Century Records)
- Didja Miss Me (1997, Indian Trail Records)
- Kiss Of The Mudman (2007, Yellow Label/JTH Productions)

"Live At Rockpalast" (2001, Made In Germany Music)

"Going Back To Texas" (1999, Record Heaven Music)

"John In The Box" (1995, Akarma Italy)

=== Singles ===
- Plastic Window / Life of John Doe (1968, Soft Records)
- Louisiana Cock Fight / L.A. Texas Boy (1972, Capitol Records)
- One Foot In History / Earth Eater (1973, Capitol Records)
- Are You With Me / Yellow Dog (1976, 20th Century Records
- Control / Louisiana Cockflight (2001, Record Heaven Music)

=== Compilations ===
- Various Artists – MAR Y SOL, The First International Puerto Rico Pop Festival (Songs: "Texas Blues / Jelly Roll") (1972, Atco Records)
- Fingers In The Fan '69-99' (1999, Trigger Records)
- John In The Box (2001, Akarma)

With Alice Cooper

- Zipper Catches Skin (1982, Warner Bros.)

With The Barons

- You're Gonna Cry / Without Her 7" (1965, Torch Records)
- You're Gonna Get Hurt / I'll Never Be Happy 7" (1965, Torch Records)
- Don't Burn It / I Hope I Please You 7" (1966, Brownfield Records)
- Live And Die / Don't Look Back 7" (1966, Torch Records)

=== Compilations ===
- Various Artists – Fort Worth Teen Scene! Volume One (Songs: "Without Her", "Don't Blame Me") (2004)
- Various Artists – Fort Worth Teen Scene! Volume Two (Songs: "Live And Die", "I'll Never Be Happy") (2004)
- Various Artists – Fort Worth Teen Scene! Volume Three (Songs: "Don't Burn It", "I Hope I Please You") (2004)

With Bloodrock

- Bloodrock (Composer: "Double Cross", "Wicked Truth", "Melvin Laid An Egg") (1970, Capitol Records)
- Bloodrock 2 (Composer: "Lucky In The Morning", "Sable And Pearl", "Children's Heritage", "Fancy Space Odyssey") (1970, Capitol Records)
- Bloodrock 3 (Composer: "Jessica", "Kool-Aid-Kids", Co-Composer on "You Gotta Roll", "Breach Of Lease") (1971, Capitol Records)
- Bloodrock U.S.A. (Composer: "Don't Eat the Children", "Promises", "Hangman's Dance", "Erosion") (1971, Capitol Records)

With Bob Pickering

- Appaloosa Rider (Composer: "A Debt To Pay") (1973, Capitol Records)

With Cresa Watson

- A Woman Is A Nice Thing / These Boots Are Made For Walking (Composer: "A Woman Is A Nice Thing") (1969, Charay Records)

With David Anderson

- Children Of The Mist (Composer: "Fourteen Days Ago", "For A Few Dollars") (1971, King Records)

With Dave Evans

- Revenge (2013, Bad Reputation)

With Jim Rutledge

- Bloodrock 2013 (2013, Rutledge Publishing)

With PM

- 1:PM (1980, Ariola Records)

With Spearfish

- Affected By Time (Guitar on What Do You Got? & Running Late) (2002, Sweden Rock Records)

With Texas Music Machine

- Texas Gold (1998, Santa Fe Records)

With Thunder

- Thunder (1974, Capitol Records)
