= Bloodrock 2 =

Studio album by Bloodrock
- Released: October 5, 1970
- Recorded: Summer 1970
- Genre: Hard rock
- Length: 43:08
- Label: Capitol
- Producer: Terry Knight

Bloodrock chronology
Bloodrock (1970)	Bloodrock 2 (1970)	Bloodrock 3 (1971)

Singles from Bloodrock 2
- 1. "D.O.A." Released: March 1971

Professional ratings
Review scores
Source	Rating
AllMusic	2.5/5 stars

Bloodrock 2 is the second album by the Texas rock band Bloodrock, released on October 5, 1970, through Capitol Records. The album was certified Gold by the RIAA on January 3, 1990.

== Background ==
In Spring 1971, the gory extended album track "D.O.A." became the biggest hit of Bloodrock's career when it was issued in edited form as a single.

The motivation for writing the song was explained in 2005 by guitarist Lee Pickens. "When I was 17, I wanted to be an airline pilot," Pickens said. "I had just gotten out of this airplane with a friend of mine, at this little airport, and I watched him take off. He went about 200 feet in the air, rolled and crashed."

== Chart performance ==
On RPM's Canada Top Albums chart, the album peaked at No. 54. In the USA, the album charted on two different charts, on Billboard's Top LP's the album peaked at No. 21, during a thirty seven-week run on the chart, and on the Cashbox Top 100 Albums it peaked at No. 30, during a twenty eight-week run on the chart.

== Track listing ==
Side one
No.	Title	Writer(s)	Length
1.	"Lucky in the Morning"	John Nitzinger	5:48
2.	"Cheater"	Bloodrock	6:52
3.	"Sable and Pearl"	Nitzinger	4:58
4.	"Fallin'"	Bloodrock	4:06

Side two
No.	Title	Writer(s)	Length
1.	"Children's Heritage"	Nitzinger	3:34
2.	"Dier Not a Lover"	Lee Pickens, Stevie Hill, Sam Gummelt	4:10
3.	"D.O.A."	Bloodrock	8:30
4.	"Fancy Space Odyssey"	Nitzinger	5:11
Total length:			43:08

== Personnel ==
Bloodrock

- Jim Rutledge – lead vocals
- Lee Pickens – lead guitar
- Nick Taylor – rhythm guitar, vocals
- Eddie Grundy — bass, vocals
- Stevie Hill – keyboards, vocals
- Rick Cobb – drums

Additional personnel

- Kenneth Hamann – engineering
- Terry Knight – production

== Charts ==
Chart (1970–71)	Peak position
Canada Top Albums/CDs (RPM)	54
US Billboard 200	21
US Cashox Top 100 Albums	30

== Certifications ==
Region	Certification	Certified units/sales
United States (RIAA)	Gold	500,000^{^}
^{^} Shipments figures based on certification alone.
