= Bloodrock (album) =

Studio album by Bloodrock
- Released: February 1970
- Recorded: 1969
- Genres: Hard rock; heavy metal
- Length: 48:10
- Label: Capitol
- Producer: Terry Knight

Bloodrock chronology
Bloodrock (1970)	Bloodrock 2 (1970)

Singles from Bloodrock
- 1. "Gotta Find a Way" Released: February 1970

Bloodrock is the debut album by the Texas rock band Bloodrock, released in February 1970 through Capitol Records. The cover art was designed by producer Terry Knight.

== Critical reception ==
Professional ratings
Review scores
Source	Rating
AllMusic	3/5 stars
Billboard	Positive
Melody Maker	Negative
The Rolling Stone Record Guide	0/5 stars

AllMusic described the album in terms of hard rock and early "proto-metal", akin to Deep Purple. The group's similarities to Grand Funk Railroad in overall sound and singing style led critics to understand Knight’s interest in the band. The album "remains a cult favorite among fans of hard rock."

The Rolling Stone Record Guide awarded zero stars out of five to all of the band's albums.

== Track listing ==
Side one
No.	Title	Writer(s)	Length
1.	"Gotta Find a Way"	Bloodrock	6:34
2.	"Castle of Thoughts"	Rutledge, Pickens	3:31
3.	"Fatback"	Rutledge, Grundy	3:24
4.	"Double Cross"	John Nitzinger	5:19
5.	"Timepiece"	Robert Louis O'Neill, Hal Ames	6:00

Side two
No.	Title	Writer(s)	Length
1.	"Wicked Truth"	Nitzinger	4:48
2.	"Gimme Your Head"	Grundy	2:44
3.	"Fantastic Piece of Architecture"	Rutledge, Hill	8:49
4.	"Melvin Laid an Egg"	Nitzinger	7:27
Total length:			48:10

== Personnel ==
- Jim Rutledge – drums, lead vocals
- Lee Pickens – lead guitar, vocals
- Nick Taylor – guitar, vocals
- Ed Grundy – bass, vocals
- Stephen Hill – keyboards, vocals

== Charts ==
Chart (1970)	Peak position
US Billboard 200	160
