= Bloodrock 3 =

Studio album by Bloodrock
- Released: 1971
- Recorded: January 1971
- Genre: Hard rock
- Label: Capitol
- Producer: Terry Knight

Bloodrock chronology
Bloodrock 2 (1970)	Bloodrock 3 (1971)	Bloodrock U.S.A. (1971)

Singles from Bloodrock 3
- 1. "Jessica" Released: May 1971; 2. "A Certain Kind" Released: August 1971

Bloodrock 3 is the third album by the Texan rock band Bloodrock, released in 1971 through Capitol Records.

The album debuted at No. 76 on the Billboard 200. It eventually achieved a Gold record certification.

== Album cover ==
The album cover was designed by the band's producer, Terry Knight.

== Critical reception ==
Professional ratings
Review scores
Source	Rating
Record World	no rating
Cashbox	no rating
Billboard	no rating
AllMusic	2.5/5 stars
The Encyclopedia of Popular Music	2/5 stars
The New Rolling Stone Record Guide	0/5 stars

AllMusic wrote that "Bloodrock 3 is an effective hard rock album that boasts tight arrangements and a spirited performance by the band."

== Track listing ==
No.	Title	Writer(s)	Length
1.	"Jessica"	John Nitzinger	4:40
2.	"Whiskey Vengeance"	Ed Grundy, Jim Rutledge, Rick Cobb, Steve Hill	4:12
3.	"Song for a Brother"	Hill	5:15
4.	"You Gotta Roll"	Rutledge, Nitzinger, Hill	5:05
5.	"Breach of Lease"	Grundy, Rutledge, Nitzinger, Cobb, Hill	9:05
6.	"Kool-Aid Kids"	Nitzinger	6:12
7.	"A Certain Kind"	Hugh Hopper	4:12
8.	"America, America"	Grundy, Cobb	1:20

== Notes ==
- The song "A Certain Kind" was originally performed by Soft Machine.
- Both of the singles have the same B-side “You Gotta Roll”.

== Personnel ==
- Rick Cobb: Drums, Percussion, Vocals
- Ed Grundy: Bass, Vocals
- Stephen Hill: Keyboards, Vocals
- Lee Pickens: Guitar, Vocals
- Jim Rutledge: Vocals
- Nick Taylor: Rhythm guitar, Vocals

== Charts ==
Chart (1971)	Peak position
Canada Top Albums/CDs (RPM)	45
US Billboard 200	27
