= Bloodrock =

American rock band

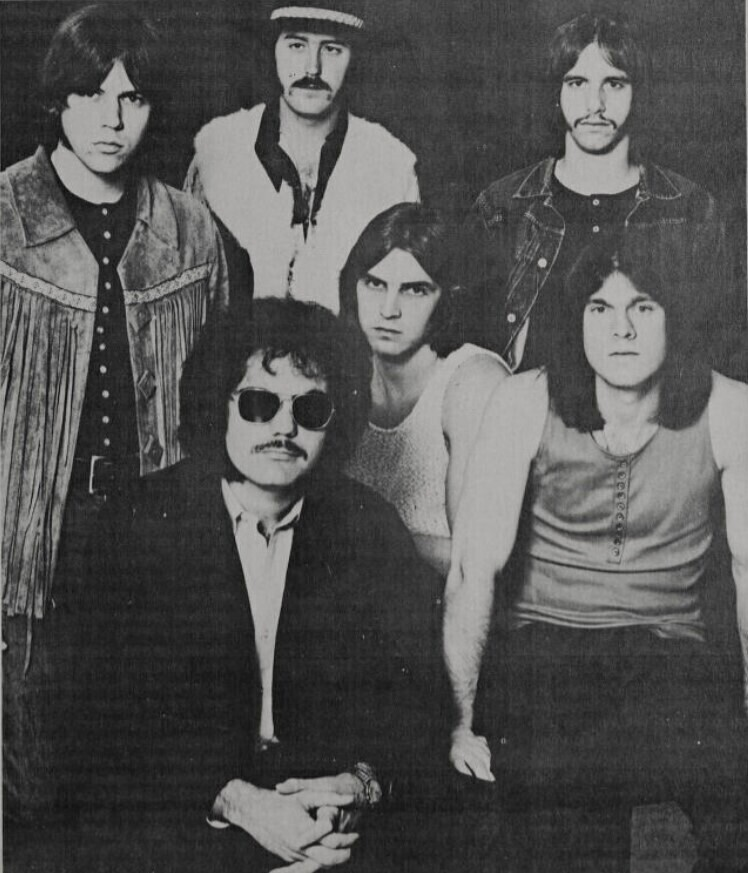
- Bloodrock in 1970. Clockwise from top: Lee Pickens, Stevie Hill, Rick Cobb, Ed Grundy, Nick Taylor, and Jim Rutledge.

Background information
- Also known as: The Naturals (1963–1966); Crowd +1 (1966–1969)
- Origin: Fort Worth, Texas, United States
- Genres: Hard rock; heavy metal; blues rock; progressive rock
- Years active: 1963–1975, 2005
- Label: Capitol
- Past members: Nick Taylor; Ed Grundy; Jim Rutledge; Dean Parks; Lee Pickens; Stevie Hill; Rick Cobb; Warren Ham; Randy Reader; Chris Taylor

Bloodrock was an American rock band based in Fort Worth, Texas, that had some success in the 1970s. The band emerged from the Fort Worth club and music scene during the early to mid-1970s. The band broke out with their eponymously titled album in 1970, which reached No. 160 in the US. They continued to release albums and singles until their breakup in 1974, in total having six studio albums, 2 live albums and 8 singles, one of which charted.

== History ==
=== The Naturals, Crowd + 1 (1963-1969) ===
Bloodrock initially formed in Fort Worth in 1963, under the name the Naturals. This first lineup featured Jim Rutledge on drums and vocals, Nick Taylor on guitar and vocals, Ed Grundy on bass and vocals, and Dean Parks on guitar. They toured the region playing at battle of the bands, opened locally for national acts like The Beach Boys, Paul Revere & The Raiders, and The Five Americans, and released their first single in 1965 "Hey Girl" b/w "I Want You" (Rebel MME 1003). In 1966, they changed their name to Crowd + 1, and released the single: "Mary Ann Regrets” b/w "Whatcha Tryin’ to Do to Me" (BOX 6604), that same year they signed a deal with Capitol Records and released two more singles: "Don’t Hold Back" b/w "Try," and "Circles" b/w “Most Peculiar Things."

Despite a growing regional fanbase, the singles failed to chart and Capitol dropped the group, not long after Parks left Crowd +1 to become the musical director for The Sonny & Cher Show. He was replaced by Lee Pickens on guitar. It was also at this time that Stevie Hill joined the group on keyboards and vocals.

They continued as Crowd + 1 until 1969 when they changed their name to Bloodrock, a name conceived by Grand Funk Railroad manager/producer Terry Knight, who signed the band to Capitol almost within two weeks of hearing them. They also recorded their first album with Knight as producer, Bloodrock (Capitol ST-435). The album, released in March 1970, peaked at 160 on the Billboard 200 chart.

Shortly after the first album was recorded, Rutledge (at Knight's behest) moved from behind the drum set to take on lead vocal duties exclusively. Austin-area drummer Rick Cobb took over the percussive duties and added his voice to the group as well. This lineup recorded their next four albums: Bloodrock 2 (ST-491), Bloodrock 3 (ST-765), Bloodrock USA (SMAS 645), and Bloodrock Live (SVBB-11038).

Bloodrock opened for Grand Funk on their 1970 tour.

=== Bloodrock 2 and "D.O.A." (1970-1971) ===
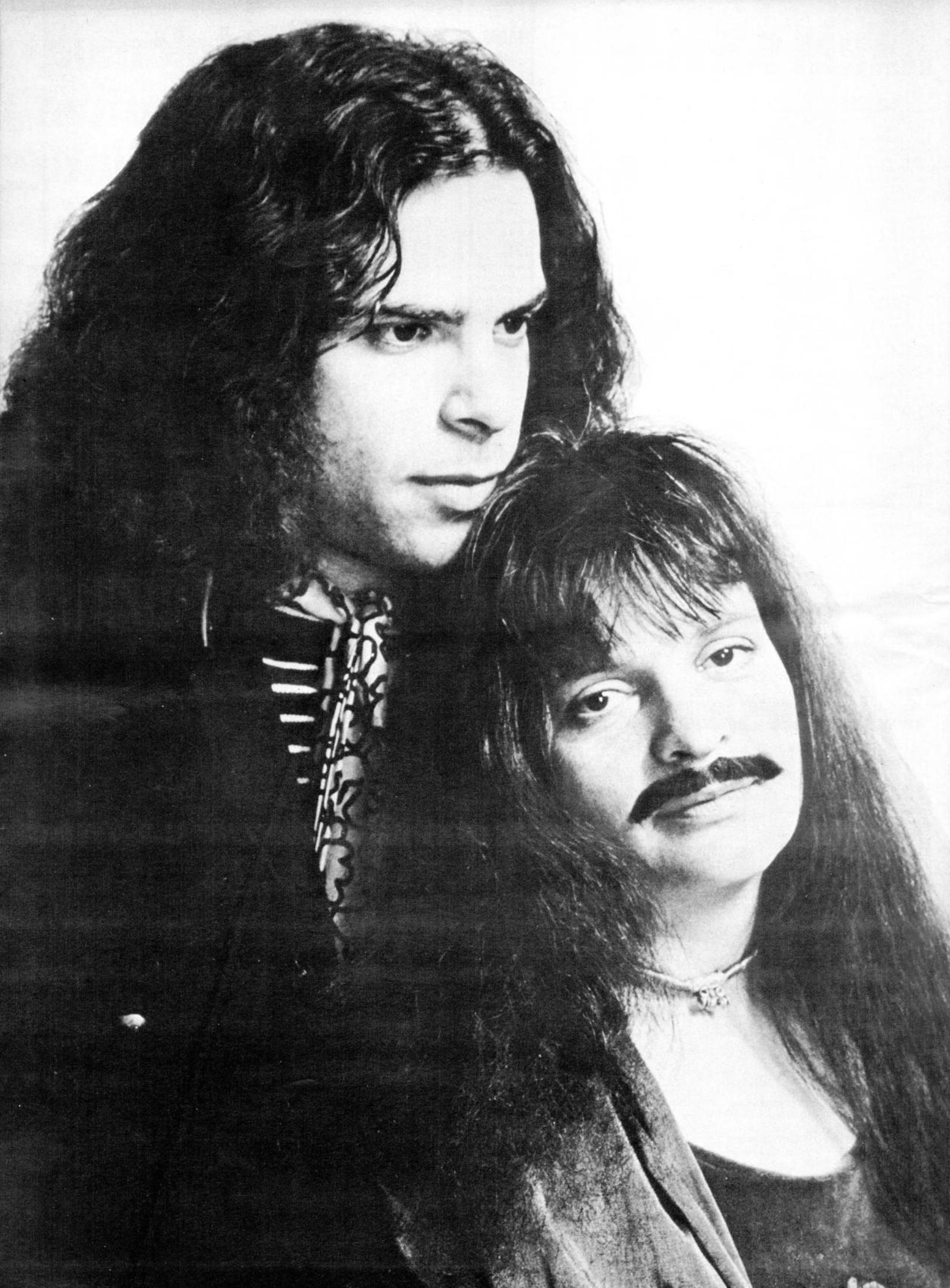
Taylor and Grundy in 1971

Bloodrock 2 was their most successful album peaking at number 21 on the Billboard Pop Album Chart in 1971, on the strength of their single "D.O.A.", which reached number 36 on the Billboard Hot 100 chart on March 6, 1971. "D.O.A." also gave the band considerable regional exposure throughout the Southwest and West, particularly in Texas and Southern California. "D.O.A." was the band's most well-known and well-remembered single. However, some radio stations would not play the song because of its explicit, gruesome description of fatal plane crash injury and the use of sirens, the latter out of concerns that the siren sound would confuse motorists. The motivation for writing this song was explained in 2005 by guitarist Lee Pickens. “When I was 17, I wanted to be an airline pilot,” Pickens said. “I had just gotten out of this airplane with a friend of mine, at this little airport, and I watched him take off. He went about 200 feet in the air, rolled and crashed.” The band decided to write a song around the incident and include it on their second album.

=== Style and personnel change (1972-1973) ===
In May 1972, both Lee Pickens and Jim Rutledge left Bloodrock, with Pickens forming the Lee Pickens Group (LPG). Bloodrock replaced Rutledge on vocals and Pickens on guitar with Warren Ham on vocals, flute and saxophone. Stevie Hill on keyboards adjusted to Ham's presence by shifting his own style. These changes to personnel and style moved the hard rock sound of the band in a lighter direction, more toward progressive rock, pop and jazz, alienating some fans. The subsequent album, Passage was the last time Bloodrock visited the charts. It peaked at number 104 on the Billboard 200 in 1972.

1973 brought another personnel change: Rick Cobb left the band, he was replaced by Randy Reader. This lineup recorded one album: Whirlwind Tongues (1974).

=== Unspoken Words, Break-Up (1974-1976) ===
Nick Taylor quit the group, and was replaced by Warren's brother, Bill Ham, while Randy Reader was replaced by Matt Betton. An album, later titled Unspoken Words, was recorded, but Capitol rejected the material due to the group’s waning popularity, and the recordings would go unreleased until 2000 when they were included as part of the CD release Triptych (along with cuts from Passage and Whirlwind Tongues).

The band broke up not long after they were dropped by Capitol, performing their last gig on April 14, 1974 in Flint, Michigan.

After the breakup, Rutledge, Pickens, and Taylor hired a rhythm section and briefly formed a Bloodrock spinoff group, performing in small clubs for about a year.

In 1976, Capitol issued a greatest hits album, Bloodrock N Roll, which featured tracks from the first three albums and the live set.

Around the same time, the original lineup temporarily put their differences aside and attempted a comeback. Initially led by Rutledge, the group lasted long enough to record some demos, including a cover of Heartbreak Hotel. Rutledge eventually dropped out, and was replaced by Rusty Robertson, a friend of Pickens, but due to lack of label interest and the departure of Cobb, the band called it quits.

=== 2005 reunion concert ===
A reunion concert featuring all five members of the original lineup (Jim Rutledge, Lee Pickens, Ed Grundy, Nick Taylor, and Stevie Hill), plus Chris Taylor (Nick's son) in place of drummer Rick Cobb III from the classic six-member lineup, was held on March 12, 2005, in Fort Worth, for the benefit of their keyboardist Stevie Hill, to help with medical costs related to his combating leukemia. The reunion concert was filmed and released on DVD.

Nick Taylor (born Doyle Taylor in Texas on October 29, 1946) died on March 10, 2010, after a car accident in Cleburne, Texas, at age 63.

Stevie Hill died on September 12, 2013, from leukemia.

== Music ==
Bloodrock's music has been categorized primarily as hard rock. Bloodrock's 1970 self-titled debut album was described in the context of hard rock and early heavy metal by AllMusic's Donald A. Guarisco. Bloodrock 2 was not as gloomy (except for "D.O.A.") and heavy, and more of a chart success, while Bloodrock 3 and Bloodrock U.S.A. saw the band introduce progressive rock elements. The 1972 personnel changes shifted the band toward prog rock, jazz and pop music.

== Members ==
=== Classic lineup ===
- Jim Rutledge — drums (1962–1970), lead vocals (1962–1972, 1974–1975, 2005)
- Lee Pickens — lead guitar (1968–1972, 1974–1976, 2005), backing vocals (1969)
- Nick Taylor — rhythm guitar (1962–1974, 1974–1976, 2005; died 2010), lead guitar (1972–1974), lead vocals (1965–1968), backing vocals (1969–1973, 1974–1976, 2005)
- Stevie Hill — keyboards (1968–1974, 2005; died 2013), backing vocals (1969–1973, 2005)
- Ed Grundy — bass guitar (1962–1974, 2005), lead vocals (1965–1968), backing vocals (1969–1973, 2005)
- Rick Cobb — drums, percussion (1970–1973, 1975–1976)

=== Former members ===
- Dean Parks — lead guitar (1962–1968)
- Warren Ham — lead vocals, saxophone, harmonica, flute (1972–1974)
- Randy Reeder — drums, percussion (1973)
- Bill Ham — guitar (1974)
- Matt Betton — drums (1974)
- Rusty Robertson — lead vocals (1976)
- Chris Taylor — drums (2005)

== Discography ==
=== Studio albums ===
Year	Title	Details	Peak chart positions		Certification
Year	Title	Details	US BB	US CB	Certification
1970	Bloodrock	Released: March 1970; Label: Capitol, One Way (reissue); Formats: LP, 8-track, cassette, CD (reissue)	160	—	
1970	Bloodrock 2	Released: October 1970; Label: Capitol, One Way (reissue); Formats: LP, 8-track, cassette, CD (reissue)	21	30	RIAA Gold
1971	Bloodrock 3	Released: April 1971; Label: Capitol, One Way (reissue); Formats: LP, 8-track, cassette, CD (reissue)	27	23	
1971	Bloodrock U.S.A.	Released: October 1971; Label: Capitol, One Way (reissue); Formats: LP, 8-track, cassette, CD (reissue)	88	92	
1972	Passage	Released: November 1972; Label: Capitol; Formats: LP, 8-track, cassette	105	72	
1974	Whirlwind Tongues	Released: February 1974; Label: Capitol; Formats: LP, 8-track	—	—	

=== Live albums ===
Title	Details	Peak chart positions	
Title	Details	US BB	US CB
Bloodrock Live	Released: May 1972; Label: Capitol, One Way (reissue); 2×LP, double-play cassette, double-play 8 track, CD (reissue)	67	49
The Bloodrock Reunion Concert	Released: 2007; Label: Self-released; Format: CD, DVD (self-released)	—	—

=== Compilations ===
Title	Details	Remark
Hit Road	Released: 1972; Label: Music for Pleasure (Germany), Sounds Superb (Netherlands); Format: LP	European compilation
Bloodrock 'n' Roll	Released: 1976; Label: Capitol; Formats: LP, CD, 8 track tape & cassette tape (1989 reissue)	U.S. compilation
D.O.A.	Released: 1989; Label: Capitol; Format: Cassette	Budget U.S. compilation
Triptych	Released: 2000; Label: One Way; Format: 2×CD	Passage, Whirlwind Tongues and Unspoken Words

=== Singles ===
Year	Title	Format	Label	Catalog no.	From album	Peak chart position (US)
1970	"Gotta Find a Way" b/w "Fatback"	7" single	Capitol	ST 2736	Bloodrock	—
1971	"D.O.A." b/w "Children's Heritage"	7" single	Capitol	ST 3009	Bloodrock 2	36
1971	"A Certain Kind" b/w "You Gotta Roll"	7" single	Capitol	ST 3089	Bloodrock 3	—
1971	"Jessica" b/w "You Gotta Roll"	7" single	Capitol	ST 3161	Bloodrock 3	129 (RW)
1971	"Rock & Roll Candy Man" b/w "Don't Eat the Children"	7" single	Capitol	ST 3227	Bloodrock U.S.A.	—
1972	"Erosion" b/w "Castle of Thoughts"	7" single	Capitol	ST 3320	Non-album single	—
1972	"Help Is on the Way" b/w "Thank You Daniel Ellsberg"	7" single	Capitol	ST 3451	Passage	—
1973	"Thank You Daniel Ellsberg" b/w "Voices"	7" single	Capitol	ST 3770	Passage	—

=== Other releases ===
- Unspoken Words (2000) (as part of the Triptych compilation)
- Bloodrock 2013 (2013) (by Jim Rutledge & John Nitzinger)
