= Lucky Eleven Records =

Independent record label

- Founded: 1959
- Country of origin: United States

Lucky Eleven Records was a record label started in 1959 in Flint, Michigan by Otis Ellis and Chuck Slaughter. The independent label later became distributed by Philadelphia-based Cameo-Parkway Records which featured the Flint-based pop band Terry Knight and the Pack. The Lucky Eleven and Cameo-Parkway recordings are now owned by ABKCO Records..a re-issue label which includes the re-release of Cameo-Parkway product.

== See also ==
- List of record labels
