= Terry Knight =

American DJ, singer-songwriter, and music producer (1943–2004)

- Born: Richard Terrance Knapp; April 9, 1943; Lapeer, Michigan, United States
- Died: November 1, 2004 (aged 61) Temple, Texas, United States
- Genres: Rock, pop
- Occupations: Singer, songwriter, talent manager, promoter, radio personality
- Years active: 1963–1973
- Labels: Capitol Records, Lucky Eleven
- Formerly of: Terry Knight and the Pack, Grand Funk Railroad, ? and the Mysterians, Bloodrock

Terry Knight (born Richard Terrance Knapp; April 9, 1943 – November 1, 2004) was an American rock and roll music producer, promoter, singer, songwriter and radio personality, who enjoyed some success in radio, modest success as a singer, but considerable success as the original manager-producer for Grand Funk Railroad and the producer for Bloodrock.

== Early career ==
Knight was born in Lapeer, Michigan, United States. As a youth, he was captivated by the early sounds of rock and roll radio, especially the personality DJs like Dick Biondi, whose powerful signal from WLS in Chicago was easily picked up nightly on his radio in Lapeer. Young Terry set his sights on becoming a DJ and began to practice his radio patter at home on his own tiny reel-to-reel tape recorder. After graduating from high school in 1961, he briefly attended Alma College before dropping out. Knight's music career began as a DJ at the Top 40 rock station WTAC in Flint, Michigan, then going to Detroit in 1963 where he replaced Dave Shafer as "Jack the Bellboy" on WJBK. The following year, he moved across the river to CKLW in Windsor, Ontario. One of the first American DJs to air the Rolling Stones, he hosted a late night show from high-powered CKLW, bringing the British Invasion to the Northern states. He famously managed to get away with playing the Rolling Stones' "Little Red Rooster" over and over for an hour. He was awarded the honorary title of "The Sixth Stone" for his early support of the Stones. By the end of 1964, however, Knight had left CKLW and the radio business, intending to pursue his own career in music. One account has it that he gave his reason for leaving as planning to move to England to become the sixth Rolling Stone.

Around 1965, Knight fashioned a songwriting and performing career in Flint by becoming the front man for Terry Knight and the Pack. The Jazz Masters — with Farner, Brewer, and three other musicians — became the Pack, who backed Knight on his debut 1965 single, "Tears Come Rollin'." With this band, Knight recorded a handful of regional hits for Lucky Eleven Records, part of the Cameo-Parkway Records group, including his self-penned generation gap anthem "A Change On the Way", and scored two national hits, a cover of the Yardbirds' "(You're a) Better Man Than I", and his ultra-lounge reading of Ben E. King's "I (Who Have Nothing)", which peaked at No. 46 nationally. Terry Knight and the Pack were very popular locally and opened for both the Rolling Stones and the Yardbirds when those bands toured in Michigan. The band left three garage rock classics before breaking up in 1967. Brownsville Station honored Knight and the Pack with a cover of the Knight-penned "Love, Love, Love, Love, Love" on their 1973 album Yeah! Terry Knight and the Pack were voted into the Michigan Rock and Roll Legends Hall of Fame in 2008.

== Producer and solo career ==
In 1967 Knight moved to New York City, and attempted a solo career as a singer and staff producer with the Cameo-Parkway label, with limited success. He produced and wrote a handful of tracks by other artists, including garage band Question Mark & the Mysterians, and the easy-listening International Pop Orchestra. He also scored music for the 20th Century Fox noir film, The Incident (1967).

Knight traveled to London in 1968, hoping to become a recording artist or producer for the Beatles' newly formed Apple Records. Knight met Paul McCartney and was present at some of the recording sessions for the band's 1968 double album The Beatles (also known as the "White Album"), including the session when Ringo Starr temporarily quit the group. Knight was surprised to find the band members arguing with each other. He soon left London after he was unable to negotiate a contract with acceptable terms.

== "Saint Paul" ==
In early 1969, Knight secured a producer's contract with Capitol Records which also allowed him to release his own songs as a solo artist. He wrote and recorded a single, "Saint Paul", which may have contributed to the "Paul is dead" conspiracy theory that erupted late in the year. The cryptic lyrics of the song are generally thought to allude to Knight's failed relationship with McCartney and his apparent belief that the Beatles would soon break up. The lyrics do not refer to death, but were interpreted by some fans as containing clues. The ending repeats the phrase "hey Paul" in an arrangement that sounds similar to the Beatles' song "Hey Jude". There are two versions, both in stereo. The full five-minute version contains a high-pitched voice singing lines from Beatles songs, including "Hello, Goodbye", "Lucy in the Sky with Diamonds" and "She Loves You", while the four-minute edit does not contain additional song excerpts.

Initial copies of the single listed Knight's company Storybook Music as the publisher of "Saint Paul". After Capitol received a cease and desist letter from the Beatles' music publisher, Maclen Music (the U.S. division of Northern Songs), the record was pulled from distribution.

A deal was then worked out between Knight and Maclen Music. About a month later, in May 1969, "Saint Paul" was reissued with a publishing credit by Maclen. The second pressing of the record also contained a note on the label that stated that "Hey Jude" was "used by permission". The reassignment of the publishing rights made Knights' song the only non Lennon–McCartney tune owned by Maclen. "Saint Paul" reached the top 40 in some cities in the upper Midwest region but failed to make the Billboard Hot 100 national chart, making in to #114 in the "Bubbling Under" charts. The fact that "Saint Paul" was re-published by Maclen was seen by some Beatle fans as evidence of a conspiracy involving Knight, the Beatles and the "Paul is dead" rumor.

"Saint Paul" was re-recorded in 1969 by New Zealand singer Shane and became one of the best-selling singles of the 1960s in that country. In the early 1990s author Andru Reeve repeatedly tried to interview Knight while writing a book about the "Paul is dead" urban legend. Reeve was unable to get Knight to talk about the song.

== Grand Funk Railroad ==
Still working as a producer with Capitol, Knight renewed his connection with two former Pack members, guitarist Mark Farner and drummer Don Brewer. Knight encouraged the two to add a new bass player and become a "power trio" along the lines of Cream. The group quickly added former ? and the Mysterians bassist Mel Schacher and changed their name to 'Grand Funk Railroad'. Knight named the band originally "Grand Trunk Railroad" as a play on words for the Grand Trunk Western Railroad, a well-known rail line in Michigan, but the railroad objected to using their name, and the band was forced to change the name to Grand Funk Railroad.

While becoming their manager-producer, Knight helped steer the trio to international fame, beginning with his getting them onto the bill—for free—at the 1969 Atlanta Pop Festival. This live performance convinced Capitol to sign the trio. For the next two years, Grand Funk Railroad became the most popular rock attraction in the United States despite mixed critical reviews that Knight exploited as part of their appeal. As he himself explained: "If the critics said Grand Funk was bad, I knew the kids would go for them. That was the Grand Funk marketing strategy: Distrust the media." Knight's marketing savvy was instrumental to the band's explosive rise. The band spent $100,000 on a New York City Times Square billboard to advertise Closer to Home. By 1971, Grand Funk equaled the Beatles' Shea Stadium attendance record but sold out the venue in just 72 hours, whereas the Beatles concert took a few weeks to sell out. He also discovered and produced the Fort Worth, Texas group Bloodrock, who hit the Top 40 in early 1971 with the unlikely death anthem "D.O.A. (Dead On Arrival)".

Between Grand Funk and Bloodrock, Knight racked up an unprecedented eight gold albums while simultaneously waging a war of words with Rolling Stone over the magazine's frequent pannings of the two acts. But by early 1972, both Grand Funk and Bloodrock had severed their professional relations with Knight. The band wasn't signed to Capitol Records directly but to Knight himself, who served as the go-between for artist and label. It wasn't really an issue at first, but by the time Grand Funk started to make some money, they noticed things were looking suspicious. In Grand Funk's case, it involved court actions that kept the band tied up for almost two full years; they had demanded full royalty accounting and accused Knight of double-dipping as manager-producer, while the trio had not been getting all the monies they had earned. In the spring of 1972, Grand Funk fired Knight, who in turn sued them for $57 million. In one of the most dramatic episodes in rock history, ex-manager Terry Knight took Grand Funk Railroad's equipment following a December 23, 1972 concert at Madison Square Garden. Eventually, an out-of-court settlement was reached. Grand Funk Railroad got to keep their name, but Knight got almost everything else — including the publishing rights to all of their songs up to that point. For his part, Knight would claim the band had had only three months left on their contract with him when they first took him to court, and could have been free with half the legal aggravation; the trio ultimately won their separation from Knight but at a heavy cost, before adding keyboard player Craig Frost and continuing a successful recording and touring career through 1976.

== Life after Grand Funk ==
Knight was also dropped from Capitol soon after the Grand Funk court actions were resolved and began his own label, Brown Bag Records, releasing albums and singles by Mom's Apple Pie, John Hambrick, Faith Band and most notably Wild Cherry, producing their initial demos and singles, though the band achieved their breakthrough hit "Play That Funky Music" in 1976 on Epic Records under self-production. None of them found commercial success and, in late 1973, Knight retired permanently from show business. He associated with super model Twiggy and raced cars with film star Paul Newman in the mid-1970s before becoming addicted to cocaine, which consumed him. By the 1980s he had straightened himself out, settling in Yuma, Arizona with his daughter Danielle. He melded into the community working in advertising sales for a weekly newspaper.

== Death ==
On November 1, 2004, Terry Knight was murdered at the age of 61. He was stabbed multiple times by his teenage daughter's boyfriend Donald A. Fair in their shared apartment in Temple, Texas, after Knight attempted to intercede in an argument over Fair's use of methamphetamine. Fair claimed he was high on methamphetamine at the time of the killing, in an attempt to mitigate his sentence. Fair was sentenced on May 26, 2005, to life in prison. Terry Knight was cremated and buried in a family plot in Lapeer, Michigan. He is survived by daughter, Danielle. Four years after his death, Terry Knight and The Pack were voted into the Michigan Rock and Roll Legends online Hall of Fame.

== Discography ==
=== Singles ===
- The Bossmen - Baby Boy/You And I (1966)
- The Debutantes - Love Is Strange/A New Love Today (1966)
- The Rites Of Spring - Why (?)/Comin' On Back To Me (1966)
- Dandy Dan - If Love Is/(I Don't Stand) A Ghost Of A Chance (1967)
- The Jayhawkers - Come On (Children)/A Certain Girl (1967)
- Sir Cedric Smith - Until It's Time For You To Go/To Sing For You (1967)
- Barry Drake - Roll On River (1971)
- Barry Drake - I Won't Be Reconstructed (1971)

=== Albums ===
- Terry Knight & The Pack - Terry Knight and the Pack (1966)
- Terry Knight & The Pack - Reflections (1967)
- Grand Funk Railroad - On Time (1969)
- Grand Funk Railroad - Grand Funk (1969)
- Bloodrock - Bloodrock (1970)
- Grand Funk Railroad - Closer to Home (1970)
- Bloodrock - Bloodrock 2 (1970)
- Grand Funk Railroad - Live Album (1970)
- Grand Funk Railroad - Survival (1971)
- Bloodrock - Bloodrock 3 (1971)
- Grand Funk Railroad - E Pluribus Funk (1971)
- John Hambrick - Windmill In A Jet Filled Sky (1972)
