= Fales Library =

New York University archive and manuscript collection

Coordinates: 40°43′47″N 73°59′49″W

New York University's Fales Library and Special Collections is located on the third floor of the Elmer Holmes Bobst Library on the university's Washington Square Park campus. It houses nearly 200,000 volumes, and 10,000 feet (3,000 m) of archive and manuscript materials, including the Fales Collection of Rare Books and manuscripts in English and American literature, the Downtown Collection, the Food and Cookery Collection, and the general Special Collections from the NYU Libraries.

== Collections ==
The Fales Collection was given to NYU in 1957 by DeCoursey Fales in memory of his father, Haliburton Fales. It is especially strong in English literature from the middle of the 18th century to the present, documenting developments in the novel. Other related collections held in Fales include The Berol Collection of Lewis Carroll Materials, the Robert Frost Library, the Nelson F. Adkins collection of American Literature, and the manuscript collections of Elizabeth Robins, Peter Straub, E. L. Doctorow and Erich Maria Remarque. An area of recent growth in Fales is the Food and Cookery Collection of well over 15,000 books. The personal libraries of James Beard, Cecily Brownstone, and Dalia Carmel form the core of this collection

The Downtown Collection documents the downtown New York city art, performance, film, and literary landscape from 1975 to the present. In addition to thousands of published books and magazines, the Downtown Collection includes extensive holdings of archival and manuscript material, film and video, original artwork, theatrical models, and other realia. Archival holdings range from the personal papers of writers such as Dennis Cooper, David Wojnarowicz, Richard Foreman and Lynne Tillman to the papers of publishing ventures such as High Risk Books and Between C & D to the archives of organizations such as Creative Time and Mabou Mines and the Gonightclubbing.

The Fales Library preserves manuscripts and original editions of books that are rare or important not only because of their texts, but also because of their value as artifacts. The Downtown Collection archive is rich in late 1970s and 1980s punk rock and no wave post-punk videos, drawings, films, photos, interviews, posters, correspondences and other ephemera.

=== Tracey-Barry Gallery ===
The Tracey-Barry Gallery offers public exhibits of materials from the Library's collections.

=== Personal archives ===
The Fales Library holds the personal papers and/or archives of the following, among others:

- Robert Blanchon
- John Canemaker
- Mary Ellen Carroll
- Jerome Charyn
- Dennis Cooper
- E. L. Doctorow
- Mary Beth Edelson
- Richard Foreman
- Riot Grrrl
- Robert Hammond
- Kathleen Hanna
- Mary Harron
- Sarah Jacobson
- Group Material
- Joseph Nechvatal
- April Palmieri
- Elizabeth Robins
- Peter Straub
- Lynne Tillman
- David Wojnarowicz
