= Orchestra Luna =

American rock and roll band

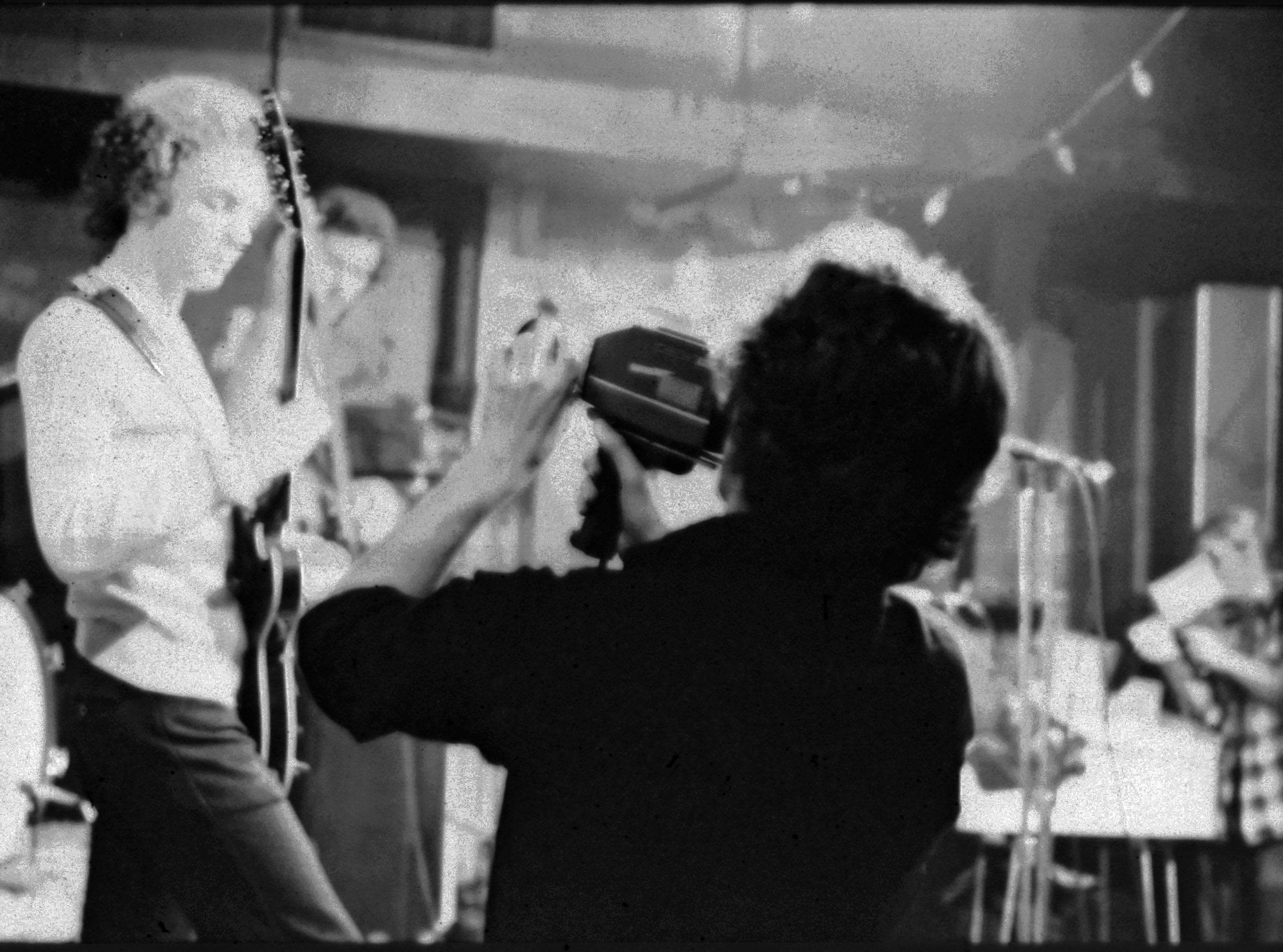
- Orchestra Luna at CBGB's in 1975 being filmed by Pat Ivers of Metropolis Video

Background information
- Origin: Boston, Massachusetts, U.S.A.
- Genres: Rock and roll
- Years active: 1974 to 1978

Orchestra Luna was an American rock and roll band of the 1970s who had two incarnations, the first producing a hard-to-categorize mixture of cabaret, Broadway musicals, and rock, and the second a somewhat more traditional mix of pop and rock. Rick Berlin, at the time using his birth name of Richard Kinscherf, composed most of their songs, sang, and played keyboards. Rick was the driving force of the band and is the only person who was a member in all the various lineups.

On their debut album Orchestra Luna, the band consisted of:

- Richard Kinscherf - Keyboards, Vocals
- Lisa Kinscherf - Vocals
- Liz Gallagher - Vocals
- Scott Chambers - Bass, Vocals
- Randy Roos - Guitars
- Don Mulvaney - Drums, Percussion, Vocals
- Peter Barrett - Narration, Vocals

The second major version of the band included:

- Richard Kinscherf - Keyboards, Vocals
- Liz Gallagher - Vocals
- Peter Barrett - Vocals
- Karla DeVito - Vocals
- Steven Paul Perry - Guitar
- Chet Cahill - Bass
- Bob Brandon - Keyboards
- Ace Holleran - Drums (August, 1976 to May 1977)
- Erik Engstrom - Drums (May, 1977 through early 1978)
- Joe Petruzzelli - Drums (early 1978 to the end)

== Luna (band) ==
Luna
- Origin: Boston, Massachusetts, U.S.A.
- Genres: Rock and Roll
- Years active: 1978 to 1980

After Orchestra Luna, some of its former members formed the band Luna as a new American rock and roll band. It was spearheaded by Rick Berlin from Orchestra Luna. In 1977, the band released the single "Hollywood" with B-side as "Dumb Love". Band members were:

- Rick Berlin - Keyboards, Vocals
- Steven Paul Perry - Guitar
- Chet Cahill - Bass
- Bob Brandon - Keyboards
- Joe Petruzzelli - Drums

It disbanded after two years.

== Discography ==
Orchestra Luna

Studio album by Orchestra Luna
- Released: 1974
- Recorded: July and August, 1974
- Genre: pop
- Length: 45:44
- Label: Epic
- Producers: Jeffrey Lesser and Rupert Holmes

Professional ratings
Review scores
Source	Rating
Allmusic	link
Gnosis.net	link

Orchestra Luna is the eponymous debut album by the American rock group Orchestra Luna. It was released in 1974 by Epic Records. The first incarnation of Orchestra Luna produced music often called a mixture of cabaret, Broadway musical, and rock, and that is clearly evident on this album. Composer/singer/pianist Rick Berlin is listed on the album under his birthname Richard Kinscherf. Kinscherf relates the story of his band in the booklet accompanying the 2007 CD reissue of the album by Market Square Records.

=== Track listing ===
All songs by Richard Kinscherf, except where noted.

1. "Were You Dancin' on Paper" (F. Reitano) – 3:34
2. "Miss Pamela" – 3:17
3. "Little Sam" – 3:12
4. "Heart" (Richard Adler, Jerry Ross) – 5:54
5. "Love Is Not Enough" – 6:25
6. "Boy Scouts" – 2:24
7. "Fay Wray" – 4:18
8. "But One" – 3:02
9. "Doris Dreams" – 11:53

=== Credits ===
- Richard Kinscherf – Keyboards, vocals
- Lisa Kinscherf – Vocals
- Liz Gallagher – Vocals
- Scott CHambers – Bass, Vocals
- Randy Roos – Guitars
- Don Mulvaney – drums, percussion, Vocals
- Peter Barrett – Narration, Vocals
