= DeCoursey =

DeCoursey is both a surname and a given name. Notable people with the name include:

Surname:

- James H. DeCoursey Jr. (1932-2016), American politician
- Jillian DeCoursey (born 1984), American mixed martial artist
- Patricia DeCoursey (1932–2022), American biologist
- Pete DeCoursey (1961–2014), American journalist

Given name:

- DeCoursey Fales (1888–1966), American bibliophile
