= Paul Dougherty (video editor) =

American video artist

Paul Dougherty, photographed by Cathe Neukum, October 21, 2012.

Paul Dougherty is an American video editor, media artist, and pioneer in independent video production. His work spans early public access television, network television news editing, and experimental remix and music video projects.

In the 1970s, Dougherty created independent video using state-of-the-art broadcast facilities that were rarely accessible to artists at the time, co-founding the Metropolis Video collective while documenting the nascent punk scene at CBGB, capturing video footage of Blondie, the Heartbreakers, Talking Heads and other bands early in their careers. In 1987, he won a Daytime Emmy Award for Outstanding Videotape Editing for Pee-wee's Playhouse. His videos are included in the permanent collection of the Museum of Modern Art (MoMA), and he played a key role in the early adoption and development of nonlinear editing technology in the 1990s.

Dougherty works document Manhattan's downtown music scene, Off-Off-Broadway performance, and the evolution of independent video and broadcast technology.
