= The Long Way Home (1989 film) =

- Directed by: Michael Apted
- Produced by: Steve Lawrence
- Starring: Boris Grebenshchikov; Aquarium; Dave Stewart
- Cinematography: Peter Gilbert; Christophe Lanzenberg; Clive Tickner (U.K.); Ralf D. Bode (Leningrad concerts)
- Edited by: Susanne Rostock
- Music by: Boris Grebenshchikov
- Production company: Yerosha Productions
- Distributed by: Granada TV; CBS Music Video Entertainment
- Release date: May 30, 1989 (United States)
- Running time: 82 minutes (original film), 97 minutes (remastered with new epilogue)
- Countries: United States; United Kingdom
- Languages: English; Russian
- Budget: $1.4 million

The Long Way Home is a feature documentary by Michael Apted about the odyssey of Soviet underground rock hero Boris Grebenshchikov to the West in 1988 to record an album for CBS Records and bring it back home in the early, optimistic days of Glasnost. It was financed by Granada TV and CBS Music Entertainment and finished in 1989.

CBS invested in the film to help support Boris's album, Radio Silence which they released in December 1989. Granada was home to Apted's Up films.

The Long Way Home was filmed between June and November,1988. It unfolds chronologically, beginning with Boris's first recording session in New York City with producer Dave Stewart, then continuing as Boris's band, Aquarium, arrives in Montreal, where they perform at the Concert for Peace with Crosby, Stills & Nash joining them for one song. After they record a track at Le Studio in Morin Heights, squabbling at times, the film shifts to Leningrad to explore Boris's family life, his relationship with his bandmates, and how Glasnost has triggered new energy and hope.

Leaving Aquarium behind, Boris resumes recording at Stewart's Church Studios in London, where Annie Lennox and Chrissie Hynde provide backing vocals and Ray Cooper adds percussion. After a break at a dacha outside Leningrad, where some of Boris's bandmates express skepticism about his new songs and wonder if he will abandon them, Boris hunkers down at Stewart's LA studio to finish recording and mixing. Despite the arrival of Aquarium bassist Sasha Titov, Boris struggles to get what he wants. Stewart wonders if Boris has been in America too long, summarizing his quandary in an impromptu song, “The Ballad of Boris". The film concludes in Leningrad in November, where Stewart and Eurythmics, minus Lennox, rehearse with Aquarium, overcoming language barriers and musical differences to perform two electrifying shows at the Leningrad Sports Complex.

== Background and development ==
Steve Lawrence began developing a documentary about Grebenshchikov and the making of his CBS album after filming him for his 1987 MTV documentary about Soviet underground rock called Tell Tchaikovsky The News: Rock in Russia. With support from Boris's US managers, Marina Albee and Ken Schaffer of Belka International, he and cinematographer Peter Gilbert filmed with Boris in New York City and LA during this first trip to America in December 1987, including Boris's first meeting with Dave Stewart. A demo reel was made from this material to support fundraising for the film.

In January 1988, British filmmaker and journalist Jo Durden-Smith met Grebenshchikov in Leningrad and subsequently proposed to Michael Apted that they make a documentary about Boris and his upcoming album project. Apted flew to Leningrad from the UK and met with Boris. He was eager to direct the film. After learning from Belka that Lawrence was already developing the same idea, he and Lawrence agreed to join forces, with Apted directing and Lawrence producing. Durden-Smith would act as co-producer.

== Release and distribution ==
The Long Way Home had its broadcast premiere on Granada TV (UK) on May 30, 1989. It had its US premiere at the Sundance United States Film Festival in January 1990. A VHS home video was released in the US in 1991 by New Video.

== Reception ==
In The Times (of London), critic Jasper Rees called The Long Way Home, “a masterly film". In The Independent, Mark Lawson wrote: “The fascination of the film was that Boris is a beneficiary and victim of glasnost". Hugh Hebert of The Guardian called it “an illuminating documentary about the role of rock in rehearsing the Soviet young for glasnost", and “What Apted’s film gives us is an acute sense of a generation of Russians at once freer than at any time for 60 years and yet tinged with uncertainty and obscure guilt".

Reviewing the film for MusicFilmWeb in 2011, Andy Markowitz wrote: “Apted largely backgrounds the geopolitical in favor a portrait of an artist uneasily straddling musical and cultural worlds, uncertain how closely to cling to his past as a previously unimaginable future opens up before him… The Long Way Home makes getting to know Grebenshikov such an interesting ride that one wishes that, at least for those of us in the West, it had lasted longer".

== Remastered and Expanded Version ==
A 4K remastered and expanded version of The Long Way Home had its world premiere on January 28, 2026 at the Museum of Modern Art in New York City as part of the museum's To Save And Project annual festival of film preservation. The digital remastering was supervised by Steven Lawrence and Susanne Rostock, the original film's producer and editor. They also co-directed the epilogue, which brings viewers up to date on Boris Grebenshchikov's journey, including his exile from Russia for speaking out against the invasion of Ukraine.
