= Rick Berlin =

American singer-songwriter

Rick Berlin (born Richard Gustave Kinscherf III; 1945 in Sioux City, Iowa) is a Boston-based singer-songwriter, formerly the frontman of Orchestra Luna, Luna, Berlin Airlift, Rick Berlin: The Movie, and The Shelley Winters Project.

== Life and career ==
A Yale graduate, Berlin has been writing and performing a distinctly theatrical form of rock and roll since the early 1970s. He achieved much of his early success with Orchestra Luna, whose eponymous debut was released on Epic Records in 1974. Orchestra Luna, co-produced by Rupert Holmes, captured many of the dramatic eccentricities that made the band a renowned live act, particularly on "(You Gotta Have) Heart" (a cover of the Damn Yankees tune). That year, WBCN started an annual tradition of playing this particular cut for the Boston Red Sox on the baseball team's opening day. Album sales proved disappointing to Epic, though the tour for the record was successful (including an opening slot for Roxy Music). The label dropped the band, but Berlin (then Kinscherf) continued to compose and perform with Orchestra Luna, becoming a part of the CBGB scene in New York City and playing with acts like Talking Heads and The Ramones. In 1976, Orchestra Luna was offered a recording contract from Sire Records, which they turned down. Unfortunately, they found themselves unable to find a better offer. In 1978, the band's name was changed to, simply, Luna. A hit single, "Hooray For Hollywood" was released, but litigation with a former producer prevented a full album from following.

In 1982 his new band, Berlin Airlift (named for the Allied mission to fly food and supplies to blockaded West Berlin in 1948–1949), released its eponymous debut on Handshake/CBS Records. The album was given little chance to succeed, however, as Handshake declared bankruptcy less than two months later. Nonetheless, two of the album's singles, "Don't Stop Me From Crying" and "Over The Hill" were hits on local Boston radio. In 1983, Berlin Airlift opened for the J. Geils Band and released the Professionally damaged EP. It featured "Hunger Strikes" which was the number one local song of 1983 on Boston radio station WBCN. The demise of Handshake Records and other difficulties led to the breakup of Berlin Airlift in 1984.

Rick Berlin: The Movie was formed in 1985. Berlin won Indie Songwriter of the Year at the Boston Music Awards for the single "Rock 'n Roll Romance" in 1987, and continued to perform in Rick Berlin: The Movie until 1989. He briefly fronted a band called Rome Is Burning in 1990, but by 1991 was performing as a solo artist. In 1994, Berlin began playing Monday nights at a Boston transvestite bar called Jacques. This weekly gig continued through 2003.

In 1999, Berlin formed one more band, The Shelley Winters Project. An eponymous, six-track CD was released on Orchard Records in 2001, followed in 2002 by the full-length I Hate Everything But You on Windjam Records. In 2003, The Shelley Winters Project opened for The B-52's, and in 2004 the band folded.

Berlin recently recorded as a solo artist, and released the album Me & Van Gogh in early 2006, and "Paper Airplane" in 2010, both on the Hi-n-Dry label. In 2009 he appeared on the Internationally streamed, On Stage with Mantis as a soloist featuring material from 'Me & Van Gogh' and the soon to be finished 'Paper Airplanes'. He was also employed at historic Doyle's Cafe in Jamaica Plain, Massachusetts until it closed October 2019.

Following the release of "Paper Airplane", Rick teamed up with the already existing Nickel & Dime Band. This 8-piece band breathes new life into old Berlin tunes. Berlin continues to write new material, now with this band in mind. The Nickel & Dime band (with Rick Berlin) recorded a live show at the Brendan Behan, titled "Outta Control" in March 2011, and they finished up their first studio pursuit at Dimension Sound, and are expecting to release it later this year. Though on a small scale, the band has received highly positive critical acclaim, partly thanks to Berlin's preexisting reputation in his hometown Jamaica Plain.

Berlin also worked in setting up the First Annual JP Music Fest, a tradition that he wants to continue for a long time. The one for 2012 is already in the works.

== Luna ==
Luna
- Origin: Boston, Massachusetts, US
- Genres: Rock and Roll
- Years active: 1978 to 1980
- Website: http://berlinrick.com

Luna was an American rock and roll band formed by Rick Berlin from former members of Orchestra Luna. Band members were:

- Rick Berlin – Keyboards, Vocals
- Steven Paul Perry – Guitar
- Chet Cahill – Bass
- Bob Brandon – Keyboards
- Joe Petruzzelli – Drums

=== Discography ===
==== Singles ====
- Hollywood b/w Dumb Love – (1977)

== Solo discography ==
- Live at Jacques – (2000)
- Me and Van Gogh – (2005)
- Old Stag – (2008)
- Paper Airplane – (2010)
