= Paul Dougherty =

Paul Dougherty may refer to:

- Paul Dougherty (footballer)
- Paul Dougherty (artist)
- Paul Dougherty (video editor)
