= Steven Lawrence (documentary filmmaker) =

American documentary filmmaker

Steven Lawrence (born 1953) is an American documentary filmmaker and television producer whose career spans public access television, early long-form music programming at MTV, international documentary production, and the co-founding of the satellite television network Link TV.

== Public access television and early media work (1970s) ==
In 1972, Lawrence was hired by Manhattan Cable Television to coordinate its newly established public access channels, which were mandated under Federal Communications Commission rules to enable community use of cable television. He later became Director of Community Production Services, developing original arts and political programming and establishing production workshops.

While at Manhattan Cable, Lawrence co-founded Metropolis Video, a production collective that recorded multi-camera performances by emerging punk and new wave artists at CBGB in 1975, including Talking Heads, Blondie, and Richard Hell and The Heartbreakers. Performances of the Talking Heads directed by Lawrence were later included on the band's official Chronology DVD release.

After leaving Manhattan Cable in 1978, Lawrence became programming director for the Center for Non-Broadcast Television at Automation House. There he developed and produced public affairs and arts programs, serving as co-executive producer, alongside Jaime Davidovich, of the inaugural Artists Television Network series, which was funded by the National Endowment for the Arts.

== MTV and long-form music programming (1981–1987) ==
Lawrence joined MTV in 1981 during the channel's launch period and later served as senior producer-director of long-form programming through 1987. He developed documentary programs designed to extend beyond the channel's short-form music-video format.

His work included the Liner Notes series, which profiled artists such as Run-DMC, Fela Kuti, and Rubén Blades, and the Addicted to Style series featuring Frank Zappa and children. He also directed the documentary special Artists United Against Apartheid: The Making of Sun City and Tell Tchaikovsky the News: Rock in Russia, a documentary focusing on underground Soviet rock musicians.

== Documentary filmmaking ==
=== Longitudinal documentaries and collaborations ===
As a producer, Lawrence collaborated with director Michael Apted on several documentary projects. These included The Long Way Home (1989), which followed the journey of underground Soviet rock musician Boris Grebenshchikov, and the longitudinal documentaries Married in America (2002) and Married in America 2 (2006), which tracked American couples who married in 2001. Lawrence also created the longitudinal documentary series Born in the USSR, producing its first installment, Age 7 in the USSR (1991).

=== Independent directing and producing work ===
Lawrence co-produced and co-directed the interactive documentary series Vis à Vis for PBS. The series began with Beyond the Veil (1998), which chronicled a digital dialogue between teachers in the United States and Iran. The series also included Blue & Black and Native Tongues, the latter featuring performers Ningali Lawford and James Luna.

His other producing credits include The Furious Force of Rhymes, a documentary exploring global hip-hop as protest music, and Sarabah (2011), which followed Senegalese rapper Sister Fa's campaign against female genital cutting. Sarabah received the "Matter of Act" award at the Movies That Matter Festival. He also served as the New York producer for Heddy Honigmann's documentary 100 UP.

Lawrence co-produced, co-directed and co-filmed The Cat Rescuers (2018) with Rob Fruchtman, a portrait of four animal-rescue activists in Brooklyn. The film received the Zelda Penzel Giving Voice to the Voiceless Award at the Hamptons International Film Festival. He also co-directed and co-produced The Invisible Extinction (2022) with Sarah Schenck, focusing on scientists studying and racing to save the human microbiome, which premiered at CPH:DOX.

In 2025, Lawrence produced a remastered and expanded version of The Long Way Home, featuring a new epilogue co-directed with Susanne Rostock. The updated version premiered at the Museum of Modern Art in New York City in January 2026.

== Link TV ==
In 1999, Lawrence co-founded Link TV, a free satellite television channel broadcasting international news and cultural programming. As Link's vice president of music and cultural programming, he developed and produced programming strands dedicated to world music and cinema. This included the Cinemondo series, hosted by Peter Scarlet, which provided U.S. television premieres for international directors including Asghar Farhadi, Claire Denis, and Aleksandr Sokurov.

For Link TV, Lawrence produced or directed several music and human-rights projects, including The Price of Silence, a music video marking the 60th anniversary of the Universal Declaration of Human Rights co-produced with Amnesty International USA. He also produced and directed Blueprint for Accountability: Working the Dark Side, a special on U.S. torture and interrogation policies during the "War on Terror," hosted by Rachel Maddow. Lawrence departed Link TV in 2010.

== Awards and recognition ==
- Cine Golden Eagle, feature documentary — Vis à Vis: Native Tongues
- Movies That Matter "Matter of Act" award, best documentary — Sarabah
- Hamptons International Film Festival, Zelda Penzel Giving Voice to the Voiceless award — The Cat Rescuers
- Illuminate Film Festival, Director's Choice award — The Invisible Extinction

== Selected filmography ==
Year	Title	Role	Notes
2026	The Long Way Home: Remastered and Expanded	Producer, co-director (epilogue)	Premiered at the Museum of Modern Art
2022	The Invisible Extinction	Co-director, co-producer, cinematographer	Premiered at CPH:DOX
2019	100 Up	New York producer	Directed by Heddy Honigmann
2018	The Cat Rescuers	Co-director, co-producer, cinematographer	Winner, Hamptons International Film Festival Award
2011	Sarabah	Producer, executive producer	Winner, Movies That Matter "Matter of Act" Award
2010	Kayhan Kalhor: Songs of Hope	Producer, director	Broadcast on Link TV
2010	The Furious Force of Rhymes	Producer	Premiered at Locarno International Film Festival
2007	Married in America 2	Producer	Directed by Michael Apted, broadcast on Hallmark Channel
2003	Vis à Vis: Native Tongues	Producer, director, writer	Broadcast on PBS
2002	Married in America	Creator, producer	Directed by Michael Apted, broadcast on A&E
1998	Vis à Vis: Beyond the Veil	Producer, director, writer	Broadcast on PBS
1998	Vis à Vis: Blue and Black	Producer, director, writer	Broadcast on PBS
1990	Age 7 in the USSR	Creator, producer	First film in the Born in the USSR series, broadcast on PBS
1989	The Long Way Home	Producer	Directed by Michael Apted; premiered at Sundance Film Festival
1987	Tell Tchaikovsky the News: Rock in Russia	Producer, director	Broadcast on MTV
1987	Artists United Against Apartheid: The Making of Sun City	Director, co-producer	Broadcast on MTV
