= Prototype 180 =

Art installation in Houston

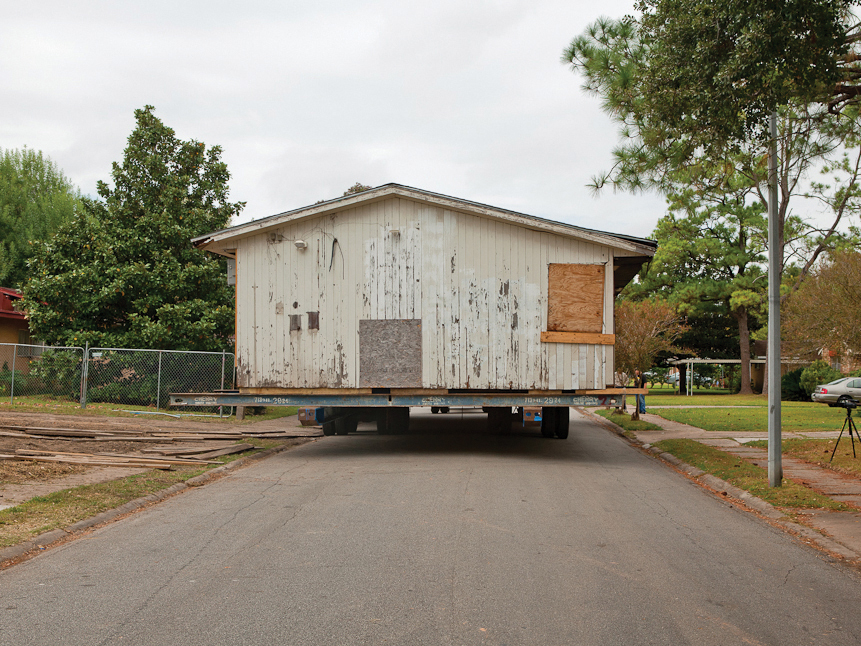
Mary Ellen Carroll, prototype 180, 2010. Photo by Kenny Trice.

prototype 180 is an artwork by conceptual artist Mary Ellen Carroll who lives and works in New York City.

prototype 180 is located at 6513 Sharpsview Drive, Houston. Houston, Texas was chosen as the site of the artwork because it lacks an official land-use policy. There is no zoning law in Houston.

Phase III for prototype 180 will commence in 2027 and when prototype 180's structure will be rebuilt and the land will be re-wilded. Material scientists on reconstituting the construction debris that was saved from the unbuilding of prototype 180. It will be utilized for the reconstruction of the design of the original house elevated above the floodplain.

Research conducted with botanists and landscape architects are underway on the materials and plans for the re-wilding and the xeriscaping of the land at prototype 180 for the micro park as a public entrance to Bayland Park. The soil testing is underway. The prototype of a Kevlar hydroponic curtain / fence that will surround the site at prototype 180 is in its design phase. A workforce development component that will utilize the new materials and processes in underserved areas in Houston near prototype 180 is in formation.

prototype 180 as a work of art "make[s] architecture performative." It is literally a ground-shifting exercise, because it structurally involved the 180 degree revolution, from front to back of a single-family home and its surrounding plot of land in the development of Sharpstown, a post-war development in Houston, Texas.
