= Street Light Shine =

Studio album by the Shirts
- Released: 1979
- Genre: Rock
- Label: Capitol
- Producer: Mike Thorne

The Shirts chronology
The Shirts (1979)	Street Light Shine (1979)	Inner Sleeve (1980)

Street Light Shine is the second album by the American band the Shirts, released in 1979. They supported it with a North American tour. "Out on the Ropes" was released as a single.

== Production ==
The album was produced by Mike Thorne. The songwriting was shared by the six bandmembers. "Triangulum" is a science fiction narrative.. "Outside the Cathedral Door" contains elements of prog rock.

== Critical reception ==
Professional ratings
Review scores
Source	Rating
AllMusic	2.5/5 stars
Alternative Rock	7/10
Robert Christgau	B−
The Encyclopedia of Popular Music	2/5 stars
The Great Indie Discography	4/10
The Muncie Star	B−
Omaha World-Herald	4/5 stars
The New Rolling Stone Record Guide	1/5 stars

The Globe and Mail stated that "there are traces of the New Wave freneticism here, but once past the opening cut, 'Laugh and Walk Away', this outfit settles comfortably into a ballad groove." The Omaha World-Herald noted the "distinctive, varied sound marked by a minimum of anger and negativism." The Spokane Daily Chronicle said that the Shirts' style "is too nebulous, too undefined to be distinctive." Hit Parader dismissed the Shirts as "quite possibly the worst band in New York City."

The Gazette concluded that, "without losing a cutting edge, the sextet shows a penchant for hooks, unusual chord changes, and eminently commercial ditties". The Pittsburgh Press said that the band "deal in arty rock and deliver it in above-average performances." The Daily Breeze called the album "a platter full of overly-sophisticated cabaret-style mish-mash". Robert Christgau stated that the band's "sincerity can be infectious."

== Track listing ==
No.	Title	Length
1.	"Laugh and Walk Away"
2.	"Love Is a Fiction"
3.	"I'm in Love Again"
4.	"Milton at the Savoy"
5.	"Ground Zero"
6.	"Triangulum"
7.	"Out on the Ropes"
8.	"Starts with a Handshake"
9.	"Maybe, Maybe Not"
10.	"I Feel So Nervous"
11.	"Outside the Cathedral Door"
