= Married in America =

Documentary series by Michael Apted

- Created by: Michael Apted
- Directed by: Michael Apted
- Country of origin: United States
- No. of episodes: 2

Production
- Producers: Steve Lawrence; Dale Riehl
- Running time: 132 minutes (US) / 120 minutes (UK)

Original release
- Network: A&E; Hallmark Channel
- Release: June 17, 2002 – May 23, 2007

Married in America is a documentary film series that follows the lives of nine American married couples. Directed by British director Michael Apted, it is a similar take on his famed Up series.

== Premise ==
Beginning in 2001, interviews were intended to be conducted every five years to gauge the lives of the couples and to evaluate American married life as a whole. Participants were asked about their feelings and perceptions of their marriage and married lives. The collective interviews were intended to provided insight into the state of marriage and how it changed over time, but were limited to just a short five-year period by the series' cancelation after release of the second movie.

== Participants ==
Participants were selected to highlight the different social, economic, and cultural factors that can affect marriage.

- Amber and Scott – Scott, a former United States Marine, is married to Amber, a cosmopolitan woman. They currently live in Alabama.
- Betty and Reggie are an interracial couple that have known each other since childhood. They were childhood sweethearts, and were married and now live in Queens, New York.
- David is a widower who found companionship in Brenda after his wife's death. They were married in Mexicali, Mexico, near where Brenda's family lives.
- Chuck and Carol have been married multiple times in their lives. They have children and grandchildren already with other partners.
- Cheryl and Neal are a multicultural couple. Cheryl is Filipino, and Neal is Jewish. Cultural and religious differences between their families have led to tension. They were married in Walt Disney World and currently live in Manhattan.
- Donna and Todd are upwardly-mobile "yuppie" New Yorkers. They were married shortly before the September 11 attacks.
- Nadine and Frank are an African-American couple. Nadine is a pharmacist, while Frank is a steelworker. They got married despite the seven-year age disparity between them.
- Toni and Kelly are a lesbian couple living in central New Jersey. They were initially wed through a civil union in Vermont, later having a non-binding ceremony for family and friends. They have been involved in same-sex activism and gay rights issues.
- Vanessa and Chris were married days after the September 11 attacks. Chris is a New York City police officer, and Vanessa is a housewife.

== Episode list ==
- Married in America – June 17, 2002, on A&E
- Married in America 2 – May 23, 2007, on Hallmark Channel
