= Robert Hammond (author) =

Robert Morris Hammond (December 29, 1920 – April 16, 2009) earned a BA from the University of Rochester (1942), and both an MA (1947) and PhD (1952) from Yale University. He was awarded a Fulbright Fellowship to France (1949-1950) along with numerous other honors, fellowships and grants. Hammond was an instructor, and then professor of French at the University of Arizona (1953-1967). He later was professor of French at Harvard University (1965-1966), and a visiting professor of French Literature and Cinema at Wells College in Aurora, NY (1967-1968). From 1968, Hammond taught at SUNY-Cortland, where he also served as chair of the International Communications and Culture Department. Upon his retirement in 1988 he moved to Paris, France.

Along with being a dedicated instructor, Hammond published numerous analyses and critiques of French literature and films, translated texts between French and English, and contributed countless papers and general scholarship on the French cinema. Much of Hammond's extensive scholarly work focuses on French filmmaker Jean Cocteau, and his bilingual edition of Cocteau's Beauty and the Beast is widely cited within the academy. Hammond is also the author of over 40 plays in both English and French and various other works of both poetry and prose.

In 1983 Hammond donated his collection of 275 French film scripts to the Fales Library of NYU, creating the Hammond Film Script Archive and continued to acquire and donate scripts throughout the years since his original gift. As of March 2003, the Hammond Film Script Archive consists of 454 scripts spanning the years 1935 through 1996.

In 1995 Hammond again made a major donation in the form of his personal papers. The Robert Hammond Papers provide important links to the Film Script Archive as well as primary research materials for students working in Cinema Studies.
