= Historic Films Archive =

Coordinates: 41.102096°N 72.363318°W

Historic Films Archive is a stock footage library operating from New York. It owns the rights to an extensive collection of television and film footage dating back to 1895. Its library includes all genres of American Music on film and video and historic archive footage derived from American Newsreels, Feature Films, Industrial shorts, home movies, out-takes and cartoons.

== History ==
The company originated as a Manhattan based research archive named Associated Researchers and Image Quest; it was founded by Joe Lauro and Richard Plagge in 1991. Lauro had previously worked for Archive Films as a researcher and Plagge for Fox Movietone News when they decided to form their own company. They soon realized that licensing footage was more lucrative than acting as researchers.

In 1993, the company moved to East Hampton, close to Plagge's home.

In 1994 Plagge died, and Lauro formed a partnership with California producer Andrew Solt, the owner of the rights to The Ed Sullivan Show. They converted ARIQ into the Historic Film Archive in 1997.

The Historic Films library is fully digitized and its material is viewable for research purposes on its official website.

== Collection ==
- The Ed Sullivan Show
- The Steve Allen Show (1955–60)
- Beat Club/Musikladen
- Center For Southern Folklore
- Classic Comedy Library
- Classic TV Commercial Collection
- Dance Party USA/Dancin' On Air
- Danish Broadcasting (DR) Archive
- D.A. Pennebaker Collection
- Disco Magic/Disco '77
- Folklife Productions Library
- The Red Skelton Show (1951–71)
- Metropolis Video–live from CBGBs
- Music Video Collection
- The Ernest Tubb Show
- The Hollywood Out-Take Library (1930s-50s)
- Live From The Bitter End
- Screenocean (Channels 3 & 4 UK)
- Midsummer's Rock Festival
- Murray "The K" Archive
- Pathe News, Inc.
- Glen Campbell Show (1969–73)
- Rollin On The River
- Rainbow Quest (1965–66)
- Rhythm & Blues Awards Shows/Ebony Affair
- Sam Lay Blues Collection
- Snader Telescriptions
- Storyville Jazz Collection
- WTTW's Sound Stage (1974-1983)
- Southern Telenews Library (1958–1978)
- Studio 54 Collection
- Rockpalast (German live concert series 1970s-2000s)
- The Beat (1965–67)
- The Dallas Pop Festival (1969)
- The David Susskind Show
- The Hagermann Beatles Collection
- The Hy Lit Show
- The Jam Handy Collection/American Industrial Fins 1915-85
- The Jerry Lewis Show (1964–70)
- The Last Of The Wild (Nature Series)
- Film & Video Stock Shots Library
- Don Kirshner's Rock Concert/In Concert
- The Woodstock Collection
- Tribute Grand Ole Opry Stars of the 1950s
- Isle Of Wight Festival 1970
- United News Collection (1942–44)
- Universal Newsreels (1929–67)
- Vidicom Fashion Film Collection (1980s and 1990s)
- Newport Folk Festival (1963–69)
- M&T News Service (1985-2003)
- Black Journal (on behalf of WNET)
- Little Walter Home Movies
- Steel Pier Show (1970s-80s)
- cd:uk (British Music program 1990s-2007)
- CD:USA (2007)
- MTV MUSIC NEWS SEGMENTS/Azar Collection (1981–85)
