= CBGB's and the Birth of U.S. Punk =

2002 music compilation

Compilation album
- Released: April 8, 2002
- Genre: Punk rock
- Length: 63:10
- Label: Ocho Records

CBGB's and the Birth of U.S. Punk is a music compilation released on April 8, 2002. It focuses on bands that played at CBGB, a New York club in the Bowery district associated with the emergence of punk rock in the United States. In 2002, CBGB's founder and owner, Hilly Kristal, traveled to London to promote the album's release. At the time, bands like The Hives and The Strokes were bringing the CBGB sound up to date.

The compilation features eighteen tracks selected by British rock critic Johnny Chandler. In sixty-three minutes and ten seconds, it provides an overview of the history of American punk rock, from its origins in garage rock to the formation of bands such as the Ramones, Television, and Suicide. Many music critics have described it as an invaluable "history lesson" for anyone interested in punk's origins.

== Background and publication ==
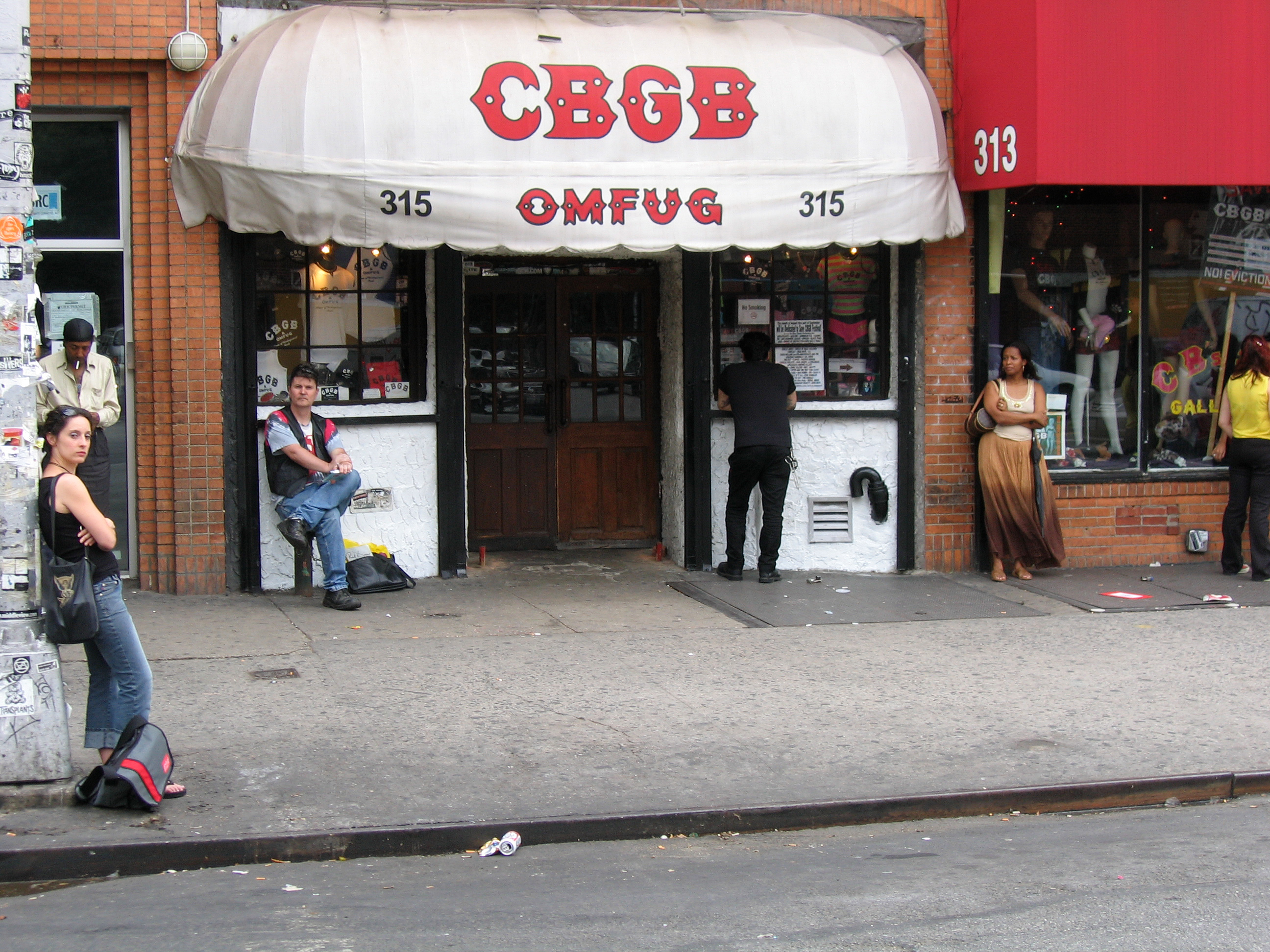
Facade of CBGB in 2005

In 1973, the New York club CBGB opened its doors in the Bowery district. The club initially catered to country, folk, bluegrass, and blues fans, hence the name CBGB. The project was unsuccessful, and the club was forced to welcome bands from other musical genres to avoid bankruptcy. Television, the Ramones, Blondie, and other similar bands performed at the club regularly. From that point forward, CBGB became synonymous with the advent of the American punk rock movement. It has since been regarded as a legendary establishment in the industry.

The musical acts performed at the club during the mid-1970s significantly influenced the development of the British punk scene that emerged in 1976-1977. Bands like The Hives and The Strokes released albums twenty-five years later, reflecting the continued relevance of the CBGB sound in the modern era. In 2002, club founder and owner Hilly Kristal traveled to London to promote the release of CBGB's and the Birth of U.S. Punk. The album was released a few weeks after the Ramones and Talking Heads were inducted into the Rock and Roll Hall of Fame. The album was released on April 8, 2002, by Ocho Records, a Union Square Music label.

== Contents ==
British rock critic Johnny Chandler, who also wrote the liner notes for the compilation, selected the individual tracks on CBGB's and the Birth of U.S. Punk. In the accompanying booklet, he states that the album is intended as a tribute to Hilly Kristal, her club, and her tireless commitment to promoting freedom of expression. The album CBGB's and the Birth of U.S. Punk features eighteen tracks that trace the history of American punk rock, from its origins in garage rock to the emergence of bands like the Ramones, Television, and Suicide. The compilation lasts sixty-three minutes and ten seconds, features six punk and twelve garage rock songs. The album primarily features bands that performed at CBGB, including the Ramones, Television, Blondie, Dead Kennedys, and The New York Dolls. The album proceeds chronologically, with selections from bands such as The 13th Floor Elevators, The Seeds, and The Sonics, active in the mid-1960s. The album contains many well-known songs, including a live version of "Friction" by Television and a demo of "Judy Is a Punk" by The Ramones.

== Analysis ==
In summary, the compilation reflects punk rock's crude, nihilistic side. The overarching tone of CBGB's The Birth of U.S. Punk is described as "dark and often discordant," with themes encompassing art, nihilism, and heroin. As reported by Q magazine, the eighteen tracks are characterized by an energetic and hedonistic tone. The compilation features various musical styles, including 1960s garage rock, acid punk, and songs by seminal bands such as Iggy and the Stooges, New York Dolls, and The Modern Lovers. The album's tracks exemplify the defining elements of punk, including the exuberant "Judy Is a Punk" and the cynical "Blank Generation". "I'm Waiting for the Man", recorded ten years before the advent of punk, has a very raw sound, while Pere Ubu's "Heart of Darkness" evokes the style of 1975 Joy Division. The CBGB atmosphere is reflected in songs like Television's live "Friction" version.

== Reception ==
Mojo magazine's take on CBGB's and the Birth of U.S. Punk is a tribute and comprehensive documentation of American punk rock and CBGB, tracing the genre's roots. Eric Carr of Pitchfork concurs, describing the album as "a perfect history lesson", "a love letter to an era", and "an excellent album". Additionally, he provides insight into lesser-known bands such as The Sonics and The Dead Boys. The Music in Belgium website recommends the compilation as a valuable resource for anyone seeking insight into the current landscape of punk music by delving into its roots. It is an essential reference for those who were part of the historical development of this genre.

Uncut commends the compilation as "a fantastic anthology" and draws parallels between some of the album's tracks and those of The Strokes. Q describes the compilation as "eclectic" and believes it to be "an essential history lesson for those interested in the roots of punk". The magazine deems the compilation worthy of purchase solely for The Sonics' rendition of "Louie Louie". A Wessex Scene journalist notes that the album serves as a reminder that American counterparts did not always use the term "punk" in vain. In Kerrang! Mark Griffiths recommends the album to those wishing to discover the inspiration behind The Strokes and The Hives, making it a valuable resource for music enthusiasts.

Music in Belgium and Uncut express surprise at the absence of Patti Smith and Talking Heads, while The Independent laments the lack of bands like Count Five, MC5, and The Standells. Dotmusic's Andy Strickland questions the relevance of returning to 1965 with The Seeds. However, he deems the compilation an optimal introduction to American punk. Hour Community's Jamie O'Meara notes that the sound quality is mediocre but recommends the compendium for the available tracks. Eric Carr of Pitchfork believes it is an unfortunate decision not to arrange the tracks on the compilation in chronological order. Additionally, he deems some of the songs on the album to be substandard. Mark Deming of AllMusic has identified an error in Television's live version of "Friction." The recording was not made at CBGB, as previously believed, but at another American club called My Father's Place.

== Tracks ==
N°	Title	Group	Time
1.	"I'm Waiting for the Man"	The Velvet Underground	4:38
2.	"Louie Louie"	The Sonics	2:55
3.	"Excuse, Excuse"	The Seeds	2:20
4.	"Slip Inside This House"	The 13th Floor Elevators	8:03
5.	"Trash"	New York Dolls	3:08
6.	"Tight Pants"	Iggy and the Stooges	2:12
7.	"Agitated"	Electric Eels	2:09
8.	"Speed Queen"	Suicide	2:29
9.	"Heart of Darkness"	Pere Ubu	4:46
10.	"Blank Generation"	Richard Hell and the Voidoids	2:55
11.	"Friction" (live)	Television	4:59
12.	"I Had Too Much to Dream Last Night"	Wayne County and the Electric Chairs	4:18
13.	"Rip Her to Shreds"	Blondie	3:20
14.	"California Über Alles"	Dead Kennedys	3:03
15.	"Sonic Reducer" (original mix)	The Dead Boys	3:00
16.	"Judy Is a Punk" (original 1975 demo)	Ramones	1:37
17.	"Born to Lose" (lost '77 mix)	Johnny Thunders and the Heartbreakers	3:05
18.	"Roadrunner (Once)"	Jonathan Richman and the Modern Lovers	4:03

== Bibliography ==
- Strickland, Andy. "Various Artists – 'CBGB's and the Birth of US Punk' (Ocho)". dotmusic. Archived from the original on 2003-01-07.
- O'Meara, Jamie. "CBGB's and the Birth of U.S. Punk". Hour Community. Archived from the original on 2018-03-20.
- "Albums" (PDF). Wessex Scene (755): 4. 2022-05-17.
- "Album: Various". The Independent. 2002-04-19.
- "Trans-Atlantic Union". Billboard. Vol. 114, no. 15. 2002-04-13. p. 54.
