= Berlin Airlift (album) =

Studio album by Berlin Airlift
- Released: 1982
- Recorded: Hit factory, NYC, July and August, 1982
- Genre: Pop
- Length: 45:44
- Label: Handshake Records/CBS
- Producer: Bill Pfordresher

Berlin Airlift chronology
Berlin Airlift (1982)	Professionally Damaged (1983)

Professional ratings
Review scores
Source	Rating
AllMusic	3/5 stars

Berlin Airlift is the debut album by the American rock band Berlin Airlift. It was released in 1982 by Handshake Records (distributed by CBS). Handshake Records declared bankruptcy 6 weeks after the album was released, dooming the album. Over the Hill (I Love You) and Don't Stop Me from Crying were radio favorites in Boston.

== Track listing ==
All songs by Rick Berlin.

1. "Airlift" – 12:52
2. "Teenage Terror" – 2:39
3. "It's You I Love" – 3:50
4. "Girl in the Moon" – 3:50
5. "Can I Fall in Love" – 4:50
6. "This Is Your Life" – 2:52
7. "Don't Stop Me from Crying" – 3:45
8. "Over The Hill (I Love You)" – 3:10
9. "My Heart Ain't Big Enough for You" – 4:40
10. "I Hate Everything But You" – 2:55

== Credits ==
- Rick Berlin – vocals
- Steven Paul Perry – Guitar, vocals
- Jane Balmond – Keyboards
- Chet Cahill – Bass, Vocals
- Joe Petruzelli – drums, percussion, Vocals
- Paul McAlpine - Photography and Art Direction
