= GoNightclubbing =

- Known for: Video artists
- Movement: Punk rock
- Website: www.gonightclubbing.com

GoNightclubbing is a collaboration between video artists Pat Ivers and Emily Armstrong, who worked together to document the New York punk rock scene beginning in 1977. Ivers had previously worked with Metropolis Video from 1975 until their dissolution in 1977. Originally, Ivers and Armstrong were known as Advanced TV, but they incorporated as GoNightclubbing in 2001.

== Background ==
Ivers and Armstrong videotaped hundreds of bands between 1977 and 1981 at venues like CBGB’s, Max’s Kansas City, Mudd Club and Hurrah’s. Described as “the Lewis and Clark of rock video,” they used hand held cameras and audio from the sound board of the clubs to make their Gonightclubbing archive. The use of this equipment created a visual style that fit the scene that it documented—Michael Shore of Rolling Stone called their "visual fidelity" "perfect." Their archive was arguably the premiere video record of the Downtown punk scene.

In 1979, their music series Nightclubbing debuted on Manhattan Cable TV’s Channel 10. It was a weekly half-hour program, showcasing live performances of bands they had documented from their vast archive.

Nightclubbing was nominated for a Cable Ace award for best variety series in 1980. It was shown at Anthology Film Archives as a late night weekly screening between January and March,1980.

In May, 1980, they worked at the original incarnation of the nightclub Danceteria, pioneering the concept of the VJ (Video Jockey) and designing the first standalone Video Lounge. Originally designed as a one-night-only art installation, it proved so successful that it became a regular nightly feature of the club. With multiple TV sets arranged as living room groupings, Ivers and Armstrong showed a mix of found footage, music videos, artists work and selections from their own archive and also documented bands live, feeding the video up to the Lounge in real time. After the club was closed by the State Liquor Authority, a robbery occurred, costing them a third of their video archive. The tapes were never recovered.

In 1981, Ivers and Armstrong toured the country with their GoNightclubbing video programs, showing at museums and nightclubs in Atlanta, Chicago, Los Angeles, Minneapolis and San Francisco.

In 2000, GoNightclubbing resurfaced at the opening of the Pioneer Theater, an independent cinema in the East Village, with a five-week series of programs. Ivers and Armstrong resumed shooting with a series of interviews of veterans of the punk scene, including Lenny Kaye and Jay Dee Daugherty of the Patti Smith group, Richard Lloyd of Television, Cheetah Chrome and Jeff Magnum of the Dead Boys. The same year, they were invited to the Institute of Contemporary Art in London to host a series of screenings. The Guardian applauded it as “five priceless programs… capturing the raw visceral energy of bands unhindered by MTV self-consciousness."

In 2001-2002, they toured the US, invited to the Andy Warhol Museum in Pittsburgh, the Experience Music Project in Seattle and the Walker Arts Center in Minneapolis, with stops in Portland, Chicago and San Francisco as well.

In 2010, New York University’s Fales Library and Special Collections digitized and restored the GoNightclubbing Archive as part of their Downtown Collection. The archive is now available for use by scholars and researchers. With videos of over 82 bands at 112 performances, 27 on camera interviews, hundreds of photos, ephemera, music videos, and video art, this "massive" collection offers a snapshot of the time and culture of Downtown New York in the late 1970s and early 1980s.

In 2012, Bedford and Bowery, part of the New York Times Magazine, invited Ivers and Armstrong to write about the restoration of their archive in a weekly feature, which ran for nearly a year.

To celebrate the acquisition by the Downtown collection, in 2014, Ivers and Armstrong created “GoNightclubbing: A Modern Punk History,” a multi-media project including video screenings at the Museum of Art and Design, a photo and ephemera exhibition at Fales, live talks, and a recreation of the iconic Video Lounge and larger than life images of punk icons at the 80 Washington Square East Gallery.

In 2015, Ivers and Armstrong premiered “Alone At Last: an Interactive installation Exploring Gender, Identity and Desire Before the Aids Crisis” at the Howl! Happening gallery. Using the trope of the Times Square peep show booth, "Alone at Last" examines the broad spectrum of sexual expression that existed in the heady days of downtown bohemia before AIDS struck the artistic community there. Fifty video seducers invite the viewer/participant to share some time in the dark with a stranger and question what s/he really wants. Anticipating YouTube and cyber hookups, "Alone At Last" can be described as a cultural record of a time gone by and a celebration of its freedom.

== Screenings and exhibitions ==
=== 2000–present ===
- Austin Film Society Cinema, Austin 2018
- University of Georgia, Athens, Georgia 2016
- Cine Theater, Athens, Georgia 2016
- Howl! Happening Gallery, New York, New York 2015
- Tropic Cinema, Key West, Florida, 2015
- Key West Museum, Key West, Florida 2015
- Tracey-Barry Gallery at New York University Fales Library, New York, NY 2014
- 80 Washington Square East Gallery, New York, New York 2014
- Museum of Art and Design, New York, New York 2014
- International House, University of Pennsylvania, Philadelphia, PA 2014
- CBGB Festival, New York, New York 2013
- CBGB Festival, New York, New York 2012
- Pop Montreal Festival, Montreal, Quebec, Canada 2012
- Big Sky Documentary Film Festival, Missoula, Montana 2012
- Guggenheim Lab, New York New York 2012
- Webster Film Festival, St. Louis, Missouri 2011
- Exile on Bowery, New York, NY 2011
- Downtown Show II, New York, NY 2010
- Howl Festival, New York, NY 2008
- Galatos Art Center, Auckland, New Zealand, 2007
- North By Northwest Music Festival, Toronto, Ontario, Canada, June 2007
- The Downtown Show, New York City, March 2006
- Rock and Roll Hall of Fame, Cleveland, Ohio, September 2004
- The Knitting Factory, Los Angeles, California 2003
- Andy Warhol Museum, Pittsburgh, Pennsylvania, November 2002
- Gene Siskel Theater, Chicago, Illinois, October 2002
- Snake Pit, Denver, Colorado, August 2001
- Bluebird Theater, Denver, Colorado, May 2001
- Walker Art Center, Minneapolis, Minnesota, March 2001
- VIEWPOINT Documentary Film Festival, Ghent, Belgium, February 2001
- Experience Music Project, Seattle, Washington, January 2001
- Clinton Street Theater, Portland, Oregon, January 2001
- Yerba Buena Center for the Arts, San Francisco, January 2001
- Institute of Contemporary Arts, London, UK, December 2000
- Yerba Buena Center for the Arts, San Francisco, September 2000
- ARTHOUSE, Dublin, Ireland, August 2000
- Institute of Contemporary Arts, London, UK, July 2000
- Pioneer Theater, New York City, February 2000

=== 1970s–1980s ===
- Whitney Museum of American Art, New York, New York
- National Video Festival, American Film Institute, Washington, DC
- Beauborg Centre, Paris, France
- Institute of Contemporary Arts, London, England
- MoMA PS1 Opening, Long Island City, New York
- Walker Art Center, Minneapolis, Minnesota
- Art Institute of Chicago, Chicago, Illinois
- Long Beach Museum of Art, Long Beach, California
- BACA Video Festival, Brooklyn, NY
- 544 Natoma Performance Gallery, San Francisco, California
- Roxy Cinema, San Francisco, California
- Chicago Museum of Contemporary Art, Chicago, Illinois
- Kitchen Center for Art and Music, New York, New York
- Anthology Film Archives, New York, NY
- New Cinema, New York, NY
- Women Make Movies, New York, NY
- Buffalo Media Center, Buffalo, NY
- UCLA Film Center, Los Angeles, California
- Video Art Telethon, Channel 10, New York, NY
- Women’s One World Festival, New York, NY
- Monumental Art Show, Brooklyn, NY
- Times Square Show, New York, NY
- Avantgarde Festival, New York, NY
- Seattle Video Festival, Seattle, Washington
- Danceteria, New York, New York
- Mudd Club, New York, New York
- Zerozero, Los Angeles, California
- Youthinasia, New York, New York
- 9:30 Club, Washington, DC
- Neo, Chicago, Illinois
- Café Argyle, Los Angeles, California
- Café de Grande, Los Angeles, California
- Flipper, Los Angeles, California
- 688 Club, Atlanta, Georgia

== Public collections ==
The GoNightclubbing archives are held as part of the Downtown Collection at the New York University Fales Library and Special Collections.

== Awards and nominations ==
- Acker Award for Achievement in the Avant Garde
