= Professionally Damaged =

EP by Berlin Airlift
- Released: 1983
- Recorded: White Dog Studio, Newton, MA
- Genre: rock
- Length: 26:36
- Label: Lo-Tech Records
- Producer: Berlin Airlift and Phil Adler

Berlin Airlift chronology
Berlin Airlift (1982)	Professionally Damaged (1983)

Professional ratings
Review scores
Source	Rating
Allmusic	3/5 stars

Professionally Damaged is a six-song EP by the American rock band Berlin Airlift. It was released in 1983 by Lo-Tech Records. The EP features Hunger Strikes, number one local song of 1983 on Boston radio station WBCN.

== Track listing ==
All songs by Rick Berlin.

1. "Stop and Think About It" – 2:02
2. "I Don't Know How to Be Cool" – 4:13
3. "Hunger Strikes" – 7:11
4. "Do it Tonight" – 3:21
5. "Not Guilty" – 4:21
6. "Smoke Is Risin'" – 5:21

== Credits ==
- Rick Berlin - vocals
- Steven Paul Perry - Guitar, vocals
- Jane Balmond - Keyboards
- Chet Cahill - Bass, Vocals
- Glen Moran - drums
