= Metropolis Video =

- Formation: 1975
- Dissolved: 1977
- Type: Film and video makers
- Headquarters: New York City
- Key people: Paul Dougherty John Hazard; Jeff Hodges; Pat Ivers; Steve Lawrence; Michael Owen Tom Zafian
- Website: www.metropolisvideo.net

Metropolis Video was a group of filmmakers and video makers who documented on video the early years of the punk rock music scene in New York City, from 1975 to 1977. They shot footage of numerous punk rock and new wave bands at CBGB, the downtown music club, which in 1975 had been open only two years.

Much of Metropolis Video's work was shown on public access cable television. In October 1977 there was a two-day show of their work at The Kitchen, New York’s premiere avant-garde and experimental arts center, which was located in SoHo at that time.

The New York Times music critic John Rockwell wrote that because of Metropolis Video's work and their cable TV series, "the efflorescence of the New York underground rock scene at the CBGB club will live on past the present moment.

== History ==
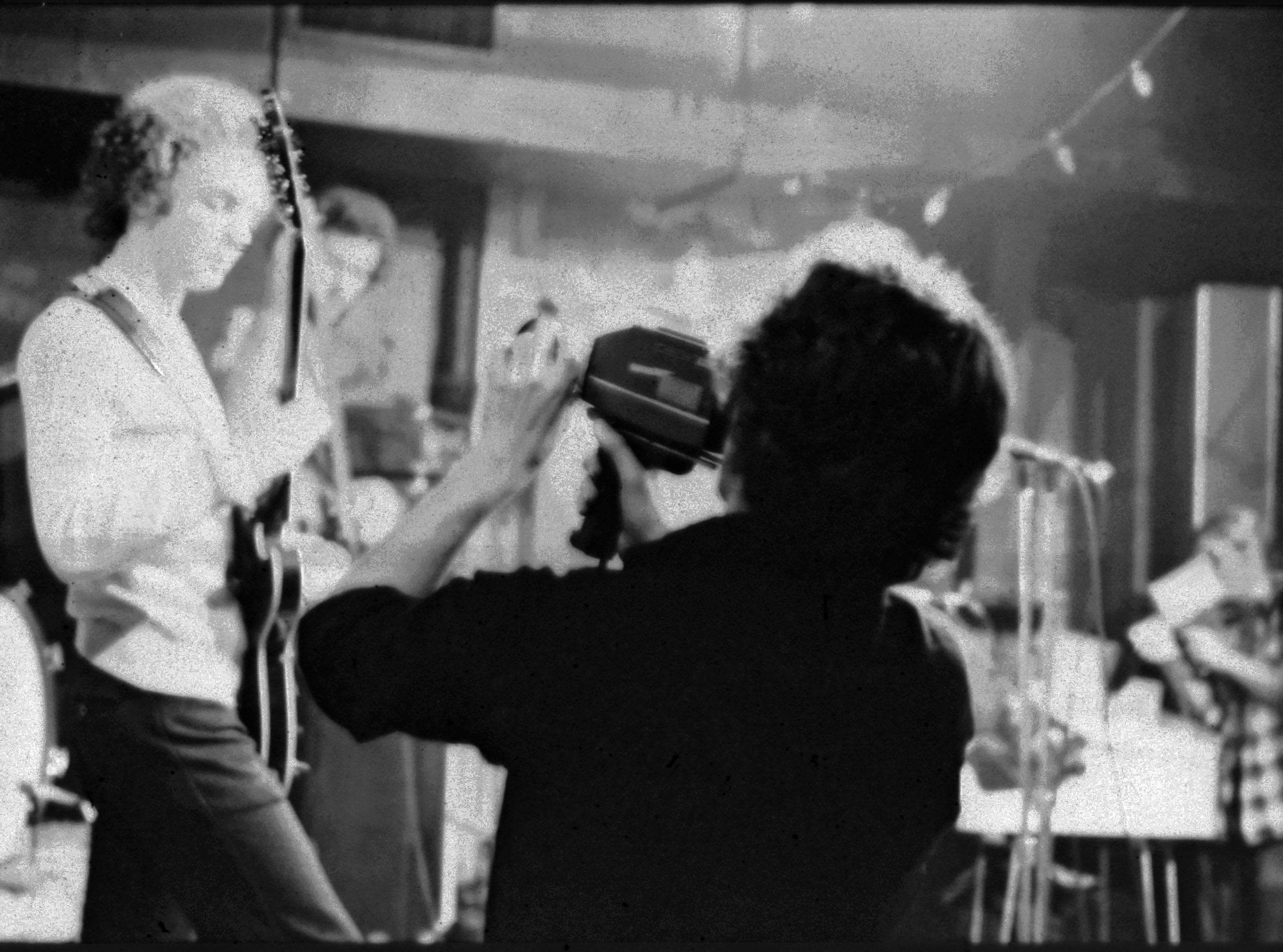
Pat Ivers of Metropolis Video shooting Orchestra Luna at CBGB's in 1975

In 1975, seven film and videomakers who were then in their early 20s, Paul Dougherty, John Hazard, Jeff Hodges, Pat Ivers, Steve Lawrence, Michael Owen and Tom Zafian, came together to document the early punk rock scene at CBGB, which in 1975 was a relatively new music club on The Bowery, in Manhattan, New York City. The members of Metropolitan Video met while they were working at Manhattan Cable TV's public access television (MCTV) department, where community members could get free training in video production, borrow equipment and schedule their programs for broadcast. In 1972 the Federal Communications Commission (FCC) had mandated that cable TV systems in the top 100 markets must provide public access, and by 1975, MCTV had become a major distribution hub for video experimentation, the YouTube of its day.

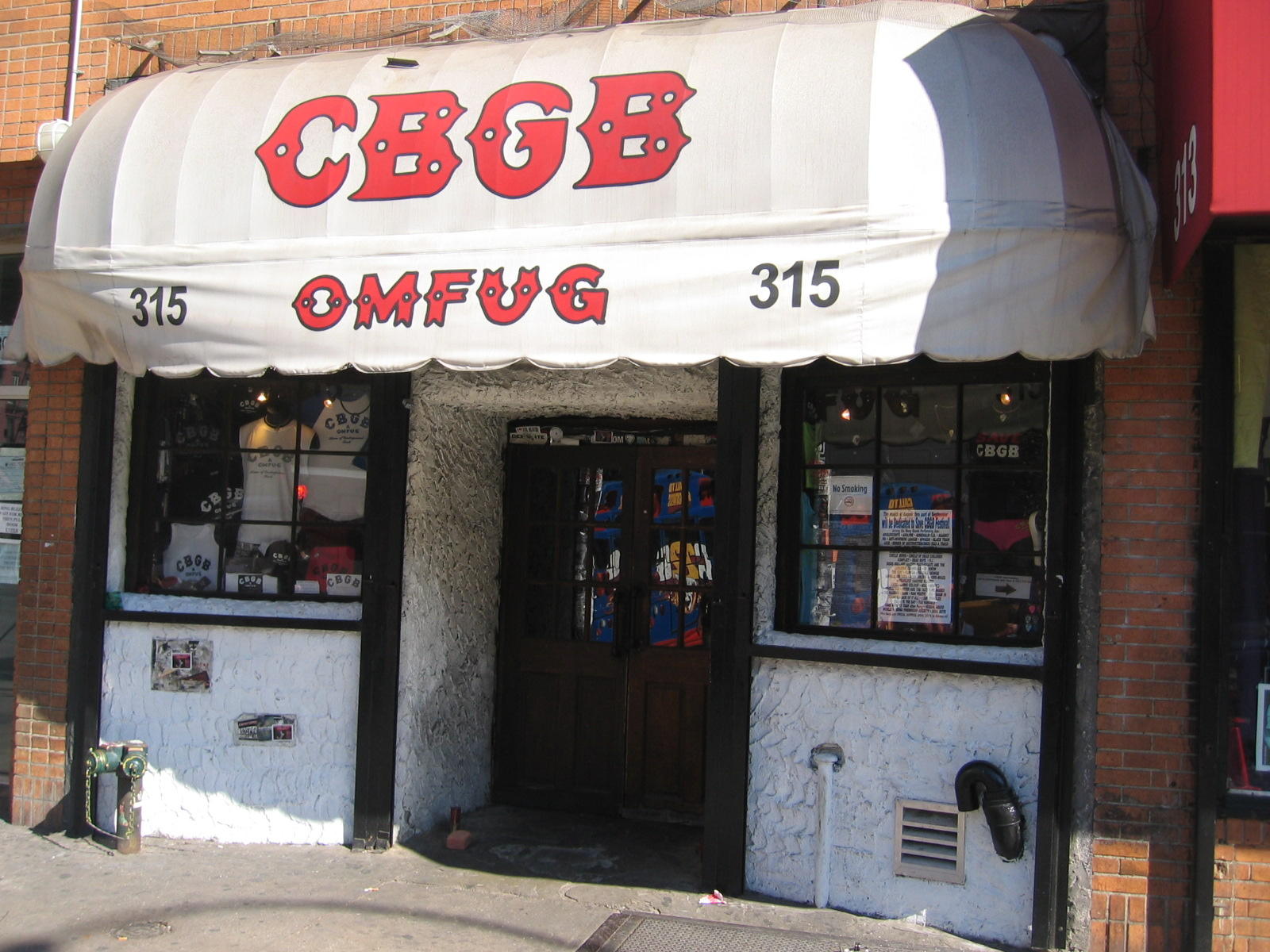
Facade of CBGB, New York

In August 1975, Metropolis Video members convinced CBGB's owner Hilly Kristal to let them shoot performances. The group descended into the then little-known club with a multi-camera, live-switched, live-mixed audio/video system and despite the limitations of their set up, produced some of the most complete documentation of the early New York punk rock music scene in existence. The collection of videos is now represented by Historic Films.

After the dissolution of Metropolis Video in 1977, filmmaker Pat Ivers continued to film the New York punk scene together with Emily Armstrong in a project called Advanced TV, later dubbed GoNightclubbing.

== Programs ==
Metropolis Video’s first project, the CBGB Festival of Unrecorded Bands, in August 1975, captured Blondie, Joe and Blake, The Heartbreakers with Richard Hell (their third live performance), and Talking Heads (as a trio). Metropolis Video shot Talking Heads on two other occasions, in October and December 1975. The December concert is excerpted in the 2011 film produced by Eagle Rock Entertainment, Talking Heads: Chronology.

Other bands recorded by Metropolis Video at CBGBs were The Shirts, the Tuff Darts (featuring Robert Gordon), Ruby and the Rednecks, and Orchestra Luna.

Elephant's Memory was also documented in a show in New Haven in 1976; this was Metropolis Video’s last project as a group.

The Kitchen press release from 1977

== Cable television ==
Rock from CBGB's was a three-part series that aired on Manhattan Cable's Public Access Channel D in 1975, showing excerpts from the collection of band performances.

== Public screenings ==
Metropolis Video's work was shown, in a multi-monitor format, in two sold-out shows called Rock from CBGB's by Metropolis Video at The Kitchen, an art and performance space in Lower Manhattan, on October 6 and 8, 1977. The hour-long event featured performances by Talking Heads, Tuff Darts, Heartbreakers and Orchestra Luna.
