= The Shirts =

- Origin: New York City, New York, U.S.
- Genres: Punk rock; new wave
- Years active: 1975–1981; 2003–present
- Labels: Harvest, Capitol

The Shirts are an American punk rock band from New York City, formed in 1975. The band's early existence (1975 to 1981) was closely linked with CBGB, a music club in the Bowery. The band reformed with many of its early members in 2003 and remains active.

== History ==
=== Formation and CBGB years (1975–1981) ===
The Shirts had their roots in Brooklyn, where Robert Racioppo and Artie Lamonica had been playing together on and off as early as 1970. Members of the band were gradually added, including lead singer Annie Golden and guitarist Ronnie Ardito. The band got its name when Racioppo, having just broken up his existing band, asserted his desire to form a new one, and his indifference to its name: "call it anything ... shirts ... pants ... shoes ... The Shirts!" The newly named band, eventually including nine musicians, played covers at small venues in New York until, in 1975, they went to a show at CBGB featuring Patti Smith and were inspired to play there using only their original material.

The Shirts auditioned for CBGB owner Hilly Kristal which resulted in the band being hired, first to open for other bands, including Television and Talking Heads, then to play as the headliner band. As the band honed their skills and developed new songs, they played at other local venues such as Max's Kansas City. Like many of the bands championed by Kristal, their sound was more pop and dance-oriented than the art bands that gained fame in association with CBGB.

Although little interest was initially shown in the band by American record labels, The Shirts were featured on a double compilation album featuring the major bands of the CBGB scene in the mid-70s, Live at CBGBs. However, Nick Mobbs of EMI signed the band to EMI's Harvest label in the fall of 1977, and assigned Mike Thorne to produce their first album. Largely for corporate purposes, the band was signed by EMI in conjunction with its US subsidiary label, Capitol Records, which had initially passed on signing the band. This formality would eventually have a significant impact on the band's early history.

The band's debut album, The Shirts, was recorded in London, while lead singer Golden commuted back to the US to shoot Miloš Forman’s screen version of Hair, and released in 1978. The album gained popularity in Europe, with the single "Tell Me Your Plans" charting at top five in the Netherlands. The band went on to tour Europe opening for Peter Gabriel, at his request.

Producer Thorne chose to record the band's second album, Street Light Shine (1979), at Mediasound Studios in New York City. The resulting sound was much more eclectic than their debut album and the album became a financial and critical success in Europe, with the single "Laugh and Walk Away" again charting high in the Netherlands. However, a breakthrough in the US market continued to elude the band.

For the band's third album, Capitol Records made a deal with EMI in which the band would be signed solely to Capitol. Now under Capitol's management rather than Thorne's, recording went poorly and the resulting album, Inner Sleeve (1980), was not properly supported by the label, with only 10,000 copies being pressed. The band continued playing for another two years, but with the failure of their third album and changes to their line-up over the years, The Shirts broke up in 1981. On September 26, 2025 a session recorded at Manhattan's Hi-Five Studios in 1981 was released on the Live feat. Annie Golden album. A show recorded in Boston on August 27, 1979 is released on the Live At Paradise 1979 album. This album also contains two songs from a show at the Paradiso in Amsterdam on August 15, 1980.

=== Reunions and reformation (1994–present) ===
Members of the band, some of whom had stayed in the music business, reunited twice in the 1990s to play benefits for CBGB, which periodically suffered tax issues. Efforts were made to reform The Shirts, which included early auditions with Golden, who had established a career in film, television and theatre, and two other female singers, Caren Messing and Kathy McCloskey, who had worked with Racioppo in another band. Golden ultimately decided not to join the reformed band, and Messing and McCloskey would go on to share the vocal role together. The reformed band played their first public show at CBGB in May 2003, and continued to perform periodically.

In 2006, The Shirts recorded and released their first album in over 25 years, Only The Dead Know Brooklyn, at the studio their former producer Thorne had opened. In 2010, The Shirts released their fifth studio album The Tiger Must Jump.

As of 2014, both Racioppo and Lamonica have pursued spin-off projects, with Racioppo forming Bob of The Shirts and Lamonica forming 'Rome 56'.

== Discography ==
=== Studio albums ===
- The Shirts (1978) - No. 22 Dutch Album Charts
- Street Light Shine (1979)
- Inner Sleeve (1980)
- Only the Dead Know Brooklyn (2006)
- The Tiger Must Jump (2010)

=== Live albums ===
- Live feat. Annie Golden (2025)
- Live At Paradise 1979 (2026)

=== Singles ===
Year	Title	US Bubbling	NED	BEL	Label
1978	Tell Me Your Plans b/w Cyrinda	50	8	6	Harvest Records HAR 5165
1978	Running Through the Night b/w Lonely Android	-	-	-	Harvest Records HAR 5170
1978	Reduced to a Whisper b/w The Story Goes	-	-	-	Harvest Records 5C 006-06910
1979	Out on the Ropes b/w Maybe, Maybe Not	-	-	-	Harvest Records HAR 5190
1979	Can't Cry Anymore b/w I'm in Love Again	-	-	-	Capitol Records 4750
1980	Laugh and Walk Away b/w Triangulum	-	10	17	Harvest Records HAR 5195
1980	One Last Chance b/w Too Much Trouble	-	-	-	Capitol Records CL 16161
2024	Move On Groove On c/w Deux Royal	-	-	-	TLAK Records TLA S009
