= CBS Music =

Composition by Leonard Bernstein

- by Leonard Bernstein
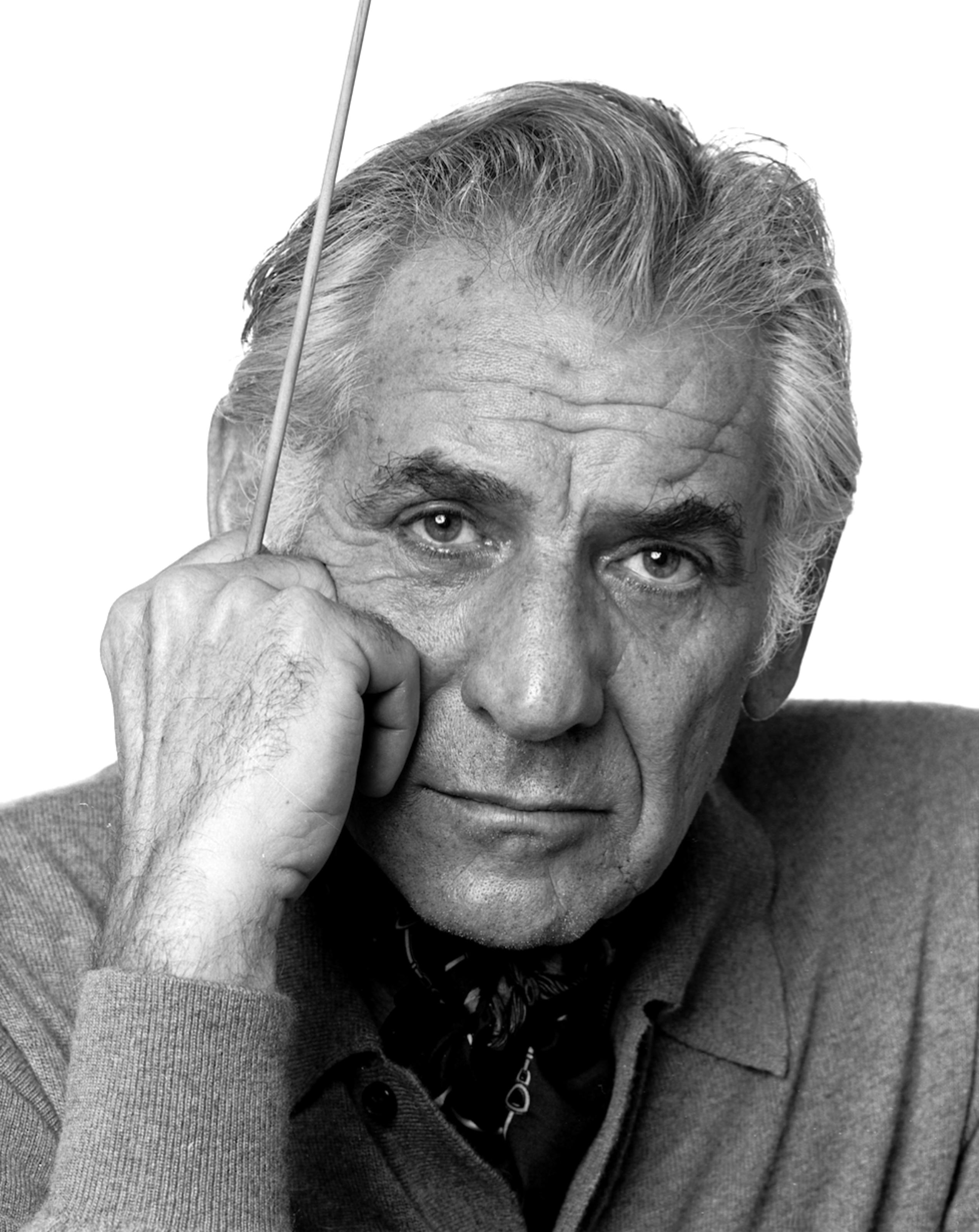
- Bernstein in 1977
- Composed: 1976

CBS Music is a 1976 composition by Leonard Bernstein. It was written to commemorate the 50th anniversary of the CBS television network. The notes of the piece (C, B♭ and E♭) spell out 'CBS' with the E♭ pronounced 'S' in German. The score of CBS Music was subsequently withdrawn by Bernstein, and he reused parts of it in his piece Halil: Nocturne.

It was orchestrated by Sid Ramin and arranged by Jack Gottlieb.

The first and last movements of the CBS Music were premiered on CBS TV on 1 April 1978 during the 50th-anniversary celebrations of the channel. It was recorded by Marin Alsop with the São Paulo State Symphony Orchestra in a 2018 recording for Naxos Records.

== Movements ==
There are five movements:

1. Fanfare and Titles
2. Quiet Music
3. Blues
4. Waltz
5. Chorale
