= DeCoursey Fales =

American lawyer

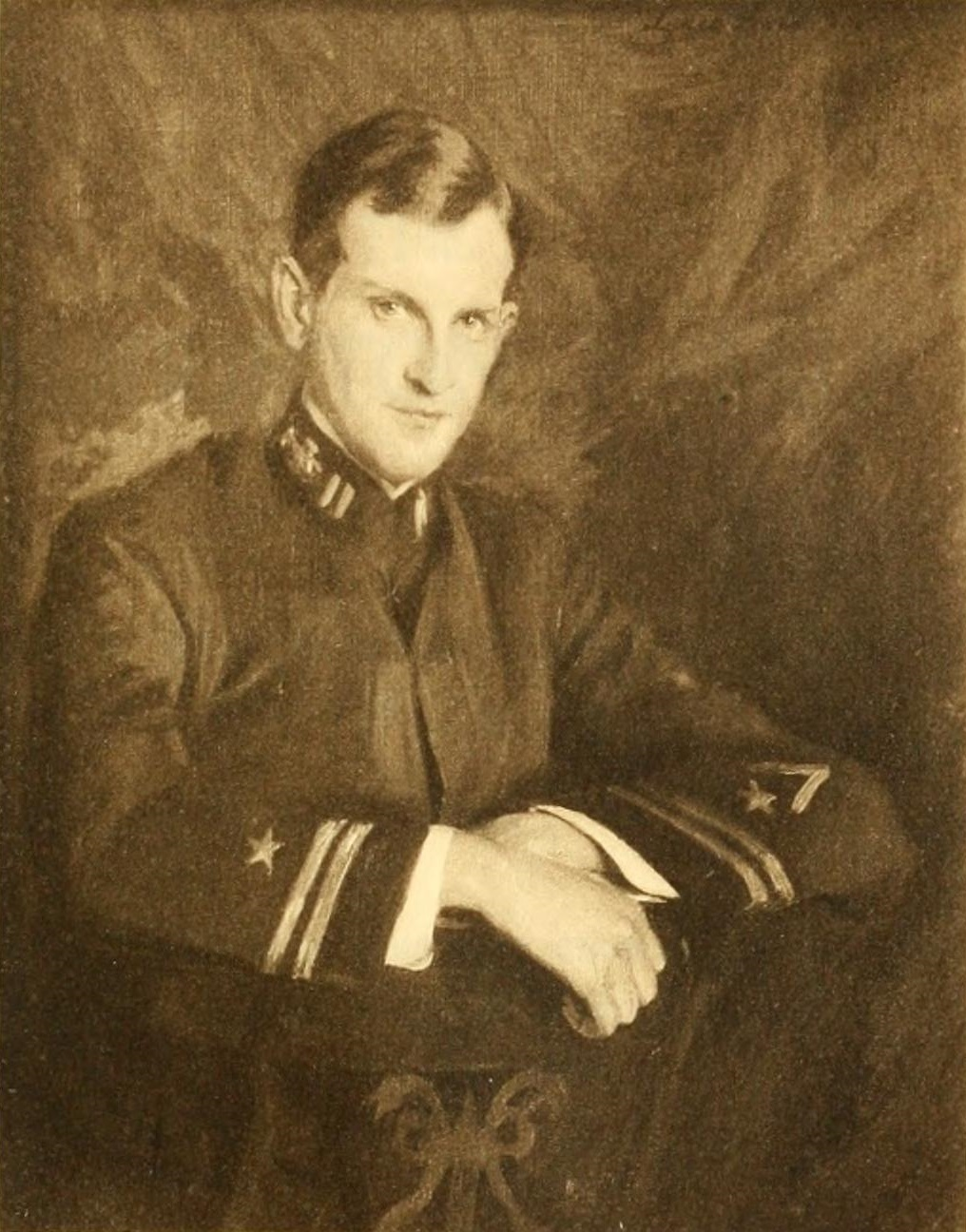
De Coursey Fales, after a 1919 portrait by Lydia Field Emmet.

DeCoursey Fales (June 1, 1888 – June 19, 1966) was an American lawyer, banker, collector, bibliophile and yachtsman.

DeCoursey was born in Saranac Lake, New York. He attended Harvard University, where he developed an intense love for British and American fiction. In the last years of his life, Fales devoted himself full-time to collecting. Fales collected fiction books and manuscript materials. Fales' manuscript collecting started with Walter Scott materials, and around that core, his collection grew to around 50,000 items pertaining to various authors spanning the 18th and 20th centuries. He began donating parts of his manuscript and book collections to New York University in 1957. Other parts of his collection donated to the New York Public Library, Manhattan College, and the Morgan Library (of which he was a life fellow). DeCoursey chose to dedicate the Fales Library at NYU to his father, Haliburton Fales. Along with these two collections, Fales also donated the Fales Family Papers, which date back to 1620.

DeCoursey Fales was a member of the Fales Family. The Fales family can claim ancestry back to the Puritan settlers who arrived in New England on the Mayflower. Eventually, the family was centered in Bristol, Rhode Island. The family's surnames include: Haliburton and Dunlap and the descendants have been involved with politics (Andrew Dunlap, 1796–1835), aviation, collecting, yachting, philanthropy and other assorted businesses and interests. DeCoursey Fales wrote an in-depth description of the family and its history up to 1919 titled The Fales Family of Bristol, Rhode Island.

He died in New York City in 1966.
