= Robert Blanchon =

American artist

Robert Blanchon (1965–1999) was an American artist born in Foxboro, Massachusetts. His conceptual artworks often dealt with histories of American Conceptual Art, the politics of AIDS and representations of queer sexuality.

Blanchon attended the School of the Art Institute of Chicago from 1984 to 1989, earning both a BFA and a MFA. While in Chicago, Blanchon was an active participant in the non-profit art scene, curating exhibitions at N.A.M.E. gallery, contributing to Tony Tasset, et al.'s artist project Anonymous Museum, and designing a poster for the City of Chicago's billboard campaign Art Against AIDS: On the Road.

From 1989 to 1994, Robert Blanchon lived in New York City and worked in the Communications Department at the New Museum of Contemporary Art while producing his photographic, sculptural, performance, and video artworks. He worked in the studio of Mary Ellen Carroll that was also shared with Charles Brown and Omar Lopez-Chahoud at 480 Canal Street, Suite 703, New York City. This is where he completed many of his early photographic series including the stains, tattoos, and greeting cards series. Also during this period, Blanchon created two of his most widely known and exhibited artworks, "Untitled (self-portrait)" (1991), a series of fourteen self-portraits commissioned by street artists, and "Protection" (1992), a letter by the artist to his mother telling her he was HIV positive, juxtaposed with her twelve-page response. He had two solo shows in New York City, at Artists Space in 1994 and at White Columns in 1995.

In 1995, Blanchon moved to California to take a position as an artist-in-residence at the University of California, Irvine. Teaching and art-making were from this point forward his main occupations. While in California, he produced the video "let's just kiss + say goodbye" (1995), which was exhibited in national and international film festivals, and he had two major solo shows, one at the Los Angeles Center for Photographic Studies in 1996 and one at Marc Foxx Gallery in the following year. He worked at UC Irvine until 1997, leaving after being denied a tenure track position despite his popularity with students who voted him Best Teacher in 1996.

In the spring of 1998, Blanchon moved back to Chicago to become an artist-in-residence at the School of the Art Institute of Chicago, and in the fall of the same year, he took another artist-in-residence position at The University of North Carolina at Chapel Hill. During this time he had a solo show of new works of photography and sculpture at the June and John Alcott Gallery in Chapel Hill. The following spring he returned to the School of the Art Institute of Chicago to teach a graduate level seminar. By the end of the summer Blanchon was hospitalized due to complications related to AIDS, and died on October 3, 1999, at age 33 in the ICU at Cook County Hospital in Chicago.

Following his death, the Robert Blanchon Estate was established to manage his archive and artistic legacy. In 2003, The Judith Rothschild Foundation awarded the Robert Blanchon Estate at Visual AIDS the initial funding for the organization of his work and archive. Mary Ellen Carroll who is the Executor of The Robert Blanchon Estate partnered with Visual AIDS working with Amy Sadao, the Executive Director of Visual AIDS and Nelson Santos, the Associate Director. Sasha Archibald was hired as the project director for The Robert Blanchon Estate Project. The Andy Warhol Foundation for the Arts provided support for the monograph of Robert Blanchon that was published by Visual AIDS, edited by Tania Duvergne, designed by Danielle Aubert, and distributed by D.A.P. DISTRIBUTED ART PRESS, INC, with essays by Greg Bordowitz and Sasha Archibald.

In 2009, Marvin Taylor the Director of the Fales Library and Special Collections at New York University acquired the archive and works in The Robert Blanchon Estate. Marvin Taylor was introduced to The Robert Blanchon Estate and Mary Ellen Carroll through Julie Ault. The exhibition of Robert Blanchon's work YOU MAKE ME FEEL (MIGHTY REAL) at the Fales Collection was held from November 19, 2009, until February 26, 2010, and was curated by Sasha Archibald, Tania Duvergne, and Bethany Martin-Breen.
