= Mary Ellen Carroll =

American artist

- Known for: Conceptual art, Performance art
- Notable work: prototype 180
- Awards: Guggenheim Fellowship (2003), American Academy in Rome/Guna S. Mundheim Fellowship (2022), Pollock/Krasner Awards (2018/1997), American Academy in Berlin Prize (2016), Anonymous Was A Woman (2024)
- Website: mecarroll.com

Mary Ellen Carroll / MEC, studios, How To Talk DIrty and Influence People — Contemporary Arts Museum Houston

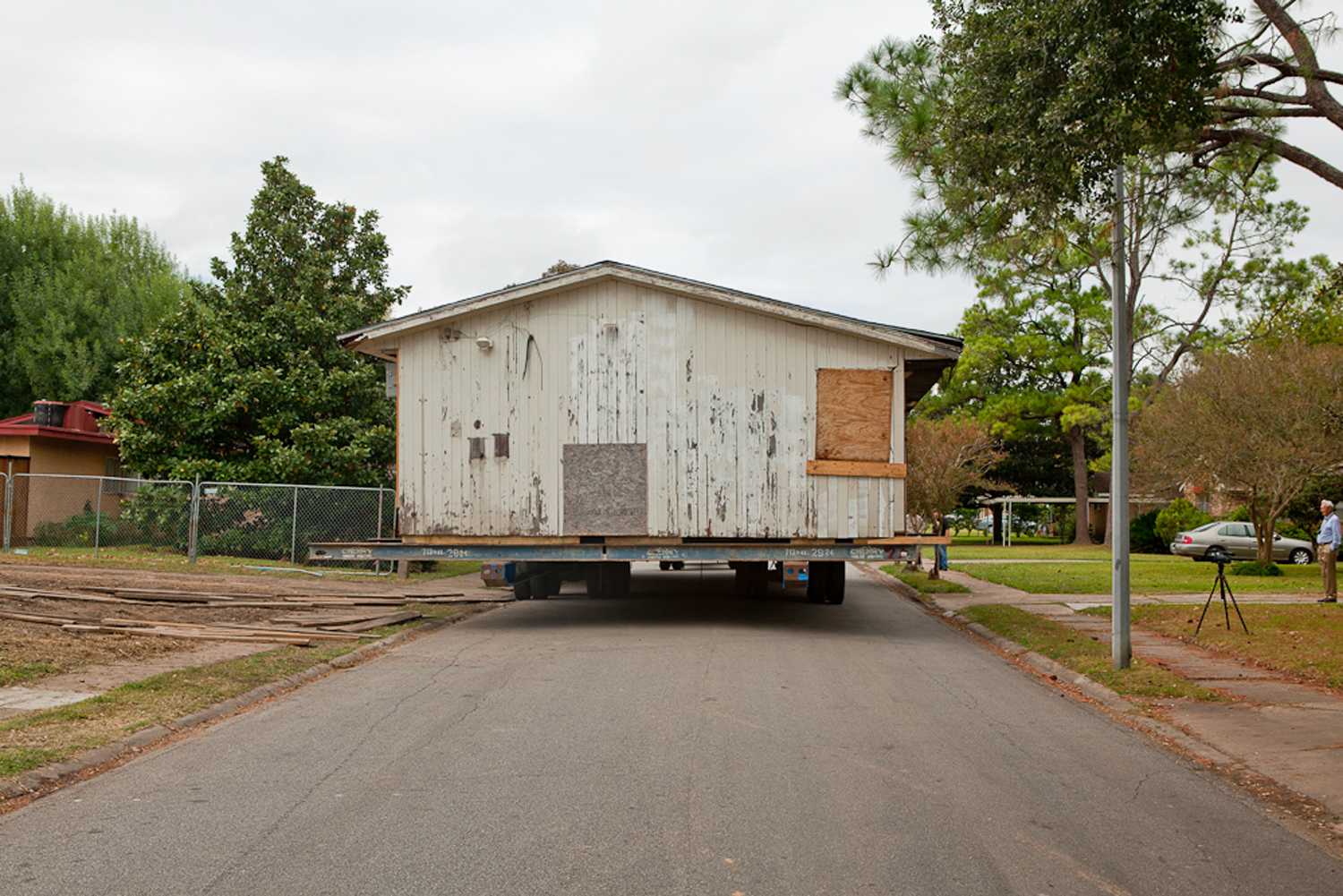
Mary Ellen Carroll / MEC, studios, prototype 180 : Phase I - The Revolution, November 11, 2010.

Mary Ellen Carroll is a conceptual artist and activist who lives and works in New York City. For over four decades the artist has exhibited internationally and in the US including the Busan Biennial in South Korea, Whitney Museum, Alserkal Avenue in Dubai, ICA London, PS1-New York, The Menil Collection in Houston, and MUMOK in Vienna. Carroll's first career survey, Mary Ellen Carroll: How To Talk Dirty and Influence People,(2026) is at the Contemporary Arts Museum Houston.

== Notable Exhibitions and Artworks ==
• In planning and development for nearly six years, Mary Ellen Carroll: How To Talk Dirty and Influence People the retrospective included the works illy and PUBLIC UTILITY 2.0-Thika Super Highway and over 60 other works from over four decades realized in collaboration with curator Rebecca Matalon and the exhibition designer, architect Juliana Ziebell. The making of the exhibition itself was a new work, SHALL that is built upon the notion that a museum exhibition can come as close as possible to producing zero waste. The work is realized through three commitments: 1) designing a circular system for the exhibition to eliminate building waste such as drywall by using Layher’s state of the art modular scaffolding as its structure and by employing reusable materials in the exhibition design (by architect Juliana Ziebell with CAMH’s head preparator Jeff Shore); 2) transporting the exhibition from New York City to Houston by electric cargo truck with Buoy Fine Art Services—understood to be the first long-haul EV transport for an art exhibition in the world—and 3) Charting the museum’s energy usage and the renewable energy sources.

• prototype 180 "makes architecture perform as a work of art" that is literally a ground-shifting exercise, in that it structurally involved the 180 degree revolution, back to front, of a house and its surrounding land in the development of Sharpstown, a suburb of Houston, Texas. Following the rotation, the structure was unbuilt in a choreographed demolition — prototype 180 : Phase II — The Unbuilding on November 11, 2017. Part III will be the rebuilding of the structure that is slated to begin in 2027. It will once again become an occupied structure that will function as an institute for the study of considered urbanism with a micro ethno-botanic garden . In planning for over a decade, prototype 180 is described as "reconsideration of monumentality that combines live performance, sculpture, architecture and technology." Carroll was a visiting lecturer in the Department of Architecture at Rice University and co-directed a graduate studio with the architect Charles Renfro | Diller, Scofidio + Renfro.

Mary Ellen Carroll / MEC, studios, indestructible language, 2006/2021, Glasgow, Scotland

• indestructible language is the large scale neon work on the climate emergency. It was the inaugural commission by the Precipice Alliance in 2006, the first international organization to commission high-profile, large-scale works of art on the subject of global warming. The project intentionally sited and temporarily located at the former American Can Company factory in Jersey City, New Jersey and consists of illuminated characters spelling out: IT IS GREEN THINKS NATURE EVEN IN THE DARK. indestructible language was installed for the UN's Climate Summit — COP26 in Glasgow and was initially illuminated on Saturday, October 30, 2021, and continues to be daily at sunset on The School House in Glasgow.

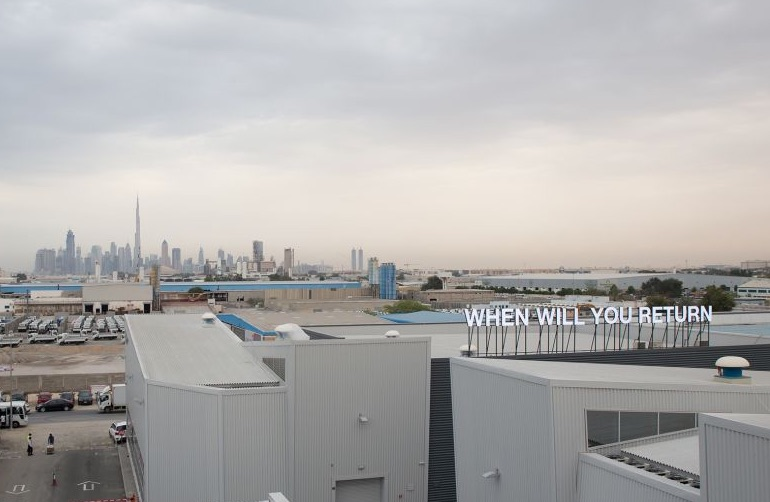
Mary Ellen Carroll / MEC, studios, The Circle Game / When Will You Return (2016) at Alskerkal Avenue in Dubai .

• The Circle Game is a permanent installation in the collection of the Alserkal Foundation in Dubai, UAE. Carroll was commissioned in 2016 to realize two site specific works of art that consist of two channel letter LED signs that read, WHEN DID YOU ARRIVE and WHEN WILL YOU RETURN, and a temporary five-story structure that used standard construction scaffolding to erect an edifice within the courtyard of Alserkal Avenue in 2016. The drawing as a built three-dimensional structure provided a platform from which it was possible to see one's self within Alserkal Avenue. The shift in elevation made it possible to have a 360-degree view of the city, providing a comprehensive view. The height of the structure was arrived at from the average of elevations of structures in the city and discussions were held on considered urbanism that included partners from the architecture firm OMA. It provided a physical understanding of the city and pointed to its origins in Deira, that intimate its return. Al Quoz was ‘seeable’ and one physically understood the lateralization of Dubai and how the skyscrapers are anomalies to the rest of the metropolis and where the emphasis has shifted the foundation into the cultural and the social realm.

Mary Ellen Carroll / MEC, studios — My Death Is Pending... Because., 2017 — Poster for the movie.

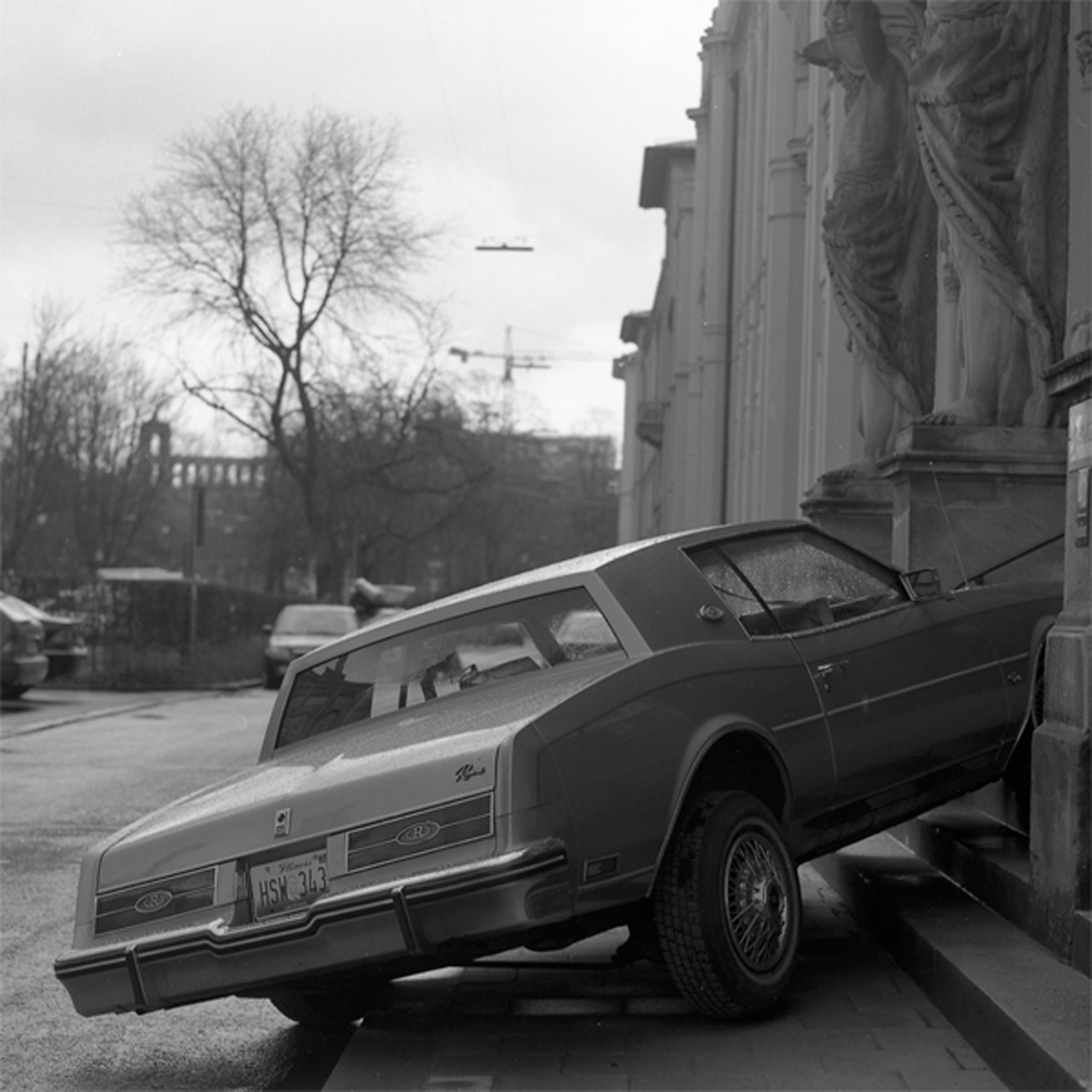
Mary Ellen Carroll / MEC, studios, LATE : My Death Is Pending... Because.

• My death is pending ... Because. is a series of artworks and performances started in 1986 that was completed in 2017 at Irwindale Speedway in the demolition derby — Nite of Destruction in Los Angeles and was filmed by director Giorgio Angelini, Michael Isabell of Eyespy Films, with still photographs by Michele Asselin. The series of works in My Death is Pending... Because. conception and production was developed as a Rube Goldberg machine, as a stream-of-consciousness methodology. My death is pending ... Because. exhibition and performance at Third Streaming Gallery in New York City and in Bridget Donahue Gallery.

Mary Ellen Carroll / MEC, studios, Thika Super Highway in Nairobi, Kenya — PUBLIC UTILITY 2.0 installed in How To Talk Dirty and Influence People at CAMH—

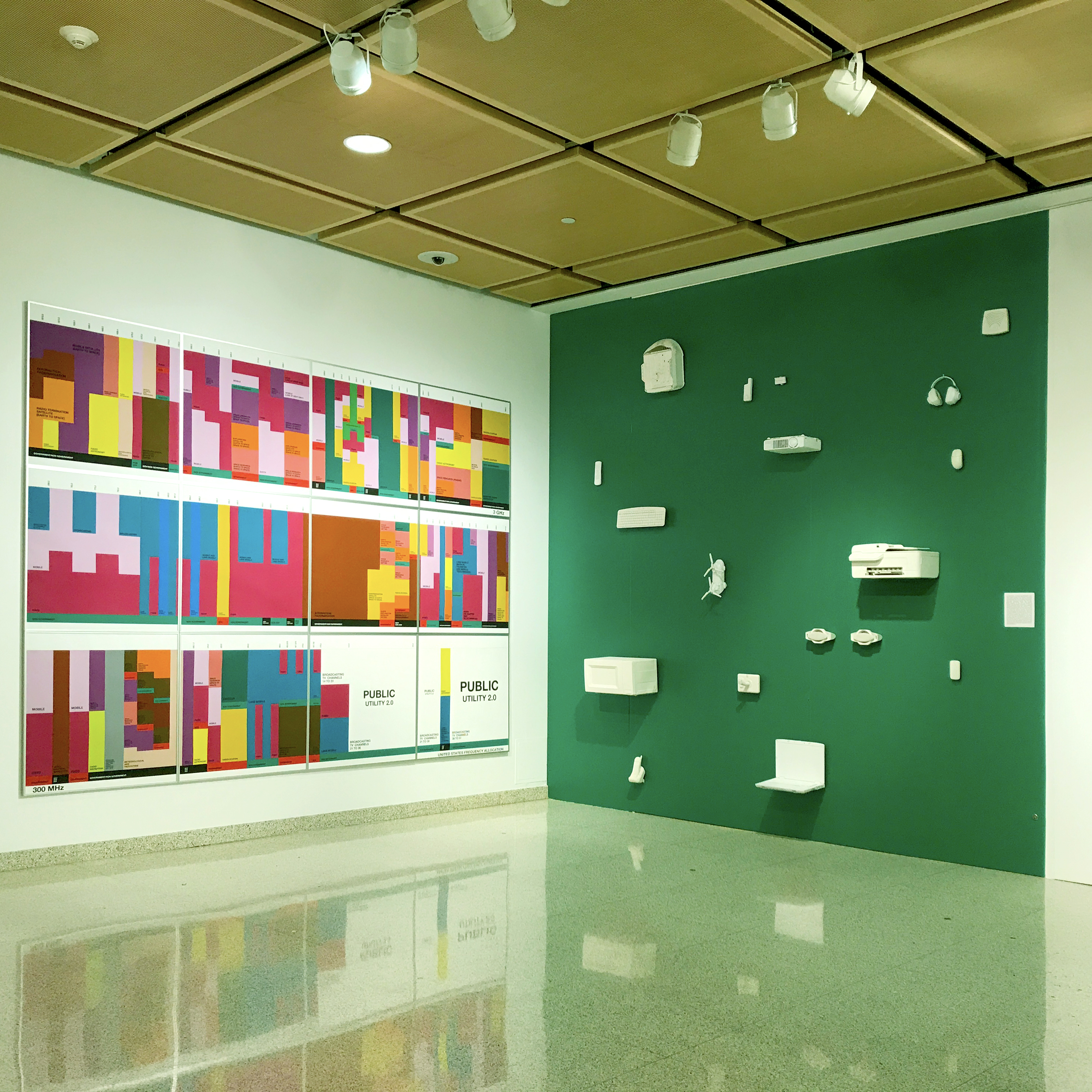
Mary Ellen Carroll / MEC, studios, PUBLIC UTILITY 2.0

• PUBLIC UTILITY 2.0 is the ongoing and architects the space of radio frequency as a work of conceptual art providing equitable Internet access and groundbreaking uses of spectrum in the cultural realm. Its path-marking in policy and technology is for the development of a sustainable model and will provide wireless broadband access and associative programming for cultural, educational, and economic development. It expands the design process from what is on the ground in the built environment to what is in the airwaves as a space. It retrofits the raw material of unused radio frequency with state of the art software defined radios and the accompanying policy for broadband wireless access. PUBLIC UTILITY 2.0 was a commission featured in the biennial Prospect.3|New Orleans under the artist direction of Franklin Sirmans and used TVWS and experimental licenses from the FCC for deployments. The newly unlicensed spectrum known as the Citizens Broadband Radio Service (CBRS) will be deployed in urban and rural use cases and it will include prototype 180 in Houston for the urban deployment.

• Nothing is the seminal series that was started by Carroll in 1996. Invited to participate in an exhibition and presentation in 2006 at the Foundation Telefónica and a residency in Ostende, Argentina Carroll walked out of the door of her New York residence and followed the written instructions for the work to leave with no possessions for use or exchange, and every interaction and element were considered a part of the performance for this iteration of Nothing. Carroll traveled with only her passport and the clothes on her back to spend six weeks in the county. By design there was no documentation of the performance. Nothing fomented public outcry in 2014 by noted art historians and art professionals including David Joselit-Harvard University, Frazer Ward-Smith College, and Yona Backer-Third Streaming when Marina Marina Abramović planned and titled a performance Nothing that for the Serpentine and failed to acknowledge Carroll's performance and historical precedent. in New York City. Carroll retains the registered trademark and copyright for Nothing.

• FEDERAL the 24-hour, two-theater movie was shot in 2003 and supported by the Guggenheim Foundation and the Rockefeller Foundation to Watch the Watchers. The movie is screened simultaneously with the north facade in one theater and the south facade in another starting at 9 am and continues until 9 am the following day, the same time the footage was shot in Los Angeles in 2003. The project title comes from the building where the movie was filmed, the Wilshire Federal Building.

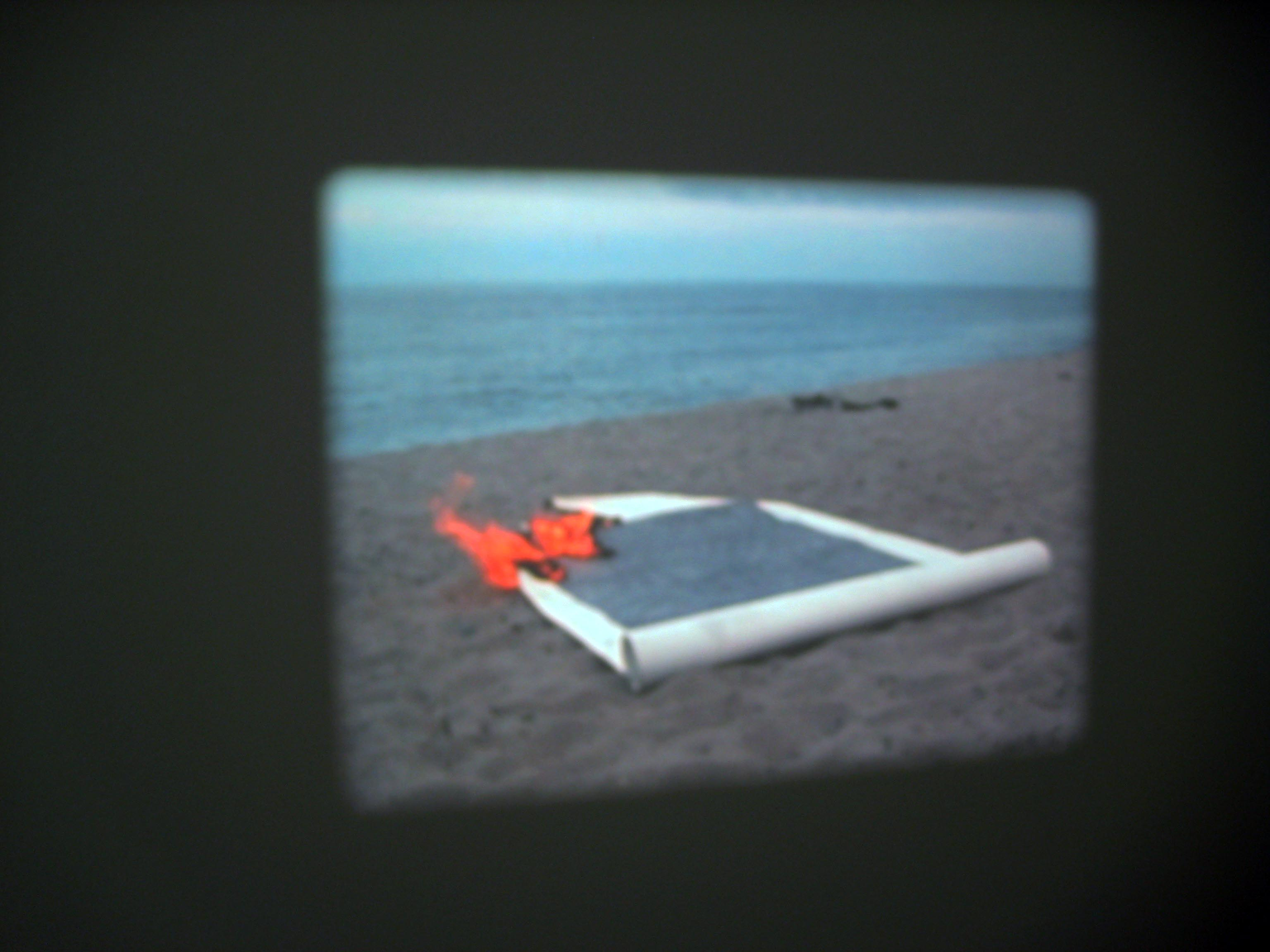
Mary Ellen Carroll, Alas, poor YORICK!

• Alas, poor YORICK!, 1998/99 - 2008, is the inclusive title of four artworks. In 1998/99 the entire text from Laurence Sterne's novel The Life and Opinions of Tristram Shandy, Gentleman was drawn on a 72 x 50 inches sheet of Arches paper, from which a silkscreen print was produced. On the ten-year anniversary of the drawing, August 8, 2008, Carroll procured a fire permit from the National Park Service in Truro, Cape Cod, Massachusetts. The drawing was burned at Long Nook Beach which is located on the ocean side of the Cape in Truro. The burning of the drawing took 00:10:15:07 minutes to complete and was filmed in Super 8 which was then transferred to MiniDV and finally to 16 mm film. The ash and charcoal was removed from the sand and was used to make a drawing of the black page on Arches paper. The film was screened in New York City, through the organization Light Industry, alongside Rachel Harrison as presented by David Joselit. Artworks from the series were included in The Evryali Score an exhibition at David Zwirner Gallery.

== Publications ==
How To Talk Dirty and Influence Peopleis the book that accompanies the exhibition of the same title published by Dancing Foxes Press and Contemporary Arts Museum Houston with design by Teo Schifferli. Introduction and text by Rebecca Matalon. Text by D. Graham Burnett, Pamela Lee. Poem by Iman Mersal and translation by Robyn Creswell. Fiction by Kathryn Scanlan. Interviews by David Joselit, Hamza Walker.

MEC was published by Steidl/Mack in May 2010 and is designed to reflect the conceptual system by which Carroll makes art. Its chapters bear the titles of sixteen of the 209 categories that Carroll has used since 1988 to organize a card catalog index of her ideas and potential works. The book received the AIGA award in 2010.

"A Modest Proposal/A Modist Prepozel" by Mary Ellen Carroll and Jonathan Swift. New York, NY: Presse Endémique, 1994.

"Without Intent", a documentation of Manhattan. Edition of 500, signed and numbered by the artist. New York, NY: Presse Endémique, 1996."

"100 German Men". New York, NY: Presse Endémique, 1998.

"All the men that think they can be me." Onestar Press, 2004.

== Awards, grants and honors ==
Carroll is the recipient of numerous grants and honors including:

- Anonymous Was A Woman, 2024
- American Academy in Rome Cynthia Hazen Polsky and Leon Polsky Fellowship, 2022
- IASPIS—Swedish Arts Grants Committee's International Programme for Visual and Applied Artists, 2018
- American Academy in Berlin Guna S. Mundheim Fellowship, 2016
- Guggenheim Fellowship, 2003
- Civitella Ranieri Foundation Fellowship
- Rockefeller Foundation Fellowship—Bellagio
- MacDowell Colony Fellowship, 1991
- Pollock-Krasner Foundation Grants, 2018/1997 Awards
- In 2010, Carroll was awarded a Graham Foundation for Advanced Studies in the Fine Arts Fellowship for prototype 180 and innovation territory and the AIA's Artist of the Year Award.
- Robert Rauschenberg Residency Fellowship.

== Teaching, Lectures, and Public Presentations ==
Teaching, lecturing and public presentations in architecture, art, and policy are an important part of Carroll’s work, stating that, “architecture is inherently a political act.” Institutions have included architecture/public policy programs at Rice University, Columbia University, Yale University, Princeton University and the DIA Art Foundation amongst others.

== Early life and education ==
Mary Ellen Carroll lives in New York City. Carroll received a Bachelor of Science degree and minored in fine art and worked with Betty Woodman and made films when Stan Brakhage taught at the University of Colorado Boulder. Carroll received a Master in Fine Arts from the School of the Art Institute of Chicago.

== See also ==
- Robert Blanchon
