= CBGB =

Former music club in New York City

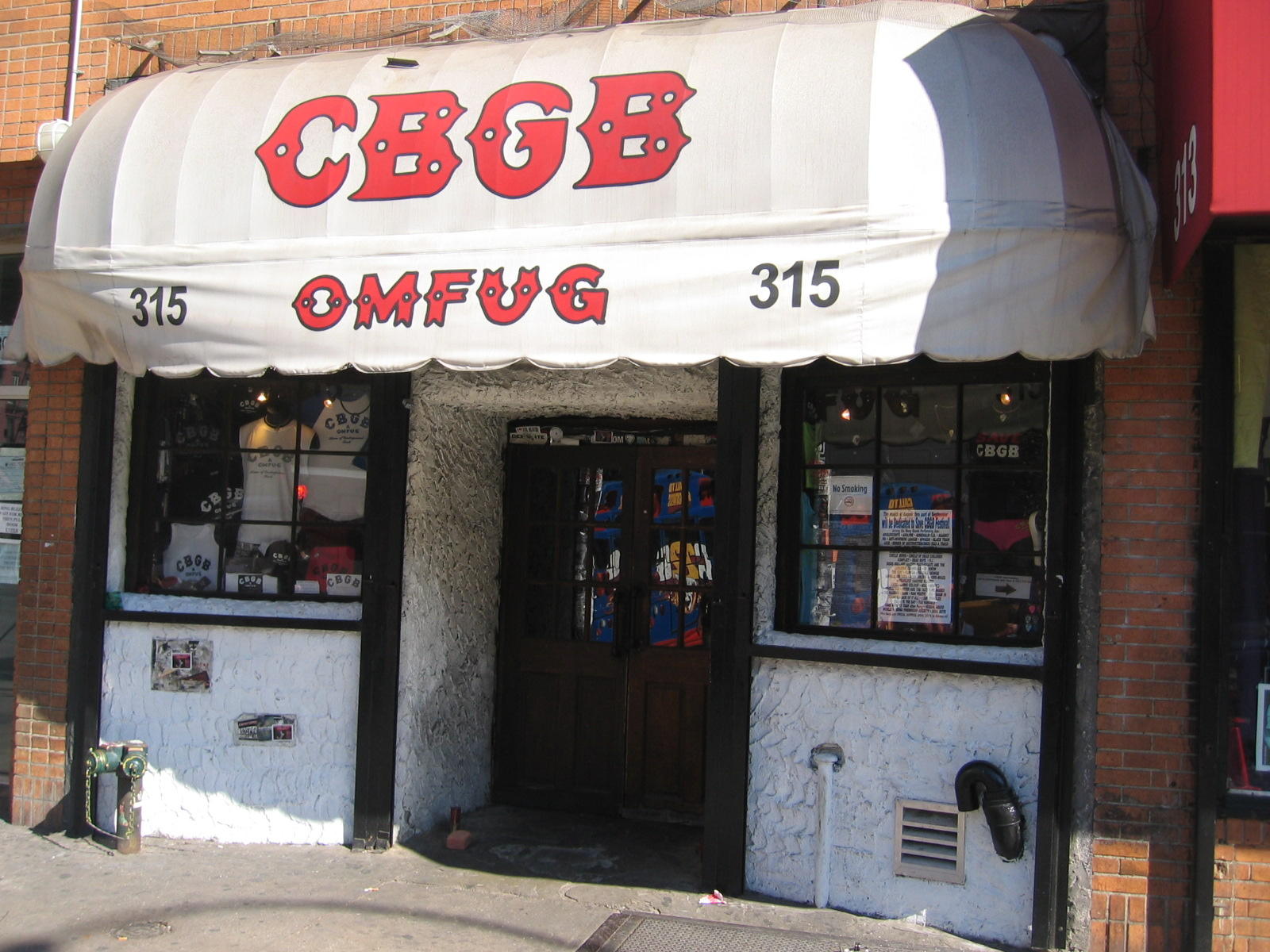
- The entrance to CBGB, c. 2005

- Location of CBGB in Manhattan, New York City CBGB (New York City) CBGB (New York)
- Location: Manhattan, New York City, U.S.
- Owner: Hilly Kristal
- Capacity: 350

Construction
- Opened: December 10, 1973; 52 years ago
- Closed: October 15, 2006; 19 years ago

Website
- www.cbgb.com
- CBGB
- U.S. Historic district – Contributing property
- Location: 315 Bowery; Manhattan, New York City, U.S.
- Coordinates: 40°43′31″N 73°59′31″W
- Built: 1878
- Part of: The Bowery Historic District (ID13000027)
- Added to NRHP: February 20, 2013

CBGB was a New York City music club opened in 1973 by Hilly Kristal and his ex-wife Karen Kristal at 315 Bowery in the East Village in Manhattan, New York City. The club was previously a biker bar and before that it was a dive bar. The letters CBGB were for Country, Bluegrass, Blues, Kristal's original vision for the club, but CBGB soon emerged as a famed and iconic venue for punk rock and new wave bands, including Poly Styrene and the X-Ray Spex, Ramones, Dead Boys, Television, Richard Hell and the Voidoids, Patti Smith Group, Blondie, and Talking Heads. The club has been identified in academic scholarship as a linchpin of early American punk culture. Histories of punk have positioned CBGB as the venue at which the genre took root in New York before its transatlantic spread to the United Kingdom.

Other bands affiliated with CBGB included Agnostic Front, Murphy's Law, U.S. Chaos, Cro-Mags, Warzone, Gorilla Biscuits, Sick of It All, and Youth of Today.

One storefront beside CBGB became the "CBGB Record Canteen", a record shop and café. In the late 1980s, "CBGB Record Canteen" was converted into an art gallery and second performance space, "CB's 313 Gallery". CB's Gallery was played by music artists of milder sounds, such as acoustic rock, folk, jazz, or experimental music, such as Dadadah, Kristeen Young, Medeski Martin & Wood and Toshi Reagon, while CBGB continued to showcase mainly hardcore punk, post punk, metal, and alternative rock.

313 Gallery was also the host location for Alchemy, a weekly Goth night showcasing goth, industrial, dark rock, and darkwave bands. On the other side, CBGB was operating a small cafe and bar in the mid-1990s, which served classic New York pizza, among other items.

Around 2000, CBGB entered a protracted dispute over allegedly unpaid rent amounts until the landlord, Bowery Residents' Committee, sued in 2005 and lost the case. Kristal and the BRC reached an agreement whereby CBGB would leave by October 31, 2006.

On October 15, 2006, the club closed with a performance by Patti Smith, who took the stage at 9:30 p.m. and played for 3 1/2 hours until slightly after 1 a.m. on October 16, 2006, closing with her song "Elegie" followed by reading a list of punk rock musicians and advocates who had died in recent years.

CBGB Radio launched on the iHeartRadio platform in 2010, and CBGB music festivals began in 2012. In 2013, CBGB's onetime building, 315 Bowery, was added to the National Register of Historic Places as part of The Bowery Historic District (not a New York City Historic District).

== Description ==
During its operating years, CBGB retained a deliberately rough interior covered in graffiti, an appearance maintained well after the club had become commercially profitable. The club's so-called greenrooms had no doors, and patrons walking to the restrooms passed through what would normally have been a backstage area, giving musicians and audience members a shared space in which to interact before and after performances.

== History ==
=== 20th century ===
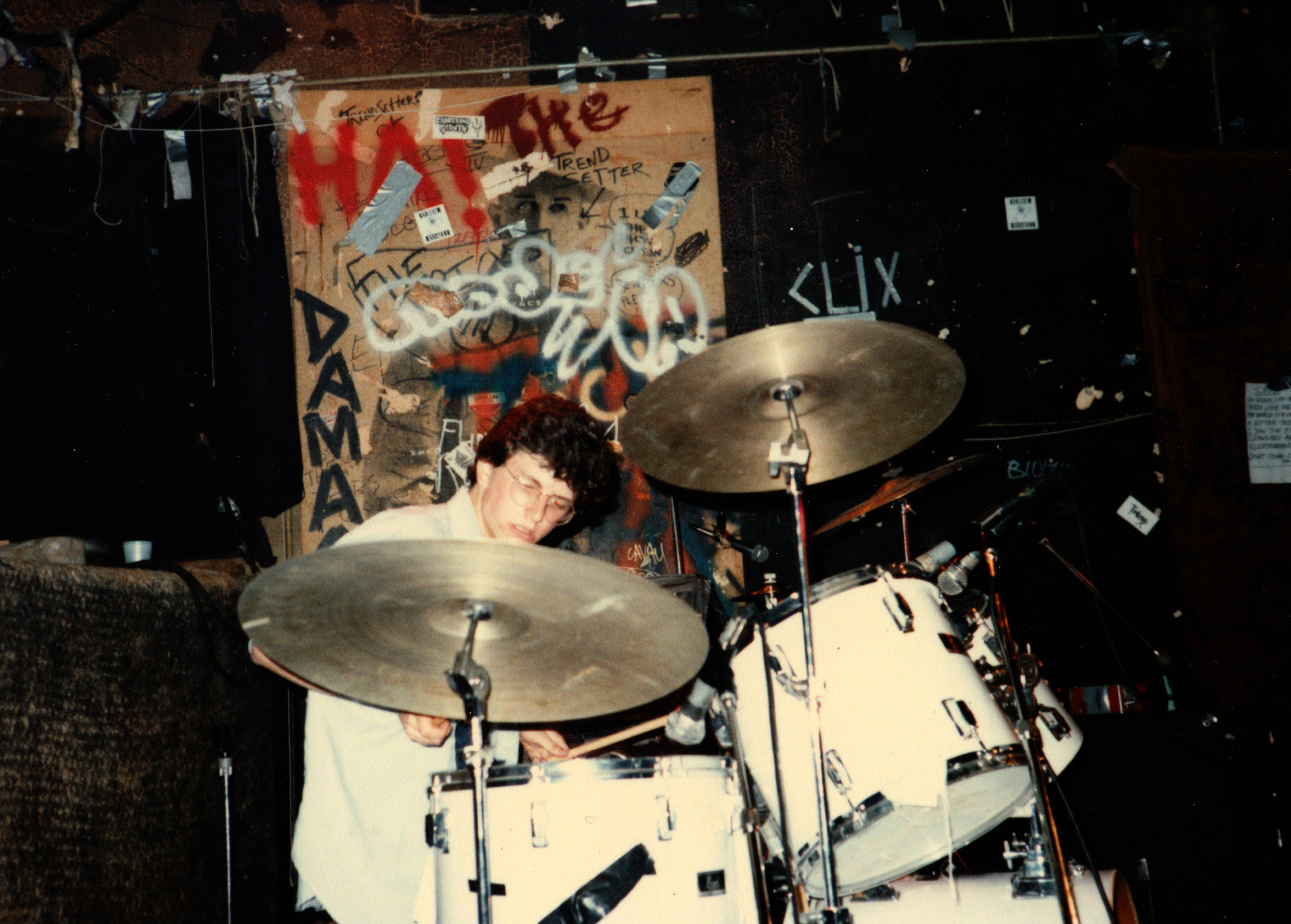
Drummer from the band Libertyville performing on the CBGB stage in January 1985

CBGB was founded on December 10, 1973, on the site of Kristal's earlier bar, Hilly's on the Bowery, which he ran from 1969 to 1972. Its iconic logo was designed by Karen Kristal. Initially, Kristal focused on his more profitable West Village nightspot, Hilly's, which Kristal closed amid complaints from the bar's neighbors. After Hilly's closure, Kristal focused on the Bowery club. Its full name of CBGB & OMFUG stands for "Country, Bluegrass, Blues, and Other Music For Uplifting Gourmandizers". Although a gourmandizer is usually a ravenous eater of food, what Kristal meant was "a voracious eater of (…) music". Kristal's intended theme of country, bluegrass, and blues music along with poetry readings yielded to the American movement in punk rock. A pioneer in the genre, Ramones played their first shows at CBGB.

In 1973, while the future CBGB was still Hilly's, two locals, Bill Page and Rusty McKenna, convinced Kristal to let them book concerts. In February 1974, Hilly booked local band Squeeze to a residency, playing Tuesdays and Wednesdays, the club's change from country and bluegrass to original rock bands. Squeeze was led by guitarist Mark Suall, later with CBGB's quasi house band the Revelons, which included Fred Smith of Television and JD Daugherty of the Patti Smith Group. Although these bands did not play punk rock, they helped lay its foundation. The August 1973 collapse of the Mercer Arts Center left unsigned bands little option in New York City to play original music. Mercer refugees—including Suicide, the Fast, Ruby and the Rednecks, Jayne County, and the Magic Tramps—soon played at CBGB.

On April 14, 1974, in the audience of Television's third gig were Patti Smith and Lenny Kaye, whose Patti Smith Group debuted at CBGB on February 14, 1975. Television had begun playing the club after Richard Hell and Tom Verlaine persuaded Kristal to give the band a Sunday-night slot, a booking that has been credited with initiating CBGB's punk era. Other early performers included the Dina Regine Band. Dennis Lepri was lead guitarist as well as the Stillettoes which included Deborah Harry on vocals. The newly formed band Angel and the Snake, later renamed Blondie, as well as Ramones arrived in August 1974. Mink DeVille, Talking Heads, the Shirts, the Heartbreakers, the Fleshtones, and other bands soon followed. During this era, media coverage was mostly provided by the SoHo Weekly News, Punk, and New York Rocker, while the more established papers such as The Village Voice and The New York Times largely stayed away.

In April 1977, the Damned played the club, marking the first time a British punk band had ever played in America.

During 1975 and 1976, Metropolis Video recorded some shows on film. Beginning in 1977, Metropolis Video filmmaker Pat Ivers and partner Emily Armstrong continued to record shows in a project called Advanced TV, later renamed GoNightclubbing. Ivers' and Armstrong's films are available at the New York University Fales Library.

CBGB's two rules were that a band must move its own equipment and play mostly original songs, although regular bands often played one or two covers in set. CBGB's growing reputation drew more and more acts from outside New York City.

In 1978, new wave songwriter Elvis Costello would open shows for the Voidoids, while the Police played at CBGB for their first American gigs. Meanwhile, CBGB became famed for Misfits, Television, Patti Smith Group, Mink DeVille, Dead Boys, the Dictators, the Fleshtones, the Voidoids, the Cramps, the B-52's, Blondie, Joan Jett & the Blackhearts, the Shirts, Dirty Looks and Talking Heads. Yet in the 1980s, hardcore punk's New York underground was CBGB's mainstay. Named "thrash day" in a documentary on hardcore, Sunday at CBGB was matinée day, which became an institution, played from afternoon until evening by hardcore bands such as Reagan Youth, Bad Brains, Beastie Boys, Agnostic Front, Murphy's Law, Cro-Mags, Leeway, Warzone, Gorilla Biscuits, Sick of It All, Misfits, Sheer Terror, Stillborn and Youth of Today.

In 1990, violence inside and outside of the venue prompted Kristal to suspend hardcore bookings, although CBGB brought hardcore back at times. CBGB's last several years had no formal bans by genre.

=== 21st century ===
In 2005, atop its normally paid monthly rent of $19,000, CBGB was sued for some $90,000 in rent allegedly owed to its landlord, Bowery Residents' Committee (BRC). Refusing to pay until a judge ruled the debt legitimate, Kristal claimed that he had never been notified of scaled rent increases, accruing over a number of years, asserted by BRC's executive director Muzzy Rosenblatt. Ruling the debt false and that BRC had never properly billed the rent increases, the judge indicated that CBGB ought to be declared a landmark, but noted that Rosenblatt did not need to renew the lease, soon expiring. Rosenblatt vowed to appeal.

Expecting Rosenblatt's resistance to lease negotiation, Kristal agreed that the rent ought to rise, but not to the $55,000 monthly that Kristal believed the BRC to want.

A nonprofit corporation housing homeless above CBGB mostly through donations and government funding, the BRC had only one commercial tenant and raised its monthly rent to $35,000. Kristal and the BRC reached an agreement whereby CBGB would leave by September 30, 2006. Planning to move CBGB to Las Vegas, Kristal explained, "We're going to take the urinals. I'll take whatever I can. The movers said, 'You ought to take everything, and auction off what you don't want on eBay.' Why not? Somebody will".

==== Closure ====
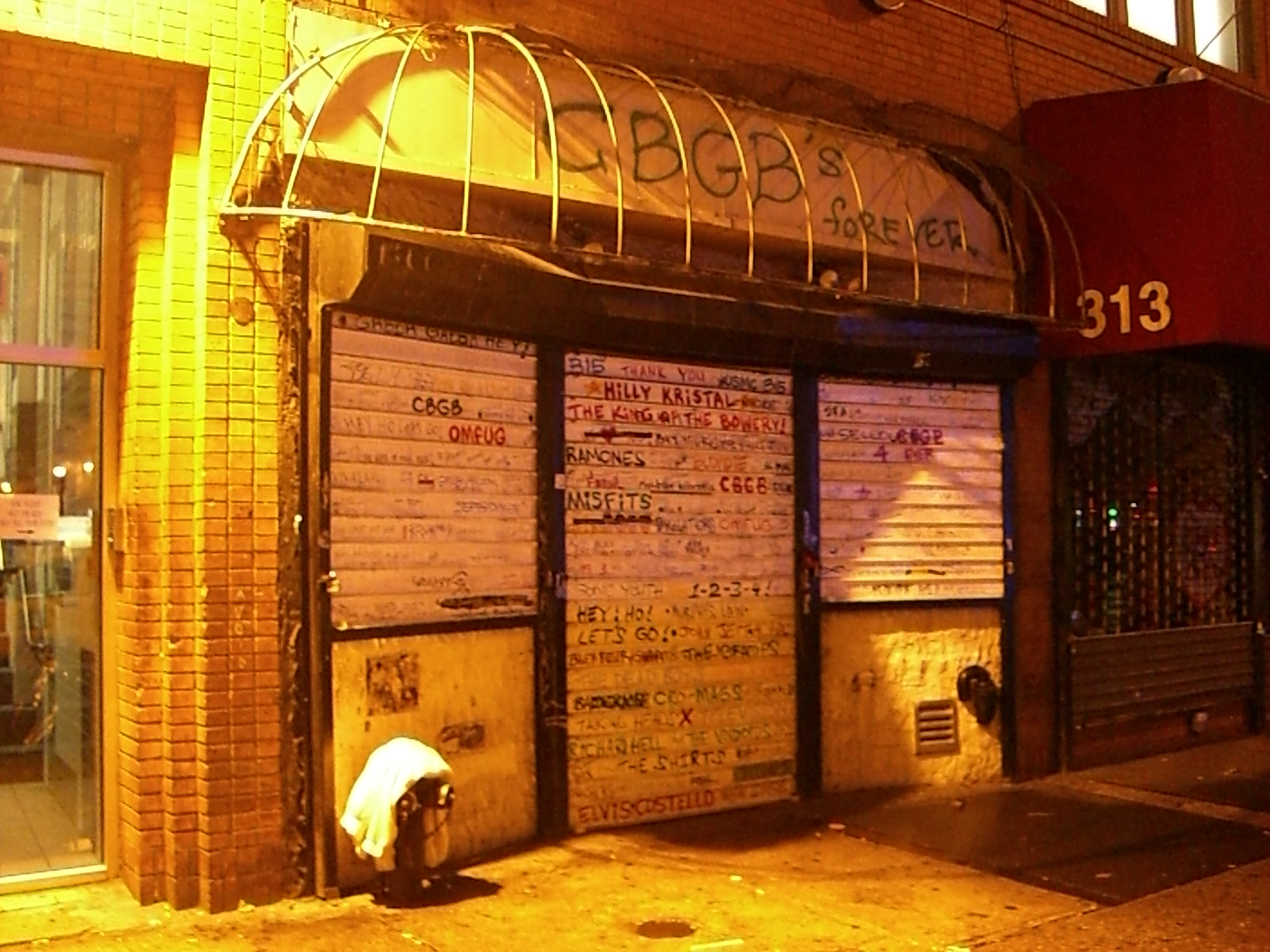
The exterior of CBGB on October 15, 2006, the day it closed

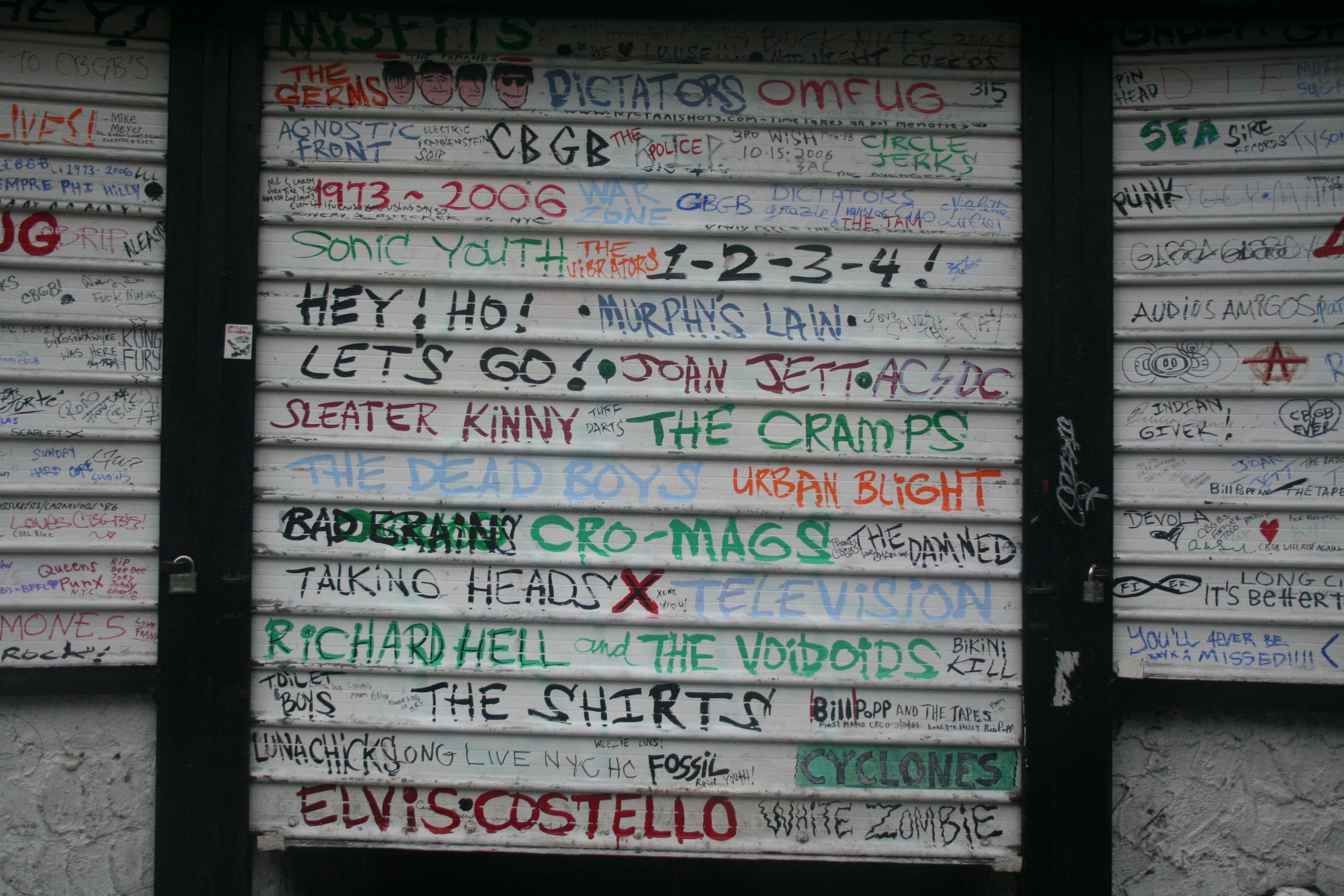
The exterior of CBGB on October 16, 2006, the day after it closed

Many punk rock bands played at CBGB when they found it was going to close in hopes that their support could keep it from closing. Rocks Off, a promoter in New York, organized CBGB's final weeks of shows to book "many of the artists who made CB's famous". Avail, the Bouncing Souls, and such newer acts opened during the last week, which included multi-night stands by Bad Brains and the Dictators and an acoustic set by Blondie. The final show, broadcast live on Sirius Satellite Radio on October 15, was played by Patti Smith, helped on some songs by Flea of the Red Hot Chili Peppers. Television's Richard Lloyd, too, played in a few, including "Marquee Moon". Nearly finished, Smith and band playing "Gloria" alternated the chorus with echoes of "Blitzkrieg Bop" by the Ramones—Hey! Ho! Let's go!. During "Elegie", her final encore, Smith named musicians and other music figures who had died since playing at CBGB. On October 15, 2006, upon Patti Smith's last show at CBGB, the storied bar and club closed.

==== Aftermath ====
After closing, the old CBGB venue remained open as CBGB Fashions—retail store, wholesale department, and an online store—until October 31, 2006. CBGB Fashions moved to 19–23 St. Mark's Place on November 1, and closed nearly two years later in summer 2008.

Hilly Kristal died from complications of lung cancer on August 28, 2007. In early October, Kristal's family and friends hosted a private memorial service in the nearby YMCA. Soon, there was a public memorial, contributed to by CBGB onetime staff and by others.

Kristal's ex-wife Karen Kristal and his daughter, Lisa Kristal Burgman, battled legally over the purported $3 million CBGB estate, and settled in June 2009 with Burgman receiving most of the money left after payment of creditors and estate taxes. In 2011, a group of unknown investors bought the remaining CBGB assets, including the associated intellectual property and original interior. The location is now occupied by John Varvatos fashions.

In December 2015, various news outlets reported on a rebranded CBGB "reopening" at Newark International Airport as CBGB L.A.B. (Lounge and Bar) by New York chef Harold Moore, which had opened as of the end of December 2015.

== Subsequent occupants ==
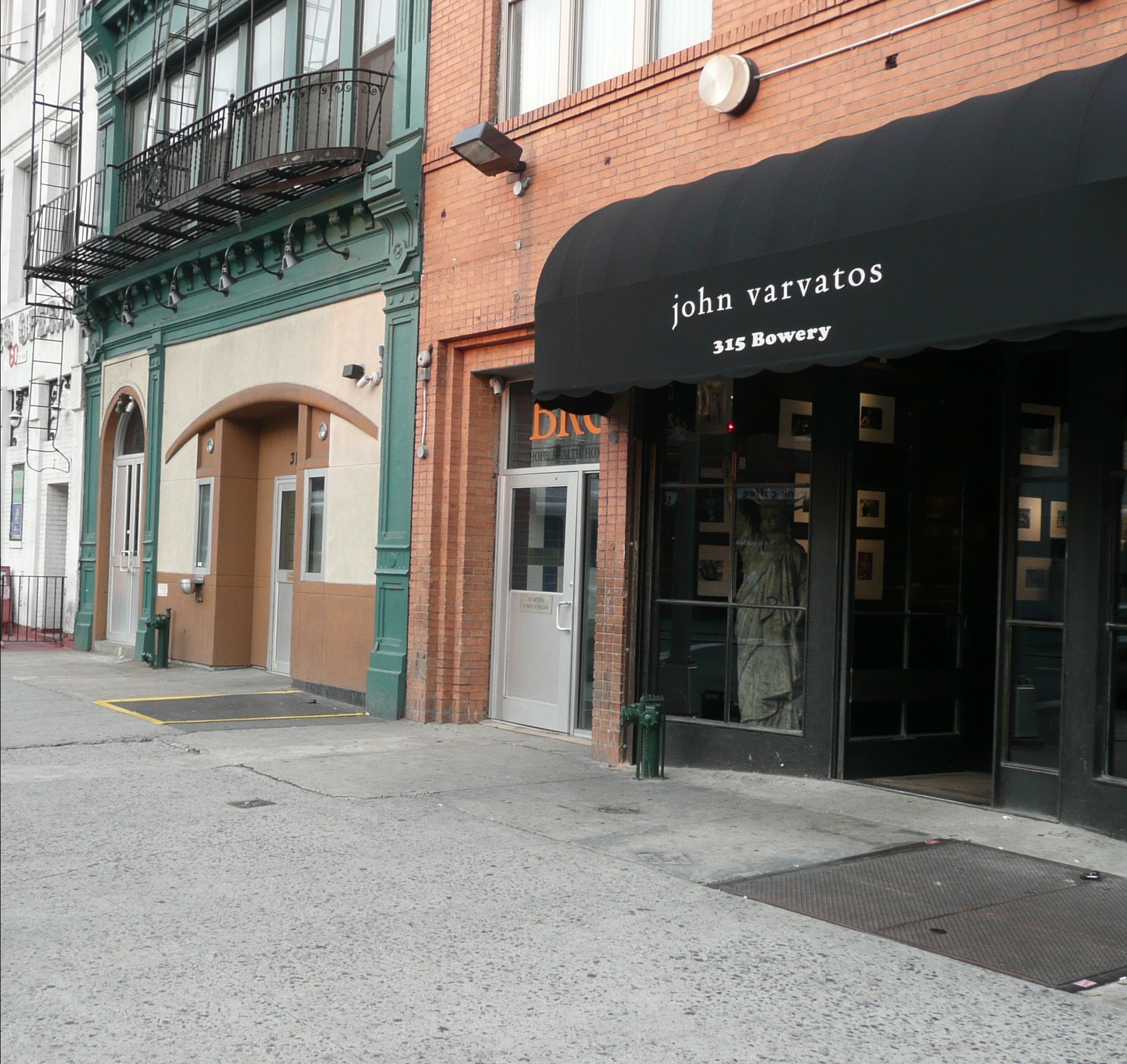
The John Varvatos store on the site where CBGB used to stand

By late 2007, fashion designer John Varvatos planned to open a store in CBGB's former space, 315 Bowery, but to tastefully trail CBGB's legacy rock and roll stickers on the walls, and much of the graffiti at the toilets was preserved, as were some playbills, found behind a wall, from shows at the club's 10th anniversary in 1983. The store opened in April 2008. John Varvatos sells t-shirts with the original CBGB and OMFUG logo and font from the CBGB awning.

In 2008, a SoHo art gallery dedicated to music photography, the Morrison Hotel, opened a second location in the onetime CBGB Gallery at 313 Bowery, but the Morrison Hotel gallery closed in 2011. The space was then occupied by a surf-oriented Patagonia store until late 2021. Amanita gallery subsequently moved in at 313 Bowery in 2022.

Called the "Extra Place", the alley behind the building became a pedestrian mall. Dead Boys' Cheetah Chrome rued, "All of Manhattan has lost its soul to money lords", yet reflected, "If that alley could talk, it's seen it all". CBGB's nomination as a landmark drew an explanation:

CBGB was founded in 1973 at 315 Bowery, in a former nineteenth-century saloon on the first floor of the Palace Lodging House. The legendary music venue fostered new genres of American music, including punk and art rock, that defined the culture of downtown Manhattan in the 1970s, and that still resonate today. In this role as cultural incubator, CBGB served the same function as the theatres and concert halls of the Bowery's storied past. The former club, now occupied by a retail business, remains a pilgrimage site for legions of music fans.

== Legacy ==
CBGB's second awning, the one in place when the club closed in 2006, was moved into the lobby of the Rock and Roll Hall of Fame in Cleveland.

The CBGB Festival produced large free concerts in Times Square and Central Park on July 7, 2012. They also showcased hundreds of bands in venues across the city. The festival premiered dozens of rock-n-roll movies in theaters around Manhattan. A new CBGB Festival was announced to take place at Under the K Bridge Park in Brooklyn on September 27, 2025.

Directed by Randall Miller and starring Alan Rickman as Hilly Kristal, the film CBGB, about Kristal and the origins of the club, was released on October 11, 2013, and received largely negative reviews.

=== Appearances, mentions and parodies ===
- CBGB was in a promotional ad aired during New York City's bid to host the 2012 Olympic Games.
- CBGB appears in the 2010 rhythm game Guitar Hero: Warriors of Rock.
- In The Shapers' song "Old School Punk Star", the venue is referenced in the bridge: "...and to rock on at the CBGB ..."
- Rapper Aesop Rock mentions CBGB in his song "Shrunk", "Telephone uncovered by purveyors of the Ouija/Then checked against the CBGB women's room graffiti"
- The Wheatus song "Christmas Dirtbag" mentions CBGB, "...Aftershow party at CBGB..."
- Talking Heads mention CBGB in the song "Life During Wartime", "This ain't no Mudd Club, or C.B.G.B."
- The Heads, a spin-off band of Talking Heads, mentions CBGB in their song "Punk Lolita," off their album No Talking, Just Head; "She was a punk Lolita, C.B.G.B. era."
- LCD Soundsystem's 2002 debut single "Losing My Edge" references CBGB, "I was the first guy playing Daft Punk to the rock kids. I played it at CBGB's. Everybody thought I was crazy".
- Season 4 episode 11 of Gilmore Girls, titled "In the Clamor and the Clangor," features a subplot in which the character Lane Kim and her band Hep Alien get a gig at CBGB. Lane and her bandmates are ecstatic about this opportunity, believing it is their big break, citing several bands who got their start at the club.
- The season 19 The Simpsons episode "Love, Springfieldian Style" features a punk bar called CBGB, where it stands for "Comic Book Guy's Bar".
- The bar is parodied in Mort the Dead Teenager as "ABCD's", where the main characters play in the third issue. Creators Larry Hama and Gary Hallgren performed at CBGB alongside other New York-area comic artists and writers with their band The K-Otics in the late 80s to early 90s.

== See also ==
- CBGB's and the Birth of U.S. Punk
- Max's Kansas City
- New wave music
- Punk rock
