= Night of the Living Dead Boys =

1981 live album by Dead Boys

Live album by Dead Boys
- Released: 1981
- Recorded: March 1979
- Venue: CBGB
- Genre: Punk rock
- Length: 39:08
- Label: Bomp!
- Producers: Greg Shaw, Stiv Bators

Dead Boys chronology
We Have Come for Your Children (1978)	Night of the Living Dead Boys (1981)	The Return of the Living Dead Boys (1987)

Night of the Living Dead Boys is a 1981 live album by the American punk rock band Dead Boys. It was recorded in March 1979 at CBGB. Since Stiv Bators purposely did not sing into the microphone at this show, the vocals were overdubbed later, causing mixed opinions on this album.

The album was released on CD in two editions, which are significantly different. The first edition, with the "glam" cover (not illustrated in this article) had the original song order reshuffled, with poorly done fade-outs and fade-ins. This edition also came with a second section, a reunion show with (at least) Stiv Bators and Cheetah Chrome present, from 1987. This edition also had extensive liner notes detailing Bators' trick of singing off-mike, and claims he re-recorded the entire album in one take, from memory, while drunk and in the booth with two groupies.

The second CD issue of Night of the Living Dead Boys had the original album artwork - from the front anyway, though not the photo collage on the back - along with the original, unedited, uninterrupted song order. This edition is more "pure," containing only the original album, with no extra material, printed or auditory. While some may prefer the earlier issue with its reunion show and interesting reading, only this second version is true to the original.

== Track listing ==
No.	Title	Writer(s)	Length
1.	"Detention Home"	Stiv Bators, Cheetah Chrome	3:41
2.	"3rd Generation Nation"	Bators	2:38
3.	"All This and More"	Jimmy Zero	3:05
4.	"Caught with the Meat in Your Mouth"	Bators, Chrome	2:06
5.	"Tell Me"	Mick Jagger, Keith Richards	2:36
6.	"Catholic Boy"	Bators	2:43
7.	"I Won't Look Back"	Zero	2:16
8.	"Ain't It Fun"	Peter Laughner, Cheetah Chrome	4:31
9.	"What Love Is"	Bators, Chrome	2:02
10.	"Ain't Nothin' to Do"	Bators, Chrome	2:27
11.	"I Need Lunch"	Bators, Zero	3:31
12.	"Son of Sam"	Zero	4:46
13.	"Sonic Reducer"	Chrome, David Thomas	2:46
Total length:			39:08

== Personnel ==
Dead Boys

- Stiv Bators – vocals
- Cheetah Chrome – guitar
- Jimmy Zero – guitar
- Jeff Magnum – bass
- Johnny Blitz – drums
