= New Wave (compilation album) =

Compilation album
- Released: 1977
- Recorded: 1973–1977
- Genre: Punk rock; new wave; proto-punk
- Length: 48:13
- Label: Vertigo

New Wave is a notable punk/new wave/proto-punk compilation album released in 1977 on Vertigo Records. It introduced many US new wave artists to the UK market and helped establish the term "new wave". The album was compiled by Alan Cowderoy for Phonogram Ltd. (London) and most of the artists were on Phonogram subsidiary labels, making it essentially a sampler album. The album credits give thanks to Linda and Seymour Stein from Sire Records and Jake Riviera and Kosmo Vinyl from Stiff Records. Music critic Ira Robbins rated it one of his top ten albums of 1977.

While most of the acts on the album were US acts, it also included acts from the UK (the Damned), Ireland (the Boomtown Rats), France (Little Bob Story) and Australia (Skyhooks).

The front cover depicts a punk spitting beer. The punk in the photo is Derek Gibbs, vocalist for the London-based punk band the Satellites. Also seen in the background of the photo is the Satellites' bass player, John Johnson. The rear cover has 11 photos of punks posing in colourful clothing. All the photos were taken by Peter 'Kodick' Gravelle who was one of the first punk photographers, shooting record sleeve photos for the Damned, Generation X, Skrewdriver, Chelsea and others.

== Credits ==
- Compiled By – Alan Cowderoy
- Photography By – Peter Kodick
- Sleeve – Dennis Walden, Sue Dubois

== Track listing ==
Side 1
No.	Title	Writer(s)	Artist	Length
1.	"Judy Is a Punk"	Ramones	Ramones (from 1976 Sire album Ramones)	1:29
2.	"Sonic Reducer"	Cheetah Chrome, Dave Thomas	Dead Boys (from 1977 Sire album Young, Loud and Snotty)	3:04
3.	"Piss Factory"	Patti Smith, Richard Sohl	Patti Smith (b-side to 1974 Mer/Sire single "Hey Joe")	4:41
4.	"Personality Crisis"	David Johansen, Johnny Thunders	New York Dolls (from 1973 Mercury album New York Dolls)	3:40
5.	"Hollywood"	Jackie Fox, Joan Jett, Kim Fowley	The Runaways (from 1977 Mercury album Queens of Noise)	2:55
6.	"Horror Movie"	Greg Macainsh	Skyhooks (from 1974 Mushroom album Living in the 70's)	3:30
7.	"Love Comes in Spurts"	Richard Hell	Richard Hell and the Voidoids (from 1977 Sire album Blank Generation)	1:56
8.	"All or Nothing"	Ronnie Lane, Steve Marriott	Little Bob Story (1977 Mercury single, from Living in the Fast Lane album)	3:14

Side 2
No.	Title	Writer(s)	Artist	Length
1.	"Lookin' After No. 1"	Bob Geldof	The Boomtown Rats (from 1977 Ensign album The Boomtown Rats)	3:07
2.	"Love Goes to Building on Fire"	David Byrne	Talking Heads (1977 Sire single)	2:57
3.	"New Rose"	Brian James	The Damned (from 1977 Stiff album Damned Damned Damned)	2:41
4.	"Suzy is a Headbanger"	Ramones	Ramones (from 1977 Sire album Leave Home)	2:12
5.	"All This and More"	Jimmy Zero	Dead Boys (from 1977 Sire album Young, Loud and Snotty)	2:49
6.	"Shake Some Action"	Chris Wilson, Cyril Jordan	The Flamin' Groovies (from 1976 Sire album Shake Some Action)	4:30
7.	"Cherry Bomb"	Joan Jett, Kim Fowley	The Runaways (from 1976 Mercury album The Runaways)	2:17
8.	"Who Are the Mystery Girls?"	David Johansen, Johnny Thunders	New York Dolls (from 1974 Mercury album Too Much Too Soon)	3:11
