= Still Snotty: Young, Loud and Snotty at 40 =

Studio album by Dead Boys
- Released: September 8, 2017
- Recorded: 2017
- Genre: Punk rock
- Label: Plowboy Records

Dead Boys chronology
3rd Generation Nation (1999)	Still Snotty: Young, Loud and Snotty at 40 (2017)

Still Snotty: Young, Loud and Snotty at 40 is an album by the American punk band Dead Boys. It marks the band's third studio album and is a re-recording of the band's 1977 debut album Young, Loud and Snotty. It is the first album of newly recorded music by the band in 39 years.

== Background ==
In July 2017, founding members Cheetah Chrome (lead guitar) and Johnny Blitz (drums) announced that they were reforming the band with a new lineup for a re-recording of the debut album and a 40th anniversary tour for the album. The tour marks the first time the band has toured since 1979. Jake Hout replaces Stiv Bators (who died in 1990), on lead vocals while Jason Kottwitz replaces Jimmy Zero on rhythm guitar and Ricky Rat replaces Jeff Magnum on bass.

== Track listing ==
All tracks composed by Stiv Bators, Cheetah Chrome & Jimmy Zero (Copyright Omfug Music/Dead Boys Music/Bleu Disque Music-ASCAP); except where indicated

1. "Sonic Reducer" (David Thomas, Cheetah Chrome) – 3:00
2. "All This and More" – 2:51
3. "What Love Is" – 2:17
4. "Not Anymore" – 3:37
5. "Ain't Nothin' to Do" – 2:23
6. "Caught with the Meat in Your Mouth" – 2:07
7. "I Need Lunch" – 3:40
8. "High Tension Wire" – 2:58
9. "Down in Flames" – 2:04

== Personnel ==
Dead Boys

- Cheetah Chrome - lead guitar
- Johnny Blitz - drums
- Jason Kottwitz - guitar
- Ricky Rat - bass
- Jake Hout - vocals
