= Disconnected (Stiv Bators album) =

Studio album by Stiv Bators
- Released: December 1980
- Recorded: August–September 1980
- Studios: Perspective Studios, Sun Valley, Los Angeles
- Genre: Power pop
- Label: Bomp!
- Producers: Thom Wilson; Stiv Bators

Stiv Bators chronology
Disconnected (1980)	Live at the Limelight (1988)

Singles from Disconnected
- 1. "Too Much to Dream" Released: 1980

Professional ratings
Review scores
Source	Rating
AllMusic	3/5 stars
Christgau's Record Guide	B
PopMatters	favourable
Trouser Press	favourable

Disconnected is the debut solo album by Stiv Bators, released in December 1980 on Bomp!. The album is a radical departure from the punk rock sound of his previous band the Dead Boys, and sees Bators venturing into 1960s-inspired power pop.

Describing the album, Mike Stax of music magazine Ugly Things wrote that the album was "a surprisingly melodic power-pop effort" and that it showed the affinity Bators had for British Invasion-inspired 1960s garage rock and pop music, "favouring ringing Rickenbacker power chords and tough but harmonious backing vocals."

== Background ==
After the disbandment of the Dead Boys in 1979, Stiv Bators had begun to look for other projects, wanting to do something different musically. He decided to move from the East to the West Coast and settled in Los Angeles. He contacted his old friend bassist Frank Secich, formerly of Blue Ash, and the two started writing songs together and recording demos during early 1979. The songwriting showed a strong 1960s influence, as Secich explained: "Stiv was a huge fan of American garage and power pop. He loved it."

Bators then went to Los Angeles with his girlfriend Cynthia Ross, whose band the B-Girls was signed to Bomp! Records, and played the demos for Bomp! founder Greg Shaw. Liking what he heard, Shaw offered Bators a contract in spring 1979. Bators and Secich (working under the alias Jeff Jones) had now assembled a band including guitarist Eddy Best and drummer Rick Bremmer. Their first Stiv Bators solo single release, a cover version of the Choir's "It's Cold Outside", was backed by the selfwritten B-side "The Last Year" and released in May. A few months later, with new drummer David Quinton, they recorded the follow-up single "Not That Way Anymore" b/w "Circumstantial Evidence", which was released in January 1980. Both singles were produced by Bators and Secich as the Gutter Twins.

In October 1979, the Dead Boys was set to go on tour again with their original line-up, including Bators. When Dead Boys bassist Jeff Magnum reconsidered at the last moment, Secich was called to replace him for the tour. It lasted until December, when guitarist Cheetah Chrome broke his wrist and was replaced by George Cabaniss. This line-up of the Dead Boys toured North America for the next six months, all the while promoting Stiv Bator's solo singles. Drummer Johnny Blitz left the band in May 1980 to be replaced by David Quinton, followed by guitarist Jimmy Zero's departure in the summer. With a recording date set in August at Perspective Studios in Sun Valley, California, the personnel for what would become Disconnected consisted of the last touring line-up of the Dead Boys: Stiv Bators, Frank Secich, George Cabaniss and David Quinton.

Most of the basic tracks for the album were recorded on a basketball court next to the studio, due to its wooden floor having an "extremely "live" sound", according to Secich. "We generally slept through the days and worked through the night", said David Quinton. "The whole process took about 2 weeks. There wasn’t a lot of planning or pre-production. Decisions on arrangements and overdubs were made quickly on the spot and the mood was usually upbeat." Co-produced by Thom Wilson and Stiv Bators, the album marked Wilson's first time as a producer. All band members contributed material for Disconnected, with Bators only co-writing three of the album's nine tracks. One track, "Evil Boy", had been co-written by Secich and Jimmy Zero during the Dead Boys tour that summer. The album also included the single "Too Much to Dream", originally recorded by the Electric Prunes in 1966. Disconnected was released by Bomp! in December 1980.

When the album was released in December, Bators did a three-week tour of the Northeastern United States with former Damned guitarist Brian James in the band. Quinton: "We actually toured quite a bit in 1980/1981. ... We always did a combination of Dead Boys songs with the Disconnected stuff and other Stiv solo material, like "Circumstantial Evidence" and "Not that Way Anymore"."

Secich: "Just before we released Disconnected Stiv went to England to record with the Wanderers. He wanted to have both groups going at the same time, but the rest of us didn't…so that's how it wound down. It was just impossible to do both." The Disconnected band ended in early 1981.

== Track listing ==
No.	Title	Writer(s)	Length
1.	"Evil Boy"	Frank Secich, Jimmy Zero	3:18
2.	"Bad Luck Charm"	David Quinton, George Cabaniss	3:36
3.	"A Million Miles Away"	Secich	4:26
4.	"Make Up Your Mind"	Quinton	2:22
5.	"Swingin' a Go-Go"	Cabaniss	2:27
6.	"Too Much to Dream"	Annette Tucker, Nancy Mantz	2:47
7.	"Ready Any Time"	Stiv Bators, Secich	3:00
8.	"The Last Year"	Bators, Secich	3:27
9.	"I Wanna Forget You (Just the Way You Are)"	Bators, Secich	4:27

1987 reissue bonus tracks
No.	Title	Writer(s)	Length
10.	"Circumstantial Evidence" (Single, 1980)	Bators, Jeff Jones
11.	"It's Cold Outside" (Single, 1979)	Dan Klawon

1993 reissue bonus tracks
No.	Title	Writer(s)	Length
10.	"Sonic Reducer" (Live at Berkeley Square, May 15, 1980)	Cheetah Chrome, David Thomas
11.	"It's Cold Outside" (Live at Berkeley Square, May 15, 1980)	Klawon
12.	"I Stand Accused" (Live at Berkeley Square, May 15, 1980)	Warren Levine
13.	"Tell Me" (Live at Berkeley Square, May 15, 1980)	Mick Jagger, Keith Richards
14.	"Little Girl" (Live at Berkeley Square, May 15, 1980)	Don Baskin, Bob Gonzalez
15.	"Won't Look Back" (Live at Berkeley Square, May 15, 1980)	Zero
16.	"Evil Boy" (Live at Berkeley Square, May 15, 1980)	Secich, Zero
17.	"I Need Lunch" (Live at Berkeley Square, May 15, 1980)	Bators, Chrome, Zero

2004 reissue bonus tracks
No.	Title	Writer(s)	Length
10.	"Evil Boy" (Alternate take)	Secich, Zero
11.	"Swingin' a Go-Go" (Alternate take)	Cabaniss
12.	"Crime in the Streets" (Instrumental)	Secich, Cabaniss, Quinton
13.	"Little Girl" (Live at the Agora Ballroom, May 24, 1980)	Baskin, Gonzalez
14.	"Junebug Skillet (Barbecued Yardbird)" (Prank telephone call)

== Personnel ==
Credits adapted from the album's liner notes.

- Stiv Bators – vocals
- Frank Secich – bass, backing vocals
- George Cabaniss (credited as Georgie Harrison) – guitar, backing vocals
- David Quinton – drums, piano, backing vocals
- The B-Girls – backing vocals and handclaps on "Swingin' a Go-Go"

Technical

- Stiv Bators – producer, cover concept
- Thom Wilson – producer, engineer
- Gary Cooper – assistant engineer
- Phil Singer – assistant engineer
- Diane Zincavage – design
- David Arnoff – front cover photography
- Theresa Kereakes – back cover and sleeve photography
- Paul Grant – typography
- Greg Shaw – executive producer
