= CBGB (film) =

2013 film by Randall Miller

- Theatrical release poster
- Directed by: Randall Miller
- Written by: Jody Savin; Randall Miller
- Based on: Life of Hilly Kristal
- Produced by: Jody Savin; Randall Miller; Brad Rosenberger
- Starring: Alan Rickman; Malin Åkerman; Justin Bartha; Richard de Klerk; Kyle Gallner; Johnny Galecki; Ashley Greene; Rupert Grint; Estelle Harris; Taylor Hawkins; Ryan Hurst; Stana Katic; Donal Logue; Joel David Moore; Ahna O'Reilly; Freddy Rodriguez; Mickey Sumner; Bradley Whitford; Josh Zuckerman
- Cinematography: Michael J. Ozier
- Edited by: Dan O'Brien
- Production company: Unclaimed Freight Productions
- Distributed by: XLrator Media
- Release dates: September 5, 2013 (VOD premiere); October 4, 2013 (United States)
- Running time: 101 minutes
- Country: United States
- Language: English
- Budget: $5 million
- Box office: $40,400

CBGB is a 2013 American biographical drama film about the former New York music venue CBGB. It follows the story of Hilly Kristal's New York club from its concept as a venue for Country, Bluegrass and Blues (CBGB) to what it ultimately became: the birthplace of underground rock 'n' roll and punk. The film uses devices such as comic book-style panels, as well as onscreen text to identify important figures in the punk movement.

== Plot ==
In 1970s New York City, Hilly Kristal is divorced, with two children and has filed bankruptcy for the second time. Despite setbacks, he is determined to own and manage a bar. With his business partner Merv Ferguson, Kristal convinces his mother to lend them the money needed to establish the dive bar CBGB, which Kristal intends to make into a country music venue.

The business gets off to a rocky start as there are few customers and Kristal has difficulty finding country acts. However, a rock band called Television arrives at the bar and auditions. Seeing potential, Kristal books them. CBGB soon becomes a rock venue that caters to the burgeoning punk movement. New acts such as Blondie, Patti Smith, Talking Heads, and The Ramones begin to get noticed by playing at the club. The fledgling fanzine Punk also gets its start by reporting on the bands and debating the movement's ideology (or lack thereof). Despite CBGB's newfound success, Kristal poorly manages the club's funds (he keeps the money in his apartment freezer) and fails to regularly pay bills or rent, and gives out copious amounts of free drinks. Kristal's daughter Lisa tries to take over the chaotic finances in an attempt to save the business.

After The Ramones are signed to Sire Records, Kristal decides to manage CBGB regulars The Dead Boys. Lisa warns Kristal that he can't financially afford to take on a band. Kristal ignores her, as well as others who caution him about The Dead Boys' destructive and anti-social behavior. While on tour, the band crashes and totals their truck and equipment, leaving Kristal and CBGB broke. This leads to Ferguson threatening to leave the business for good, which Kristal doesn't believe. Soon afterwards, The Dead Boys gets into a fight with a group of thugs and their drummer, Johnny Blitz, is stabbed multiple times and barely survives.

Despondent and penniless, Kristal announces to his employees that CBGB will be closing. Ferguson and Lisa reveal that they have made many calls to grateful friends whom Kristal helped in the past. They've scraped together enough money to stay open long enough to stabilize the situation. The film ends with The Police auditioning for Kristal.

The epilogue reveals that CBGB remained open until 2006. Kristal remains an important figure in the history of punk and rock and roll. Lisa went on to become a lawyer. Ferguson always wore a yellow construction helmet and no one ever knew why. Kristal continued to manage The Dead Boys until they broke up in 1979. The epilogue closes by stating Kristal's dog, Jonathan, had legendary bowels since he was known for defecating wherever he pleased inside the club. Over the final credits, the real-life Talking Heads' acceptance speech during the 2002 Rock and Roll Hall of Fame Induction Ceremony is played, during which they invite Kristal to the stage and thank him for his support.

== Cast ==
- Alan Rickman as Hilly Kristal
- Ashley Greene as Lisa Kristal
- Malin Åkerman as Debbie Harry
- Freddy Rodriguez as Idaho
- Ryan Hurst as Mad Mountain
- Stana Katic as Genya Ravan
- Richard de Klerk as Taxi
- Rupert Grint as Cheetah Chrome
- Justin Bartha as Stiv Bators
- Bronson C. Adams as Johnny Blitz
- Joel David Moore as Joey Ramone
- Josh Zuckerman as John Holmstrom
- Kyle Gallner as Lou Reed
- Johnny Galecki as Terry Ork
- Donal Logue as Merv Ferguson
- Taylor Hawkins as Iggy Pop
- Mickey Sumner as Patti Smith
- Caleb McCotter as Wayne County
- Bradley Whitford as Nicky Gant
- Peter Vack as Legs McNeil
- Estelle Harris as Bertha Kristal
- Michael Massee as Officer Stan
- Christian Parker Gant as Baby Hilly

== Release ==
CBGB premiered on DirecTV's video on demand platform "DirecTV Cinema" on September 5, 2013, and was available through October 2, 2013, in standard and high-definition formats (including "Yekra", an all-new independent film streaming and social distribution site). Following a national release in select theaters beginning October 4, 2013, it was shown at various times throughout the CBGB Music & Film Festival in New York City from October 9 through October 13, 2013. The DVD and Blu-ray were scheduled for release on December 31, 2013.

== Reception ==
=== Box office ===
CBGB made its theatrical premiere on October 4, 2013, and grossed $3,909 at the box office its opening weekend from one theater. The film then began its wide release in select theaters October 4, 2013. The total U.S. theatrical gross for the film was $40,400.

=== Critical response ===
The film has been panned by critics. On the review aggregator website Rotten Tomatoes, 7% of 43 critics' reviews are positive, with an average rating of 3.4/10. The site's critics consensus simply reads: "Hey! Ho! No no!". At Metacritic, the film has received an average score of 30 out of 100, based on 17 reviews from mainstream critics, indicating "generally unfavorable" reviews.

Robert Abele of the Los Angeles Times called it "merely a mess of caricatures". Likewise, Brian McManus of The Village Voice writes: "CBGB's biggest problem is that it's taken such electrifying source material and done absolutely zilch with it."

== Soundtrack ==
CBGB: Original Motion Picture Soundtrack

Soundtrack album by various artists
- Released: October 8, 2013
- Length: 63:59
- Labels: Omnivore; Universal

Professional ratings
Review scores
Source	Rating
AllMusic	3.5/5 stars
Rolling Stone	3/5 stars

The soundtrack was released on October 8, 2013. It is available on CD, Vinyl and as a digital download. The first pressing Omnivore released of the soundtrack is a double album on translucent pink vinyl. Rhino released a deluxe digital version with additional tracks on the same day.

CBGB: Original Motion Picture Soundtrack – Standard edition
No.	Title	Performed by	Length
1.	"Life During Wartime"	Talking Heads	3:41
2.	"Kick Out the Jams" (uncensored version)	MC5	2:52
3.	"Chatterbox"	New York Dolls	2:26
4.	"Careful"	Television	3:17
5.	"Blank Generation"	Richard Hell and the Voidoids	2:44
6.	"Slow Death"	Flamin' Groovies	4:23
7.	"I Can't Stand It"	The Velvet Underground	3:21
8.	"Out of Control" (the featured track from the album)	Wayne County & the Electric Chairs	3:53
9.	"Psychotic Reaction"	Count Five	3:07
10.	"All for the Love of Rock 'n' Roll"	Tuff Darts	3:25
11.	"All by Myself"	The Heartbreakers	2:52
12.	"California Sun" (original demo)	The Dictators	3:04
13.	"Caught with the Meat in Your Mouth"	Dead Boys	2:07
14.	"I Got Knocked Down (But I'll Get Up)"	Joey Ramone	3:42
15.	"Get Outta My Way"	The Laughing Dogs	2:47
16.	"Sunday Girl" (2013 version)	Blondie	3:03
17.	"I Wanna Be Your Dog"	The Stooges	3:11
18.	"Sonic Reducer"	Dead Boys	3:06
19.	"Roxanne"	The Police	3:12
20.	"Birds and the Bees"	Hilly Kristal	3:59
Total length:			63:59

Rhino deluxe digital exclusive version
No.	Title	Performed by	Length
21.	"Ain't Nothin to Do"	Dead Boys	2:28
22.	"1969"	The Stooges	4:06
23.	"Psycho Killer"	Talking Heads	4:20
24.	"Marquee Moon"	Television	10:38
25.	"Oh Yeah"	The Shadows of Knight	2:48
26.	"All Hell Breaks Loose"	Misfits	1:46
27.	"Mean Machine"	The Cramps	3:57
28.	"Borderline"	MC5	2:54
29.	"Lexicon Devil"	The Germs	1:44
30.	"Who Wants an Ugly Girl?"	Tom Tom Club	4:54
31.	"Don't Want to Know If You Are Lonely"	Hüsker Dü	3:30
32.	"Jocko Homo"	Devo	3:37
33.	"Fun City"	Tuff Darts	2:57
Total length:			113:43

== See also ==
- 1970s nostalgia
