= Randall Miller =

American film director (born 1962)

- Born: July 24, 1962 (age 64); Pasadena, California, U.S.
- Education: University of Southern California; AFI Conservatory (MFA)
- Occupations: Film director; producer; screenwriter; editor; actor
- Years active: 1984–2014; 2016–2023
- Spouse: Jody Savin (m. 1999)
- Relatives: Rhea Perlman (cousin); Heide Perlman (cousin)

Randall Miller (born July 24, 1962) is an American film director, producer, screenwriter, editor, and occasional actor.

At the American Film Institute (AFI), Miller received acclaim for his 1990 short film Marilyn Hotchkiss Ballroom Dancing & Charm School. This led to a career directing films in Hollywood in the 1990s, including the comedies Class Act (1992), Houseguest (1995), and The 6th Man (1997).

In his 40s, Miller ventured into independent film, taking money out of his house to direct and produce Marilyn Hotchkiss' Ballroom Dancing and Charm School (2005), an expansion of his 1990 short into a full-length feature. Miller followed this with the indie films Nobel Son (2007), Bottle Shock (2008), and CBGB (2013), all starring Alan Rickman in the lead role. Miller self-distributed and raised the money for Bottle Shock, his greatest critical success, though the film received generally negative to mixed reviews.

Miller has closely collaborated with his wife Jody Savin on many of his projects, writing and producing multiple films together.

In 2014, while directing and producing Midnight Rider in Georgia, an on-set accident would occur, leading to the death of camera operator Sarah Jones. In 2015, following the accident, Miller pleaded guilty to involuntary manslaughter as part of a plea deal. After completing his prison sentence and probation period, Miller's manslaughter conviction was removed from his record per a Georgia law which permits first-time offenders to expunge their records. Miller is the first filmmaker in history imprisoned for an on-set accident, though others have been criminally charged.

== Early life and education ==
Miller grew up in Pasadena, California. His mother, Leona Miller, was an internist and professor at USC County Medical Center and President of the Diabetes Association. His father, Alexander Miller, was a professor of microbiology at UCLA after completing his graduate studies at Caltech in Pasadena.

Miller attended UC Davis, where he played football and studied biochemistry, inspired by his own parents' careers in medicine. After getting interested in acting, he transferred to UCLA, but dropped out to pursue his acting career, landing television roles in Cheers, Highway to Heaven, and in commercials. During that time, Miller met director Bob Zemeckis of Back to The Future fame while acting in a play with Zemeckis' wife. At Zemeckis' encouragement, Miller completed his undergraduate degree at the USC film school. He then received a master's degree in film from the American Film Institute (AFI). Miller met his future wife Jody Savin at AFI, where he was a director fellow and she was a writing fellow.

== Career ==
=== Early ===
In 1990, Miller directed an award-winning 35-minute thesis film at AFI, Marilyn Hotchkiss Ballroom Dancing & Charm School. Set in 1962, the short featured a cast of children attending a cotillion. The film was based on Miller's own experience going to cotillion as a child in Pasadena. Miller was nominated for CableACE Awards for his writing and direction of Marilyn Hotchkiss.

=== 1990s ===
Miller made his Hollywood directorial debut in 1992 with Class Act, is a modern-day comedic take on The Prince and the Pauper about a pair of teenagers with switched identities.

In 1995, Miller helmed Houseguest, another movie about mistaken identities. The Los Angeles Times said "Houseguest, a rowdy fish-out-of-water comedy, is as good-natured as its big, beefy star, comedian Sinbad." The film debuted at No. 3 and went on to gross $26 million in North America, making it a modest commercial success considering its $10.5 million budget.

Miller then directed the 1997 American sports comedy film The 6th Man, starring Marlon Wayans and Kadeem Hardison. A film review in Variety said Miller "gets so much out of his cast and screenplay."

Miller directed the 1999 Wonderful World of Disney made-for-television comedy film H-E Double Hockey Sticks, for which he was nominated for a Directors Guild of America Award for Outstanding Directing – Children's Programs.

=== 2005–2013: Indie films ===
In 2005, Miller expanded his 1990 short Marilyn Hotchkiss' Ballroom Dancing and Charm School into a full-length feature, incorporating material from the short in the form of flashbacks. The film starred Marisa Tomei, John Goodman, and Robert Carlyle.

It was Miller's first foray into independent film. Following the death of Miller's father and Savin's mother, the couple risked pursuing their dream of making serious films by taking money out of their Pasadena home to finance the movie. The film premiered at the 2005 Sundance Film Festival.

Miller then directed three indie films starring Alan Rickman in the lead role. Rickman said, "This is the Randy and Jody part of my life... It's a unique thing that Randy and Jody have—a totally unique and independent energy."

The first was the 2007 American black comedy Nobel Son about a dysfunctional family dealing with the kidnapping of their son for ransom following the father's winning of the Nobel Prize in Chemistry. In addition to Rickman, the film starred Bill Pullman, Eliza Dushku, and Danny DeVito. In Rickman's character of an egomaniacal genius, Miller was writing about his own professor father. Nobel Son premiered at the Tribeca Film Festival.

In 2008 Alan Rickman returned in a leading role in Miller's movie Bottle Shock, a dramedy based on the 1976 "Judgement of Paris" wine competition in which a California wine shockingly defeats a French one in a blind taste test. Miller and his wife, Jody, were introduced to Marc and Brenda Lhormer, the founders of the Sonoma Valley Film Festival, in 2006 at the opening night of Marilyn Hotchkiss' Ballroom Dancing and Charm School. In 2008, the Lhormers presented a screenplay on the "Judgement of Paris" to Miller and his wife. The story interested Miller and Jody and they took it on board. They ended up writing, directing and producing Bottle Shock. The film also starred Chris Pine and Bill Pullman.

Bottle Shock premiered at the Sundance Film Festival. Without much interest from major distribution houses, Miller opted for the "maverick route" of self-distribution. While the upsides included retaining the DVD and other rights to the film and controlling how the film was rolled out and marketed, Miller said the downsides were "an enormous amount of work, an enormous amount of stress, no sleep". Miller managed to raise some $10 million from private investors for the film and associated costs.

In his third film with Miller, Rickman played Hilly Kristal in CBGB, a 2013 historical film about the former New York music venue of the same name. Miller wrote the screenplay, produced and directed the film revolving around the life of Kristal, musician and owner of the CBGB club. The film also starred Malin Akerman, Justin Bartha, Richard de Klerk, and Johnny Galecki.

=== Midnight Rider manslaughter conviction ===
In 2014, on the first day of production of Midnight Rider, camera assistant Sarah Jones was killed by a train during the filming of a scene near a railway line. The film was never completed. A police investigation in the town of Jesup, Georgia, concluded that CSX Transportation had denied Miller permission to film on the rail line, and that Miller had been criminally trespassing at the time of the incident. Charges for criminal trespassing and involuntary manslaughter were eventually brought against Miller, his wife, producer Jody Savin, producer/UPM Jay Sedrish, and first assistant director Hillary Schwartz for Jones' death.

On March 9, 2015, Miller agreed to a plea deal in exchange for having charges dropped against his wife. He was sentenced to 10 years, the first two to be served in jail, followed by probation, along with a $20,000 fine and 360 hours of community service. Sedrish and Schwartz were sentenced to 10 years' probation with no jail time and ordered to pay fines. The terms of Miller's probation stipulated that he would be "prohibited from serving as director, first assistant director or supervisor" with responsibility for safety on any film production until his sentence was completed. Sedrish's and Schwartz's sentences contained similar provisions. Miller's conviction marked the first time a director was sent to prison for the death of a cast or crew member.

Miller was released from jail on March 23, 2016, after serving slightly more than one year owing to a two-for-one deal made during negotiations for the original plea agreement with Georgia Assistant District Attorney John Johnson requiring the court to revise the original sentence, as it was deemed improper. Sarah Jones's father Richard Jones said in his statement to the court, "When [Sarah's mother] Elizabeth and I agreed to this plea, it was our understanding that he would be serving two years in jail. If had we understood that it would have been one year, we would not have agreed" and stated, "I want to be clear that we don't want to inflict—we don't mean to inflict more pain to Mr. Miller's family. We understand that... it's been quite a lot of pain for their family, but this is, in our view, about a bigger purpose. It's about making the film industry a better, safer place. And in order to do so, we feel very strongly that this is an important element that Mr. Miller be held fully accountable for what he did."

In July 2017, Sarah Jones's family was awarded $11.2 million in civil damages. As reported in the Los Angeles Times, "[t]he jury found that CSX [the train's operator] was primarily liable for the accident and should pay 35% of the total judgment... Miller was found responsible for 28% of the amount of the latest ruling. Rayonier Performance Fibers, owners of the land where the accident occurred, are responsible for 18% and the rest of the liability is divided between individual members of the film's production company."

==== OSHA ====
A 2014 Occupational Safety and Health Administration (OSHA) investigation found that it was "unacceptable" that the film crew was "knowingly exposed[...] to moving trains while filming on a live track and railroad trestle." OSHA further described the safety violations as "serious" and "wilfull." OSHA issued a $74,600 fine to Miller's production company, with Miller appealing the fine directly to OSHA's review board; the board declined to overturn the penalty. Miller appealed the board's decision to a panel (three judges) of the Eleventh Circuit Court of Appeals which again upheld the fine. Miller further appealed to the Eleventh Circuit for an en banc (all judges of the court) hearing. The Eleventh Circuit would affirm the previous judgements and ultimately upheld the fine in 2017.

=== Higher Grounds controversy, probation, and expungement ===
In 2019, Miller directed a film entitled Higher Grounds in Serbia, London, and Colombia, during his probation. After being made aware of this early in 2020, the Jones family alerted Georgia's district attorney's office that Miller was directing a film, in apparent violation of his probation. Former Georgia Assistant District Attorney John Johnson said that Miller had violated the terms of his probation and requested a warrant for his arrest.

Miller and his attorneys have said that they believed that he was allowed to direct a film, so long as he was not responsible for safety. Miller said that the first assistant director, Jason Allen, was designated as the person in charge of safety. At the hearing, the defense called several witnesses, including Miller's California parole officer, his sister, and his father-in-law, who each testified that was also their understanding. Miller also testified that that was how he understood the term. Attorney Mike Smith had told the film crew of Higher Grounds that Miller was able to direct as long as he did not oversee safety, with the film's first assistant director reportedly tasked with safety compliance; however, Johnson noted that Smith likely has a conflict of interest as he is also the movie's executive producer.

A hearing was held on February 17, 2021, in which Miller said that he "misunderstood" the wording of the probation agreement, in particular claiming ambiguity over whether the phrase "responsibility for safety in any film production" allowed him to work as a director provided he did not have authority in safety compliance. At the close of the hearing, Judge Anthony L. Harrison ruled that Miller had not knowingly broken his probation, but said that the agreement should be understood to forbid him from directing any more films for the duration of his sentence.

On March 15, 2025, after completing his probation period, a court order wiped the involuntary manslaughter conviction from his record. The Georgia "First Offender Act" enables certain first-time offenders to have their criminal record expunged.

== Personal life ==
Miller has been married to Jody Savin since March 13, 1999. They have two children together.

Actress Rhea Perlman is Miller's cousin.

== Filmography ==
=== Film ===
Year	Title	Director	Producer	Writer	Editor	Notes
1990	Marilyn Hotchkiss' Ballroom Dancing and Charm School	Yes	Yes	Yes	Yes	Short film
1992	Class Act	Yes	No	No	No	
1995	Houseguest	Yes	No	No	No	
1997	The 6th Man	Yes	No	No	No	
2005	Marilyn Hotchkiss' Ballroom Dancing and Charm School	Yes	Yes	Yes	Yes	
2007	Nobel Son	Yes	Yes	Yes	Yes	
2008	Bottle Shock	Yes	Yes	Yes	Yes	
2013	CBGB	Yes	Yes	Yes	No	
2013	Savannah	No	Yes	No	No	
2023	Coffee Wars	Yes	Yes	Yes	No	Formerly named "Higher Grounds"

Acting roles

Year	Title	Role
1987	Throw Momma from the Train	Bucky
1993	Da Vinci's War	Randy
1995	Houseguest	Drunk at party
1997	The 6th Man	Booster
2008	Bottle Shock	Patron

=== Television ===
Year	Title	Notes
1990	Parker Lewis Can't Lose	Episode "Parker Lewis Must Lose"
1990	Thirtysomething	Episode "Melissa and Men"
1990	Salute Your Shorts	Pilot episode
1992	Northern Exposure	Episode "The Bad Seed"
1993	Running The Halls	5 episodes
1993	CityKids	3 episodes
1999	The Wonderful World of Disney	Episode "H-E Double Hockey Sticks"
1999	H-E Double Hockey Sticks	TV movie
2000	A Tale of Two Bunnies	TV movie
2001	Popular	Episode "Fire in the Hole"
2001	Jack & Jill	Episode "Pressure Points"
2001	Freakylinks	Episode "Subject: Police Siren"
2001	Till Dad Do Us Part	TV movie
2001	Dead Last	Pilot episode

Acting roles

Year	Title	Role	Notes
1984	The Ratings Game	Car Attendant	TV movie
1985	Highway to Heaven	Ice Cream Attentant	Episode "The Brightest Star"
1985	Cheers	Michael	Episode "The Executive's Executioner"
1996	The Mystery Files of Shelby Woo	Conyers	Episode "The Missing Astronaut"
