= We Have Come for Your Children =

Studio album by Dead Boys
- Released: June 1978
- Studios: Criteria, Miami, Florida
- Genre: Punk rock
- Length: 30:17
- Label: Sire
- Producer: Felix Pappalardi

Dead Boys chronology
Young Loud and Snotty (1977)	We Have Come for Your Children (1978)	Night of the Living Dead Boys (1981)

Professional ratings
Review scores
Source	Rating
AllMusic	3.5/5 stars
Kerrang!	3/5 stars
The Rolling Stone Album Guide	2/5 stars
The Village Voice	B−

We Have Come for Your Children is the second studio album by the American punk rock band Dead Boys. It was recorded and released in 1978, on Sire Records. The recording of the album was problematic for the group and sessions were halted when the band became convinced that producer Felix Pappalardi did not understand their music. The band subsequently tried but were unable to get James Williamson of the Stooges to salvage the sessions; they broke up a short time later.

== Track listing ==
1. "3rd Generation Nation" (Stiv Bators) – 2:35
2. "I Won't Look Back" (Jimmy Zero) – 2:16
3. "(I Don't Wanna Be No) Catholic Boy" (Bators) – 2:42
4. "Flame Thrower Love" (Bators, Zero) – 2:03
5. "Son of Sam" (Zero) – 5:10
6. "Tell Me" (Mick Jagger, Keith Richards) – 2:37
7. "Big City" (Kim Fowley, Steven Tetsch) – 3:03
8. "Calling On You (Bators, Cheetah Chrome, Zero) – 3:29
9. "Dead and Alive" (Bators, Chrome) – 1:48
10. "Ain't It Fun" (Cheetah Chrome, Peter Laughner) – 4:34

== Personnel ==
Dead Boys

- Stiv Bators - lead vocals
- Jimmy Zero - guitar, backing vocals
- Johnny Blitz - drums
- Cheetah Chrome - guitar, backing vocals
- Jeff Magnum - bass

with:

- Felix Pappalardi - backing vocals on "I Won't Look Back"
- Dee Dee Ramone, Joey Ramone as the Ramone Catholic Choir - backing vocals on "(I Don't Wanna Be No) Catholic Boy"

== Cover versions ==
- Punk band Electric Frankenstein covered "3rd Generation Nation" on their album Annie's Grave.
- Guns N' Roses covered "Ain't It Fun" on their album "The Spaghetti Incident?".
- Amen referenced this album's title with their 2000 album We Have Come for Your Parents
- Punk band the Freeze covered "Calling On You" on their EP Blood Flows Home.
- Sex Pistols producer Dave Goodman assembled a Pistols compilation titled We've Cum for Your Children, an evident parody title of this Dead Boys album.
