= Ain't It Fun =

Ain't It Fun may refer to:

- "Ain't It Fun" (Dead Boys song), a 1978 song
- "Ain't It Fun" (Paramore song), a 2013 song
