= CUK =

CUK may refer to:

- Catholic University of Korea, in Seoul and Bucheon, South Korea
- Caye Caulker Airport, Belize (IATA airport code: CUK)
- Cakung railway station, a railway station in Jakarta, Indonesia
- Cuk (instrument)
- Change UK, also known as The Independent Group for Change, a defunct UK political party

== See also ==
- Ćuk converter, in electronics
- Çük, an Idel-Ural festival
- Miloš Ćuk (born 1990), Serbian water polo player
- Slobodan Ćuk, inventor, electrical engineer after whom the Ćuk converter is named
- Vladimir Cuk (born 1975), Croatian actor and former basketball player
