= Only Lovers Left Alive (novel) =

1964 novel by Dave Wallis

- First edition (publ. Anthony Blond)
- Author: Dave Wallis
- Language: English
- Publication date: 1964

Only Lovers Left Alive is a 1964 dystopian fiction novel by Dave Wallis. It describes a near-future society in which all adults have committed suicide and teenagers are able to run wild. With its theme of youth in charge and out of control, the book hit a chord with the emerging counter-culture, and a film adaptation starring the Rolling Stones and directed by Nicholas Ray was planned in the mid-1960s.

== Publication ==
Wallis was an English writer working as a supply teacher, with two previous novels, and he was in his late 40s when it came out. After being rejected by his previous publisher Heinemann, Only Lovers Left Alive was published by Anthony Blond with a print run of 10,000 copies, high for a comparatively unknown author. US paperback rights were sold for US$25,000.

== Plot ==
All adults have died by suicide, and teenagers are left to their own devices. Gangs war with each other, while more sensible teens try to establish a new society.

== Response ==
The Observer praised the novel's first half for linking the teenagers' destructiveness to the violence of present-day society, but found it tended towards an adventure novel full of cliche and sensationalism. Kirkus Reviews said "characters are perfectly banal and the author's imagination pedestrian". The New York Times called the book's premise "irresistible".

== Cultural influence ==
The novel gained a cultural importance, being viewed as a symbol of the rising power of teenagers in popular culture. It was banned by Irish censors in 1966.

It was considered as a possible film project for the Rolling Stones in the mid-1960s, with Nicholas Ray possibly to direct in 1966. Ray's involvement only lasted a few weeks of trans-Atlantic travel and press conferences. According to Billboard, Andrew Loog Oldham and Allen Klein were to produce, and the band would have received US$1 million.

The novel inspired the Kids Rule O.K. story in the British IPC Magazines comic Action. Like Only Lovers Left Alive, Kids Rule O.K. depicted a dystopian world where most adults had died and gangs of teenagers roamed the cities. Kids Rule O.K. provoked a public outcry and led to Action being suspended by its publishers. When Action reappeared, the Kids Rule O.K. story had been removed from the publication.

The novel lent its title to the 1981 album by The Wanderers, a new wave act featuring Stiv Bators and Dave Tregunna (both later of The Lords of the New Church). Marco Pirroni of Adam and the Ants named a record label after the book, and The Long Blondes used the title for a song from their 2006 album Someone to Drive You Home. It is also reported as having been a favourite book of Doors singer Jim Morrison.
