= L.A. L.A. (album) =

Compilation album by Stiv Bators
- Released: 1994
- Recorded: 1979–1980; 1986–1987
- Genre: Punk rock
- Label: Bomp!

L.A. L.A. is a compilation album of the best of the music recorded by Stiv Bators at the Bomp! Records studios (other than his 1980 LP, Disconnected) before and after his involvement with the Lords of the New Church when he was attempting to reinvent himself as a pop singer. The title track about Los Angeles was a 10" single.

== Track listing ==
1. "The Last Year" (Stiv Bators/Frank Secich) – Rel. May 1979, single version
2. "It's Cold Outside" (Danny Klawon) – Rel. May 1979, single version
3. "Circumstantial Evidence" (Stiv Bators/Frank Secich) – Rel. January 1980, single version
4. "Not that Way Anymore" (Stiv Bators/Frank Secich) – Rel. January 1980, single version
5. "I'll Be Alright" (Stiv Bators/Frank Secich) – Rec. 1980, unreleased demo
6. "I Stand Accused" (W. Levine) – Rec. 1979, unreleased demo
7. "L.A. L.A." ("Louie Louie") (Richard Berry/Stiv Bators) – Rec. Jan. 1980, unreleased jam session
8. "Blues" (Kim Fowley/Stiv Bators) – Rec. January 1980, unreleased jam session
9. "Factory Boy" (Kim Fowley/Stiv Bators) – Rec. January 1980, unreleased jam session
10. "The Story in Your Eyes" (Justin Hayward) – Rel. Fall of 1986
11. "Have Love Will Travel" (Richard Berry) – Rel. Fall of 1986
12. "I'm No More" (Stiv Bators) – Rel. 1987, unreleased demo
13. "Gudbuy T' Jane" (Holder/Lea) – Rel. 1987, unreleased demo
14. "Circumstantial Evidence" (Stiv Bators/Frank Secich), alternate version
15. "I'll Be Alright" (Stiv Bators/Frank Secich), alternate version
16. "Not that Way Anymore" (Stiv Bators/Frank Secich), alternate version
17. "It's Cold Outside" (Danny Klawon), alternate version
18. "The Last Year" (Stiv Bators/Frank Secich), alternate version
