= The Wanderers (band) =

British punk rock band (1980–1981)

- Origin: England
- Genres: Punk rock
- Years active: 1980–1981
- Label: Polydor
- Spinoffs: The Lords of the New Church
- Spinoff of: Sham 69
- Past members: Stiv Bators; Dave Parsons; Dave "Kermit" Tregunna; Ricky "Rock" Goldstein

The Wanderers were a short-lived British punk rock band consisting of Stiv Bators and members of Sham 69, and active between 1980 and 1981. They recorded one album before splitting up.

== History ==
After Jimmy Pursey left Sham 69 in 1980, Dave Parsons (guitar), Dave Tregunna (bass) and Ricky "Rock" Goldstein (drums), decided to continue making music. With Stiv Bators (ex-Dead Boys member who had just published his solo album Disconnected) on vocals, they intended to carry on as Sham 69, but for contractual reasons initially used the name The Allies before renaming the band The Wanderers (after the film of the same name) in 1981. In December 1980, they finished producing an album, but it was not released until May 1981. The English press called the band 'Dead 69' or 'Sham Boys' in reference to the origins of the band members.

In March 1981, the band's first single, "Ready to Snap" (B-side: "Beyond the Law"), was released, and the band played at the Lyceum Theatre in London. On 18 May, the debut album Only Lovers Left Alive was released, the title taken from the novel by Dave Wallis. The concept album tells the story of far-right conspiracy theorist Peter Beter (who allegedly provided secret information on tapes) from the perspective of a teenager who wants to fight "the system" only to ultimately succumb to it. The album had 12 songs, and on the back cover art they printed "They Made Me Criminal". However, that song was never part of the album. The album got great reviews from the magazine Sounds, while the magazine Record Mirror reacted somewhat cautiously to it. Writing for Allmusic, Dave Thompson wrote that the album "remains one of the most foreboding records ever released and plunges the listener into a world of Bolshevik plots, duplicate Popes, and a third World War that is so close you can smell it". An Allmusic review described the music as "gutsy pop-punk built around razor-sharp guitars". A Phoenix New Times review was less positive, with Brian Smith viewing the album to be "plagued by faux strings, tin-eared production and hokey Orwellian themes".

In June 1981, they released their cover version of the Bob Dylan song "The Times They Are A-Changin'" (B-side: "It's a Little Bit Frightening") as their last single.

The sales expectations of Polydor Records were not met and they were also unsuccessful at self-funding a US tour. When Dave Parsons became infected with hepatitis, the band broke up. Stiv Bators and Dave Tregunna created The Lords of the New Church, while Ricky Goldstein joined the cover band, The Bootleg Beatles. After partial recovery, Dave Parsons played for Framed, coordinated a Sham 69 reunion with Pursey in 1987 and recorded solo albums.

Only Lovers Left Alive was reissued on the Captain Oi! label in 2000.

== Discography ==
=== Singles ===
- "Ready to Snap!"/"Beyond the Law" (1981), Polydor
- "The Times They Are A-Changin'"/"It's a little Bit Frightening" (1981), Polydor

=== Albums ===
- Only Lovers Left Alive (1981), Polydor
- Only Lovers Left Alive Special Edition Gutterwail (2020)
