= RFTT =

RFTT may refer to:

- Rocket from the Tombs, an American rock band
- Reach for the Top, a Canadian high school quiz competition
