= Little Bob =

French rock musician

- Roberto Piazza in live (2005).

Background information
- Born: Roberto Piazza; May 10, 1945 (age 81); Alessandria, Italy
- Genres: Rock, blues
- Occupations: Singer-songwriter, actor
- Instrument: Vocals
- Years active: 1974–present
- Labels: Chiswick, L&B
- Website: www.littlebob.fr

Roberto Piazza (May 10, 1945, Alessandria, Italy) better known by his stage name as Little Bob is a French rock musician with strong blues and rhythm 'n' blues influences.

Lemmy from Motörhead features on the album Ringolevio (1987).

In 2011, the vocalist Roberto Piazza alias Little Bob plays himself in the movie Le Havre directed by Aki Kaurismäki, in competition at the 2011 edition of Festival de Cannes.

== Discography ==
=== Studio albums ===
Little Bob Story

- 1976 : High Time
- 1977 : Off The Rails
- 1977 : Living in the Fast Lane
- 1978 : Come See Me
- 1980 : Light of My Town
- 1982 : Vacant Heart
- 1984 : Too Young To Love Me
- 1985 : ...Wanderers...Followers...Lovers...
- 1987 : Ringolevio

Little Bob

- 1989 : Rendez-Vous in Angel City
- 1991 : Alive or nothing
- 1993 : Lost Territories
- 1997 : Blue stories
- 2002 : Libero
- 2005 : The Gift
- 2009 : Time To Blast

Little Bob Blues Bastards

- 2012 : Break Down The Walls
- 2015 : Howlin'
- 2018 : New Day Coming

=== Live albums ===
- 1978 : Live in London
- 2003 : Rock On Riff On Roll On Move On – Live 2003
- 2005 : Live in the Dockland
- 2005 : Live in London (reedition)

=== Compilations ===
- 1977 : Little Bob Story
- 1991 : High Time + Like Rock'n Roll
- 1999 : One Story Volume 1
- 2000 : One Story Volume 2
- 2011 : Wild And Deep – Best Of 1989/2009

=== Featurings ===
- 1999 : Tribute to Lee Brilleaux
- 2000 : Blues against racism
- 2002 : Roots and new 2002
- 2002 : A South Louisiana soul sensation

== Bibliography ==
- Little Bob et Christian Eudeline, La Story, Éditions Denoël, coll. X-treme, 2010 ISBN 978-2-2072-6040-1, 251 p.
- Stories of Little Bob, histoires pour Roberto. Jean-Bernard Pouy, Frédéric Prilleux, Jean-Noël Levavasseur, Jean-Luc Manet, Stéphane Le Carre, Stéphane Pajot, Sylvie Rouch, Serguei Dounovtez et al., Editions Krakoën. www.krakoen.fr. April 2013.
