= Young, Loud and Snotty =

Studio album by Dead Boys
- Released: October 1977
- Recorded: 1977
- Studio: Electric Lady (New York, New York)
- Genre: Punk rock
- Length: 35:23
- Label: Sire
- Producer: Genya Ravan

Dead Boys chronology
Young, Loud and Snotty (1977)	We Have Come for Your Children (1978)

Professional ratings
Review scores
Source	Rating
AllMusic	4.5/5 stars
The Encyclopedia of Popular Music	4/5 stars
Kerrang!	5/5 stars
The Rolling Stone Album Guide	4/5 stars
The Village Voice	B

Young, Loud and Snotty is the first studio album by the American punk band Dead Boys. It was recorded and released in 1977 on Sire Records, produced by Genya Ravan. The album is the only Dead Boys album to chart, peaking at 189 on the Billboard 200 in November 1977.

The album was included at No. 7 on the Rolling Stone "10 Greatest Punk Rock Albums" reader poll.

== Release ==
The album was originally released in October 1977 by Sire Records on LP, cassette and 8-track. In 1992, the album was first released on CD, and re-released on cassette, under the Sire name as part of Warner Bros. Records' Plundering the Vaults line. These releases featured a bonus track, "Not Anymore/Ain't Nothin' to Do (Medley)", which was originally released on the "Tell Me" 7" in 1978.

== Track listing ==
All tracks composed by Stiv Bators, Cheetah Chrome & Jimmy Zero; except where indicated.

1. "Sonic Reducer" (David Thomas, Cheetah Chrome) – 3:05
2. "All This and More" – 2:49
3. "What Love Is" – 2:08
4. "Not Anymore" – 3:38
5. "Ain't Nothin' to Do" – 2:25
6. "Caught with the Meat in Your Mouth" – 2:06
7. "Hey Little Girl" (Bob Gonzales, Don Baskin) – 3:01 (Recorded live at CBGB)
8. "I Need Lunch" – 3:36
9. "High Tension Wire" – 3:05
10. "Down in Flames" – 2:15
11. "Not Anymore/Ain't Nothin' to Do" – 7:15 (bonus track on CD releases)

=== Cassette and 8-track ===
The album was re-arranged for the original cassette and 8-track releases

1. "Sonic Reducer"
2. "Not Anymore"
3. "All This and More"
4. "What Love Is"
5. "Ain't Nothin' to Do"
6. ""Caught with the Meat in Your Mouth"
7. "Hey Little Girl"
8. "Down in Flames"
9. "I Need Lunch"
10. "High Tension Wire"

== 40th anniversary re-recording ==
In 2017, founding members Cheetah Chrome and Johnny Blitz reformed Dead Boys with a new lineup and re-recorded Young, Loud and Snotty. Still Snotty: Young, Loud and Snotty at 40 was released on September 8, 2017.

== Personnel ==
Dead Boys

- Stiv Bators – vocals
- Cheetah Chrome – lead guitar
- Jimmy Zero – rhythm guitar
- Jeff Magnum – bass guitar
- Johnny Blitz – drums

with:

- Ronald Binder – voice on "Down in Flames"
- Bob Clearmountain – bass guitar

Production

- Arranged by Dead Boys
- Produced by Genya Ravan
- Recorded and engineered by Dave Wittman
- Assistant recording engineer: Jim Galante
- Mixed by Harvey Goldberg
- Mastered by Ted Jensen
