= The 6th Man =

- Theatrical release poster
- Directed by: Randall Miller
- Written by: Christopher Reed; Cynthia Carle
- Produced by: David Hoberman
- Starring: Marlon Wayans; Kadeem Hardison; Kevin Dunn; Michael Michele; David Paymer
- Cinematography: Mike Ozier
- Edited by: Eric A. Sears
- Music by: Marcus Miller
- Production companies: Touchstone Pictures; Mandeville Films
- Distributed by: Buena Vista Pictures Distribution
- Release date: March 28, 1997
- Running time: 108 minutes
- Country: United States
- Language: English
- Budget: $11 million
- Box office: $14.8 million

The 6th Man, sometimes titled The Sixth Man, is a 1997 American sports comedy film directed by Randall Miller. The film stars Marlon Wayans and Kadeem Hardison. The film features real National Collegiate Athletic Association (NCAA) schools, although the rosters are fictitious. Some schools shown in the film include the University of Washington, University of Massachusetts Amherst, California State University, Fresno (better known as Fresno State), Georgetown University, the University of Kentucky, the University of Arkansas, UCLA, and others. The film features cameos from college basketball personalities such as Jerry Tarkanian and Dick Vitale.

The film was released in the United States on March 28, 1997 to negative reviews from critics and mild box office success, grossing almost $15 million.

== Plot ==
Antoine and Kenny Tyler, two close brothers, play a basketball game in 1986. Their motto for each other is "A&K: All the Way", created by their mother. Their father, James, coaches the team and directs Kenny to take the last shot for the win, but he passes the ball to Antoine out of fright, who misses and costs them the game. That night, Kenny tries to cheer Antoine up, still upset about missing the shot. James tells them that all they have to do is stick together and anything can happen.

In the present day, both Antoine and Kenny are a famed duo on their University of Washington college basketball team, the Huskies. Celebrating their most recent win at a nightclub, Kenny meets R.C. St. John, a reporter for UW, with whom he sparks an interest in. During a road game at UCLA, Antoine scores a slam dunk before suffering a heart attack while hanging on the rim. Coach Pederson informs Kenny and the team after the game that Antoine has died.

Without Antoine, the team begins falling apart. Kenny prays for Antoine's help to get the team to the national championship. During one game, however, odd sequences begin to occur, leading to a surprising win. Antoine's ghost appears to Kenny in the locker room, revealing he aided the team supernaturally, and explains that the reason he's back is because Kenny called him. Kenny's teammates begin to question his concerning behavior (as only Kenny can see Antoine), and he informs his teammates about Antoine's reemergence, who are skeptical until Antoine uses supernatural forces to persuade them. Under Antoine's influence, the team storms through the competition and eventually make it to the NCAA tournament, for the first time in over a decade. Meanwhile, Kenny's relationship with R.C. deepens, despite Antoine's efforts to disband the two, believing R.C. is only out to get a story on him, which is partially true. R.C. originally prepares to submit a story to the paper when Kenny discloses to her that Antoine is aiding the team, but eventually decides against it.

The rest of the team begins to have misgivings about Antoine helping them in their games. Kenny informs Antoine, who becomes irate, and wrecks the room they're in. After calming down, Antoine relates to Kenny that he never wanted to die. Kenny tells the team he wants Antoine to stay, because he doesn't want to lose his brother again. However, in the Final Four against Georgetown, Antoine's antics seriously injure their All-American, Jerrod Smith, a close friend of Kenny's. While Kenny visits Jerrod at the hospital, R.C. arrives and knows it's because of Antoine, having discovered his spirit and clues in a game's footage. R.C. tells Kenny that he's letting Antoine run his life even in death, and will never truly live unless he lets Antoine go. Kenny tells Antoine not to interfere during the championship game with the team by his side, or they will voluntarily forfeit. Disappointed, Antoine leaves, but lingers nearby.

The team plays poorly in the first half of their championship game without Antoine's erstwhile preternatural intervention, spurring a halftime speech from Kenny that rouses his teammates and leads to an impressive rally in the second half to bring the game close. With the score tied in the waning seconds, Kenny attempts the game winning shot. Antoine tries to help, but Kenny tells him not to, making the shot on his own and winning the Huskies their very first championship. Before ascending into the afterlife, Antoine shares one final moment with his brother, reminding Kenny that he will always be with him. As Kenny celebrates with his team, Antoine goes off into the distance under an array of lights. Coach Pederson sees this and asks Kenny if this was Antoine, to which Kenny admits, saying their mantra "A&K: All the Way".

== Cast ==
- Marlon Wayans as Kenny Tyler
- Kadeem Hardison as Antoine Tyler
- David Paymer as Coach Pederson
- Michael Michele as R.C. St. John
- Kevin Dunn as Mikulski
- Gary Jones as Gertz
- Lorenzo Orr as Malik Major
- Vladimir Cuk as Zigi Hrbaček
- Travis Ford as Danny O'Grady
- Jack Karuletwa as Luther Lasalle
- Chris Spencer as Jimmy Stubbs
- Kirk Baily as Coach Nichols
- Saundra McClain as Camille Tyler

== Production ==
The 6th Man was set and filmed in Seattle, Washington and Vancouver, British Columbia, Canada on April 2 until May 17, 1996. It had an estimated budget of $11 million.

== Release ==
The film was released on March 28, 1997, and made $4,128,178 in its opening weekend at the box office, and went on to gross $14,772,788 throughout its theatrical run.

=== Critical reception ===
The 6th Man has a 23% approval rating on Rotten Tomatoes, and an average critic rating of 3.8/10 based on 13 reviews.

Roger Ebert of the Chicago Sun-Times said:

"The Sixth Man is another paint-by-the-numbers sports movie, this one about a college basketball team that makes it to the NCAA finals with the help of the ghost of one of its dead stars. Let's not talk about how predictable it is. Let's talk about how dumb it is. … Movies like The Sixth Man are an example of Level One thinking, in which the filmmakers get the easy, obvious idea and are content with it."

== Soundtrack ==
The soundtrack was released on March 25, 1997, by Hollywood Records. It peaked at #33 on the Top R&B/Hip-Hop Albums.

== See also ==
- List of basketball films
- List of ghost films
