= Ain't It Fun (Dead Boys song) =

Single

Song by Dead Boys

from the album We Have Come for Your Children
- Released: June 1978
- Genre: Punk rock
- Length: 4:33
- Label: Sire
- Songwriter(s): Peter Laughner; Gene O'Connor
- Producer(s): Felix Pappalardi

"Ain't It Fun" is a song written by Peter Laughner and Gene O'Connor (known as Cheetah Chrome) and performed by their protopunk band Rocket from the Tombs. The song was first released by O'Connor's later group Dead Boys on their 1978 second studio album, We Have Come for Your Children. Laughner died a year before.

== Lyrics ==
"Ain't It Fun" is notable for being one of the first commercially released recordings of song lyrics containing the profanity cunt, which is said once in the song's third verse. The word's presence was not picked up on by the media at the time, with the same being the case in the release of Guns N' Roses' 1993 cover, which reached the top 10 in several countries' singles charts despite being uncensored.

== Guns N' Roses version ==
"Ain't It Fun"
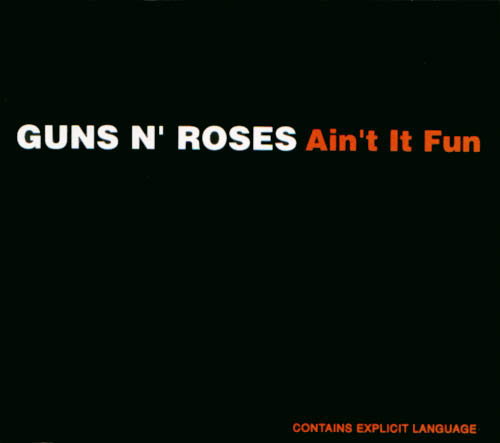

Single by Guns N' Roses

from the album "The Spaghetti Incident?"
- B-side: "Down on the Farm"
- Released: November 8, 1993
- Length: 5:06
- Label: Geffen
- Songwriter(s): Peter Laughner; Gene O'Connor
- Producer(s): Mike Clink; Guns N' Roses

Guns N' Roses singles chronology
| "Civil War" (1993) | "Ain't It Fun" (1993) | "Estranged" (1993) |

The song was covered by American rock band Guns N' Roses for their 1993 cover album "The Spaghetti Incident?". It was also released as a single and included on the Guns N' Roses Greatest Hits compilation in 2004. Michael Monroe from Hanoi Rocks featured on vocals. GNR guitarist Slash observed that Monroe "was just excited about having it come out, because it was a cool song, and it was sort of a memorial for Stiv Bators".

=== Charts ===
==== Weekly charts ====
| Chart (1993) | Peak position |
|---|---|
| Belgium (Ultratop 50 Flanders) | 26 |
| Europe (Eurochart Hot 100) | 17 |
| Finland (The Official Finnish Charts) | 15 |
| Germany (GfK) | 34 |
| Ireland (IRMA) | 14 |
| Netherlands (Dutch Top 40) | 20 |
| Netherlands (Single Top 100) | 22 |
| New Zealand (Recorded Music NZ) | 36 |
| Norway (VG-lista) | 3 |
| Portugal (AFP) | 2 |
| Sweden (Sverigetopplistan) | 5 |
| Switzerland (Schweizer Hitparade) | 15 |
| UK Singles (OCC) | 9 |
| UK Airplay (Music Week) | 36 |
| US Mainstream Rock (Billboard) | 8 |

==== Year-end charts ====
| Chart (1993) | Position |
|---|---|
| Sweden (Topplistan) | 59 |

== Other covers ==
When Rocket from the Tombs reunited in 2003, they recorded the song and released it on their debut album, Rocket Redux. Rollins Band also covered the song for their album A Nicer Shade of Red. The Lords of Altamont covered the song on their 2011 album Midnight to 666.

== Sources ==
- Cheetah Chrome and Legs McNeil, (2010). Cheetah Chrome: A Dead Boy's Tale: From the Front Lines of Punk Rock (Voyageur Press; First edition). ISBN 978-0-7603-3773-8.
