= The Mods (band) =

Canadian punk rock band

- Origin: Toronto, Ontario, Canada
- Genres: punk rock
- Years active: 1978–1980
- Labels: Ugly Pop Records; Other People's Music
- Members: Greg Triner; Scott Marks; Mark Dixon; David Quinton Steinberg

The Mods were a punk rock band from Toronto during the first wave of late 1970s punk. They formed in 1978 with members Greg Triner (vocals), Scott Marks (guitar), Mark Dixon (bass), and David Quinton Steinberg (drums). The Mods were influenced by The Jam and had a similar look and sound. Where other bands were wearing black leather, T-shirts, and tight jeans, The Mods chose to wear suits and ties. Unlike many of the rowdier Toronto bands of the era, the Mods were known for being tight and professional.

The band played heavily in the Toronto area as well as further afield than most other Toronto bands of the era, playing in New York, Philadelphia, Cleveland, Chicago and Detroit. In November 1979, The Mods opened for The Police when they made their Toronto debut at the Danforth Music Hall. They also opened for The Specials, Squeeze, and Ultravox.

In 1978, they independently recorded the singles "Step Out Tonight" and "You Use Me". They recorded another album's worth of material but a proposed major label record deal fell through. They briefly changed their name to 'The News' before breaking up in 1980. David Quinton would go on to play on Stiv Bators solo album.

The Mods complete recordings, along with some live tracks, were released in 1995, in the album Twenty 2 Months. Since then the band has periodically reformed for reunion gigs, the last of which was in November 2013 at The Rivoli in Toronto.

A Mods 1978 performance is included in the 2013 documentary about the Toronto punk movement, The Last Pogo Jumps Again. They also appear on the soundtrack.

In 2018, Ugly Pop Records released a collection of the bands songs, taken from a 1979 demo tape, generally considered to be their most authentic recording, on the album Reactions.

== Discography ==
- "Step Out Tonight" (single, B: "You Use Me"), 1978, Independent
- Twenty 2 Months, 1995, Other People's Music
- Reactions, 2018, Ugly Pop Records
