= Little Bob Story =

French rock group (1970s–80s)

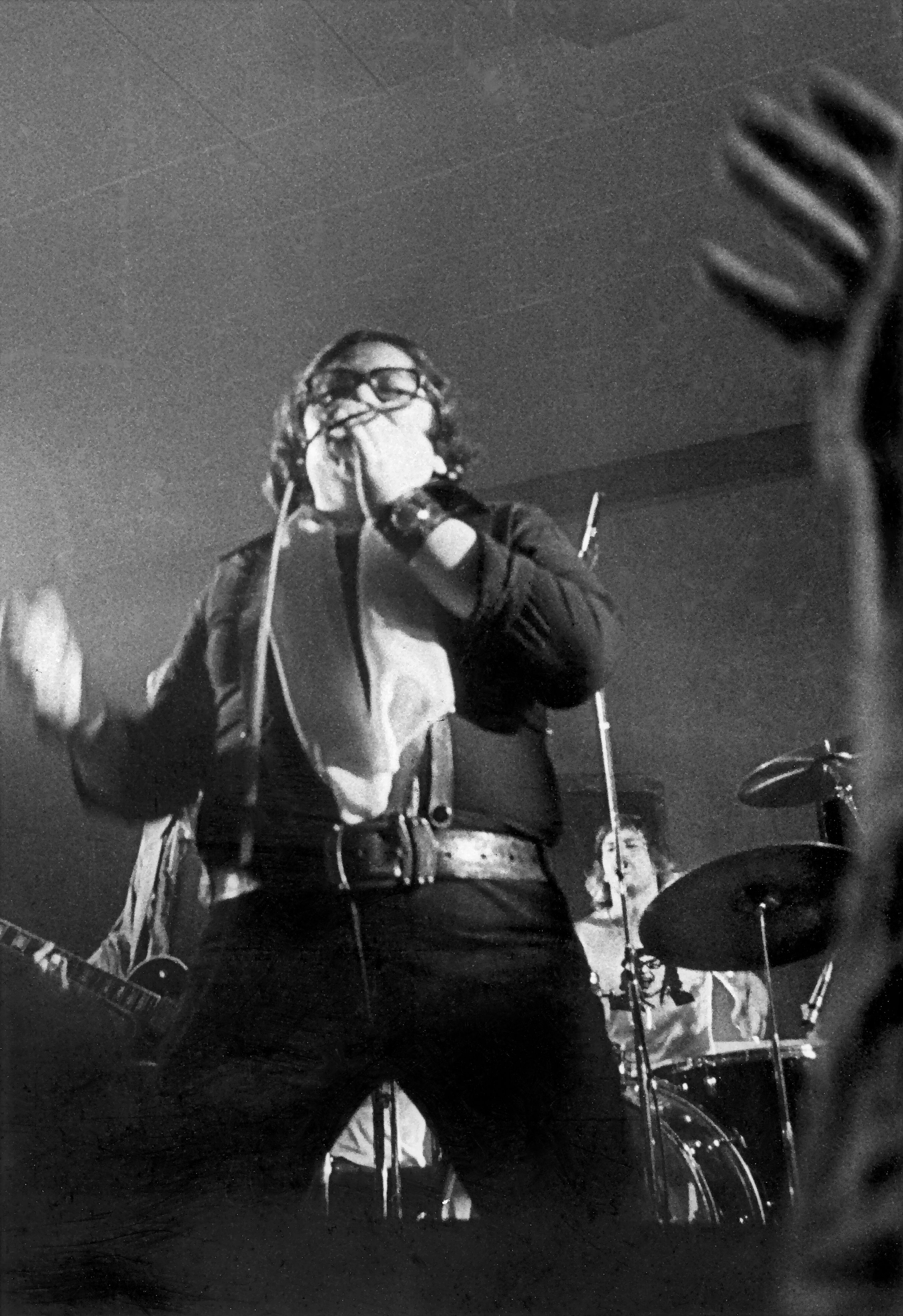

Background information
- Origin: France
- Genres: Rock
- Years active: 1975-1989
- Members: Little Bob (vocals), Guy-Georges Gremy (guitar), Barbe Noire (bass), Mino Quertier (drums)
- Website: www.littlebob.fr

Little Bob Story were a French rock group from Le Havre, formed in 1971.

== Biography ==
Little Bob Story were initially made up of Little Bob (Roberto Piazza) on vocals, Guy-Georges Gremy (guitar), Barbe Noire (bass) and Mino Quertier (drums). They were managed by Roberto's brother and occasionally had tours booked by booking agent Christian Brunet who also booked Musicorama at the Olympia.

Little Bob Story, played rock and roll music similar to pub rock, and were one of the few French groups to get some recognition in the United Kingdom. In 1976 they signed with Chiswick Records and took advantage of the explosion of punk rock. They were the only French act included on the New Wave compilation album, which was released in the UK in 1977. They played the Mont-de-Marsan punk festival in both 1976 and 1977 but were unable to replicate their UK success in France and disbanded in virtual anonymity in 1989.

From 1989 onwards, Roberto Piazza has performed under the name Little Bob.

== Discography ==
=== Studio albums ===
Little Bob Story

- 1976 : High Time (Arcane/Eurodisc/WEA 87 076-913 076)
- 1977 : Living In The Fast Lane (Crypto/RCA ZAL 6429)
- 1977 : Off The Rails (Chiswick WIG 6)
- 1978 : Come See Me (RCA)
- 1980 : Light of My Town (RCA)
- 1982 : Vacant Heart (RCA)
- 1984 : Too Young To Love Me (Pathé Marconi EMI)
- 1987 : Ringolevio (Accord/Musidisc)

Little Bob

- 1989 : Rendez-Vous In Angel City
- 1991 : Alive Or Nothing
- 1993 : Lost Territories
- 1997 : Blue Stories
- 1999 : One Story Volume 1
- 2000 : One Story Volume 2
- 2002 : Libero
- 2003 : Rock On Riff On Roll On Move On, LIVE 2003 (double cd)
- 2005 : The Gift (2 cd : cd1 : Still Burning, cd2 : My Flaming Roots)
- 2007 : Live In The Dockland (1 cd and 1 dvd)
- 2009 : Time To Blast

=== Live albums ===
- 1979 : Live (RCA)
- 1985 : Wanderers, Followers, Lovers (Accord/Musidisc)
- 1991 : Alive Or Nothing
- 2003 : Rock On Riff On Roll On Move On Live 2003 (double cd)
- 2007 : Live in the Dockland (1 cd and 1 dvd)

=== Compilations ===
- 1977 : Little Bob Story (1975-1976) (Crypto/RCA ZAL 6415)

=== Singles ===
- 1975 : "Don't Let Me Be Misunderstood"/"I Don't Know" (Arcane/Eurodisc/WEA 12 827-911 001)
- 1975 : "Let Me In"/"Like Rock'n'Roll" (Arcane/Eurodisc/WEA 12 842-911 018)
- 1976 : "I'm Crying"/"I Need Money"/"Baby Don't Cry" (Chiswick SW7)
- 1977 : "All or Nothing"/"Hot'N'Sweaty" (Mercury (UK) 6007 141)
- 1978 : "Seaside Bar Song"/"Italian Nights" (RCA Victor PB 8291)
- 1979 : "Lucille"/"High Time" (RCA Victor DB 8477)
- 1980 : "Bus Stop"/"Switchblade Julie" (RCA PB 8562)
- 1982 : "Mad Dog"/"Moving Slowly In the Dark" (RCA DB 8866)
- 1984 : "Too Young to Love Me"/"Hurt So Badly" (Pathé Marconi EMI 1728247)
- 1986 : "Cover Girl"/"Shooga Shooga" (Accord 135142)
- 1987 : "Hush"/"Motorcycle Boy" (Accord 135163)
- 1988 : "Crosses On The Hill"/"No More Words" (Accord 102177)
- 1988 : "Tell Everybody the Truth"/"Kick Out the Jams" (Accord 100697)

== Films ==
- 2011 : Roberto Piazza plays himself in Le Havre by Aki Kaurismäki
- 2015 : Rockin' Class Hero, documentary on Little Bob (52 min), by Gilbert Carsoux and Laurent Jézéquel. Zaradoc Films Distribution.
