= Cole (film) =

- Directed by: Carl Bessai
- Written by: Adam Zang
- Produced by: Carl Bessai; Dylan Thomas Collingwood; Jason James; Irene Nelson; Kimani Ray Smith
- Starring: Richard de Klerk; Kandyse McClure; Chad Willett; Rebecca Jenkins; Sonja Bennett
- Cinematography: Carl Bessai
- Edited by: Mark Shearer
- Music by: Clinton Shorter
- Production companies: Rampart Films; Titlecard Pictures
- Release date: September 15, 2009 (TIFF)
- Running time: minutes
- Country: Canada
- Language: English

Cole is a Canadian drama film, directed by Carl Bessai and released in 2009.

The film stars Richard de Klerk as Cole Chambers, a young man from Lytton who longs to escape his smalltown existence with his dysfunctional family. He is accepted into a university creative writing program in Vancouver, where he begins a romance with Serafina (Kandyse McClure), but faces a difficult choice when his friends and family back home struggle to survive without his presence. The cast also includes Rebecca Jenkins as Cole's mentally ill mother, Sonja Bennett as his sister Maybelline, and Chad Willett as Maybelline's abusive husband Bobby.

The film premiered at the 2009 Toronto International Film Festival, and screened at a number of other film festivals before going into commercial release in 2010.

Chad Willett won the Leo Award for Best Supporting Performance by a Male in a Feature Length Drama in 2010

Bennett received a Genie Award nomination for Best Supporting Actress at the 31st Genie Awards.
