= Dave Wallis =

English novelist

- Born: David Capadose Wallis; 27 November 1917; Marylebone, London, England
- Died: 12 June 1990 (aged 72); Colchester, Essex, England
- Occupation: Novelist
- Spouse: Cecily Fearn (1940–1990, his death)
- Writing career
- Period: 1958–1971
- Genre: Literary fiction

Dave Wallis (27 November 1917 – 12 June 1990) was an English novelist, best known for his third novel Only Lovers Left Alive, which was optioned by The Rolling Stones in the mid 1960s as a potential vehicle for their collective film debut. The novel was republished in 2015 by Valancourt Books.

== Early biography ==
The mini-biography on the back flap of his first novel says: "He was born in London but brought up in Canada where his father was a broker and his mother an actress. He grew up in an atmosphere of the theatre and comfortable bohemianism until the great slump of the early thirties when the family fell on hard times and returned to England. He worked his way back to Canada on a Danish coal boat in 1935 and has worked since in various jobs including that of labourer in a sheet-metal works, in a travel agency and as a telephone installation mechanic." He joined the Young Communist League in the 1930s, an act which estranged him from his father. He married Cecily Fearn in 1940. Between 1940 and 1946 he served with the Royal Corps of Signals and was in the Western Desert and other parts of the Middle East Command, finishing the war in Germany. After the war, in 1947, he entered the emergency training scheme for teachers, and began teaching a year later. He also turned away from communism and joined the Labour Party.

== Works ==
His first novel, Tram-stop by the Nile, was published in 1958. It was largely well-received, with the Irish Times reviewer describing it as "probably the first novel to describe the war in the desert, not from the point of view of the heroes of El Alamein, but from the angle of the international spivs and racketeers who lived in Cairo throughout the war years...". The reviewer from the Oxford Mail agreed, saying it was a "first-rate, first-hand account of the middle of the campaign in the Western Desert. I have not read a more vivid account of the terror and misery caused by a retreat in which no one knew where he was going or what he was doing." On a more literary level, Vernon Fane in The Sphere proclaimed that "Mr Wallis not only seems to understand what his characters are up to but understands a good deal about that great peril of wartime: boredom. His dialogue is lively and revealing and his observation acute...The author is at his most inspired, though, when dealing with the mysteries of Army directives. Here he is good enough to send a cold, retrospective shiver down the spine."

His second novel, Paved with Gold, was published in 1959 in Britain, and under the variant title A Girl with Class in the US in 1960. It is the satirical story of two ambitious working-class people, Tom and Carole, whose affair is put to the test in post-war London's freed-up and booming world of make or break. Philip Oakes in the Observer said that it was a "shrewd, funny and absorbing story of young lovers – both hauling themselves up the social ladder by way of big business – whose affair is mangled by a takeover bid. Clearly written by someone in love with London (including the City) and whose ear is keen enough to catch the whimpers beneath the post-war boom."

His third novel, and his most famous, was Only Lovers Left Alive, published in 1964. It is an eerily dystopian novel which asks the reader to imagine Britain taken over by teenagers. All the adults have done away with themselves by taking 'Easiway' suicide pills. The world immediately begins to crumble and shortage of all kinds leads to warfare. This updated echo of Lord of the Flies by William Golding is presented by Wallis in contemporary slang and a notably vivid, if dark, style. The new fiction reviewer in The Times said that the "anti-social helmeted figures on the motorcycles, riding on their quests to plunder and attacking one another's strongholds, one of which is Windsor Castle, have a quality oddly like Malory's, and Mr. Wallis obviously enjoys drawing the parallel between his youngsters thrown on their own resources, learning how to live in the ruins of the sophisticated adult world, and the story of mankind settling down in the west after the barbarian invasions of the dark ages." The British first edition of the novel, published by Anthony Blond, has an era-defining, evocative staged wraparound jacket photograph by Bruce Fleming. In 1966 it was announced that The Rolling Stones would make their film debuts in a motion picture of the novel to be directed by Nicholas Ray and produced by Allen Klein and Andrew Loog Oldham. The film was never made.

His last novel, published in 1971, was The Bad Luck Girl. The main character, Celestine, escapes from a remand home at the age of sixteen, and contrives to get herself smuggled aboard a small freighter bound for a South American island by the lustful crew. The story echoes maritime folklore in its fulfilment of an ancient seagoing superstition – a woman aboard ship is bad luck. Wallis pictures Celestine, in all her co-operative but ruthless manipulation, as the selfish sailors' secret nemesis.

== Final years ==
After a spell in north London in the 1960s, Wallis worked as a teacher at Earls Colne Grammar School, teaching English and French from 1971 until its closure in 1975. He died in 1990.

== Bibliography ==
- Tram-stop by the Nile Heinemann (1958)
- Paved with Gold Heinemann (1959) published in the United States under the title A Girl with Class Coward McCann (1960)
- Only Lovers Left Alive Blond (1964) (US – Dutton (1964)), Valancourt Books (2015)
- The Bad Luck Girl Macmillan (1971)
