= Richard de Klerk =

Canadian actor

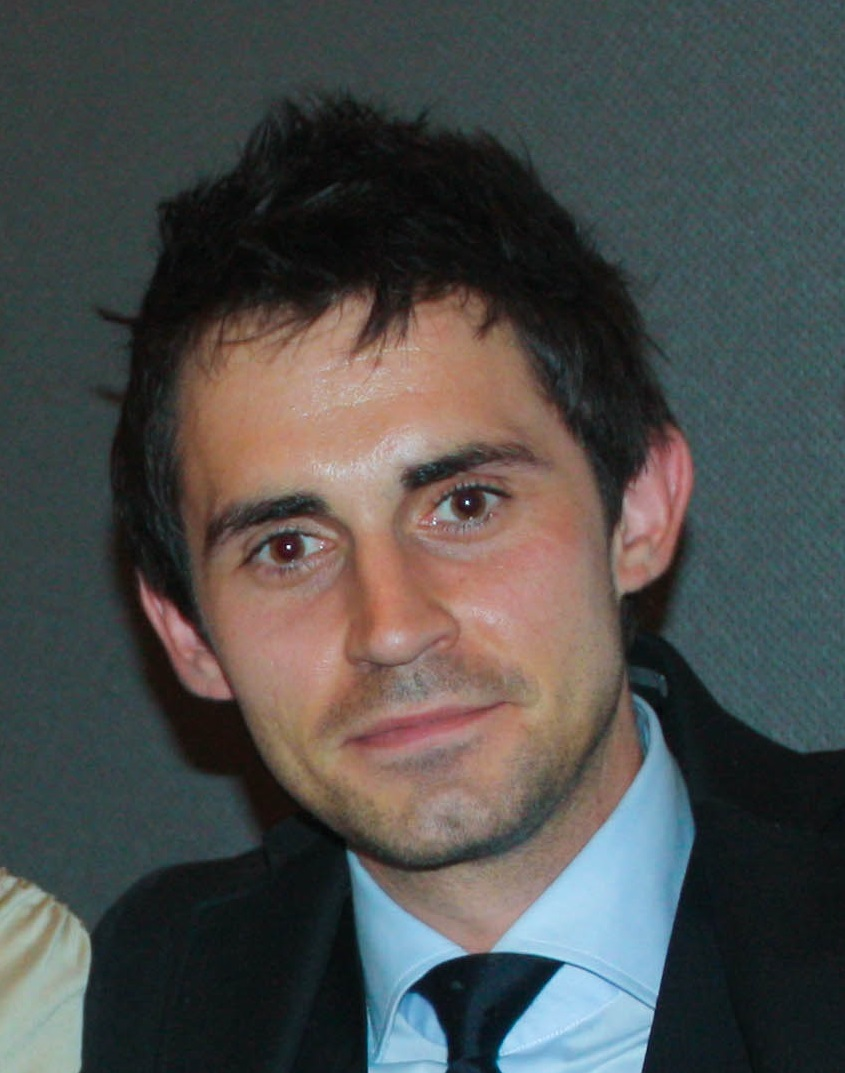
- Born: Vancouver, British Columbia, Canada
- Occupation: Actor
- Years active: 1998–present
- Known for: Repeaters
- Spouse: Cara Gee (m. 2019)

Richard de Klerk is a Canadian actor and producer, known for his work in independent Canadian films. His filmography includes Repeaters, Cole, Fathers & Sons, Bang Bang You're Dead, Mr. Rice's Secret and CBGB.

== Early life and education ==
De Klerk was born in Vancouver. His father, Gerry de Klerk is a businessman from the Netherlands and his mother, Irene Nelson, is Canadian. He has a sister named Melanie, who works as an assignment editor with Global National. While living in Europe, he attended the American School of The Hague. In his late teenage years, he moved back to Canada. There, he studied at Lyric School of Acting in Vancouver. De Klerk has stated that he also holds a European Union passport.

== Career ==
He has over 40 roles in films, short films, and television films and series.

=== Television ===
He appeared as Will Scarlett in the film Beyond Sherwood Forest opposite Erica Durance and Julian Sands, guest starred in The 4400 and the Andie Macdowell series Cedar Cove. His other television works include recurring roles in Strange Empire, Reign and Motive.

=== Film ===
For the film Beijing, New York (2015) (original title 北京，紐約), which also starred Lin Chi-ling and was shown at a number of festivals, he won three awards in 2016, including Barcelona Planet Film Festival Jury Prize for Best Actor and IndieFEST Film Awards Award Of Excellence for Best Lead Actor. He was nominated for three Leo Awards, including Best Lead Performance by a Male in a Feature Length Drama for Cole in 2010. De Klerk worked with director Carl Bessai on several films. He starred in Part of the Game, 2004 film, for which he won Hertfordshire Film Festival Jury Award for Best Actor.

In August 2017, Richard, together with Rampart Films Inc. and several members of his family were sued. A notice of civil claim in BC Supreme Court was filed by Fred and Katarina Kranz for fraud and unjust enrichment towards Richard's father Gerry de Klerk and mother Irene Nelson, and against Richard and his sister Melanie DeKlerk for conversion and civil conspiracy. The claimants, Fred and Katarina Kranz claim they have lent Gerry de Klerk and his companies more than $23 million, and allegedly were repaid "from other funds they themselves provided to Gerry in relation to other investments." They also claim that more than $1.2 million remains unpaid for the film loans.

== Personal life ==
De Klerk married Cara Gee, who played his wife on the CBC television series Strange Empire, in 2019.

== Filmography ==
=== Film ===
Year	Title	Role	Notes
1999	Mr. Rice's Secret	Simon	
2002	Bang Bang You're Dead	Jessie	
2004	Part of the Game	Robert	
2006	Crossed	Mickey	
2009	Cole	Cole	
2010	Repeaters	Michael Weeks	
2010	Fathers & Sons	Leonard	
2013	CBGB	Taxi	
2015	Beijing, New York	Joe Herron	
2018	Anthem of a Teenage Prophet	Lance	
2020	Alone Wolf	Jonathan	

=== Television ===
Year	Title	Role	Notes
1998	Viper	Todd Doyle	Episode: "Hot Potato"
1999	Cold Squad	Joey Harris	2 episodes
1999, 2001	Stargate SG-1	Dominic / Joe	2 episodes
2000	So Weird	Jordan	Episode: "Avatar"
2000	Frankie & Hazel	Carmine, Pup	Television film
2000	Andromeda	Mapes	Episode: "To Loose the Fateful Lightning"
2004	Alienated	Kent	Episode: "Sexual People"
2005	The 4400	Evan	Episode: "Voices Carry"
2005	The Engagement Ring	Young Nick	Television film
2006	Killer Instinct	Jerry	Episode: "Fifteen Minutes of Flame"
2006	Saved	Young Man in Bar	Episode: "Living Dead"
2006	Totally Awesome	Werewolf / Nick	Television film
2007, 2015	Supernatural	Kit Verson / Scott Carey	2 episodes
2008	Renegadepress.com	Rick	Episode: "Lost and Found"
2009	Beyond Sherwood Forest	Will Scarlet	Television film
2011	Sanctuary	U.S. Sergeant	Episode: "Normandy"
2013	The Listener	Zack Gladstone	Episode: "House of Horror"
2013	Cedar Cove	Lenny Wilson	Episode: "Help Wanted"
2013	Garage Sale Mysteries	Sam	Episode: "Garage Sale Mystery"
2014	Signed, Sealed, Delivered	Jonathan Walker IV	Episode: "The Treasure Box"
2014–2015	Strange Empire	Jeremiah Loving	4 episodes
2015	Motive	Robert Montgomery	5 episodes
2016	Reign	Federico de Toledo	2 episodes
2017	Designated Survivor	Carlton Mackie	Episode: "Outbreak"
2018	The Queen of Sin	Jack Wickley	Television film
2020	The Detectives	David Dickinson	Episode: "Project Prism"
2025	Twisted Metal	Mr. Grimm	9 episodes
