= Sonic Reducer =

Single by Dead Boys

from the album Young Loud and Snotty
- B-side: "Down in Flames"
- Released: November 1977 (US); December 1977 (UK)
- Recorded: 1977
- Studio: Electric Lady, New York City
- Genre: Punk rock
- Length: 3:05
- Label: Sire
- Songwriters: Cheetah Chrome; David Thomas
- Producer: Genya Ravan

Dead Boys singles chronology
"Sonic Reducer" (1977)	"Tell Me" (1978)

"Sonic Reducer" is a punk rock song written by Cheetah Chrome and David Thomas during their tenure in Rocket from the Tombs, which made its recorded debut on the Dead Boys 1977 album Young, Loud and Snotty with lyrics rewritten by Stiv Bators.

The song has been covered by Guns N' Roses, Overkill, Pearl Jam, Foetus, Dozer, Leeway, Die Toten Hosen, Bad Religion, and Saves the Day. The song appeared on the UK compilation album New Wave.

It was sampled on the Beastie Boys song "An Open Letter to NYC" on their 2004 album To the 5 Boroughs. It is also featured on the skateboarding video game Tony Hawk's Underground 2 and Tony Hawk's American Wasteland (by Saves the Day). It was performed by fictional punk rock outfit Hard Core Logo in Bruce McDonald's 1996 mockumentary Hard Core Logo.

== Formats and track listing ==
US 7-inch single

1. "Sonic Reducer" – 3:04
2. "Down in Flames" – 2:13

UK 7- and 12-inch singles

1. "Sonic Reducer"
2. "Little Girl"
3. "Down in Flames"
