= Rocket from the Tombs =

American rock band

- Also known as: RFTT
- Origin: Cleveland, Ohio, United States
- Genres: Proto-punk; garage rock; punk rock; hard rock
- Years active: 1974–1975, 2003–2017
- Spinoffs: Pere Ubu; Dead Boys
- Past members: David Thomas; Craig Willis Bell; Steve Mehlman; Gary Siperko; Buddy Akita; Peter Laughner; Chris Cuda; Glen "Thunderhand" Hach; Charlie Weiner; Tom Foolery; Johnny Blitz; Cheetah Chrome; Richard Lloyd

Rocket from the Tombs (or RFTT) was an American rock band originally active from mid-1974 to mid-1975 in Cleveland, Ohio, United States. The band featured David Thomas and was reconstituted several times with various line-ups starting in 2003.

The band was little known during its original run, although it was later heralded as an important protopunk group. Various members would achieve renown in Pere Ubu and the Dead Boys. Billy Bob Hargus wrote, "The sound of the Rockets is much more ferocious than Ubu or the Dead Boys."

== Band history ==
The band played their first show June 16, 1974, at the Viking Saloon in downtown Cleveland. The original line-up was David Thomas (playing as "Crocus Behemoth", vocals, bass), Kim Zonneville (bass, vocals), Glenn "Thunderhand" Hach (guitar, vocals) and Tom "Foolery" Clements (drums).

There was some fluctuation of the group's personnel, but what has come to be known as the "classic" lineup included Thomas, Peter Laughner, Craig Willis Bell (a.k.a. Darwin Layne), Gene O'Connor (a.k.a. Cheetah Chrome), and Johnny Madansky (a.k.a. Johnny Blitz).

When RFTT disbanded, the members split and formed three musical groups:

- O'Connor and Madansky joined singer Stiv Bators (who made a guest appearance on-stage at the last RFTT show) to form Frankenstein, which later morphed into the Dead Boys, a more straightforward punk rock group.
- Laughner and Thomas went on to form the more experimental Pere Ubu with bassist Tim Wright (RFTT's soundman). Laughner died in 1977, of acute pancreatitis brought on by years of drinking and drug use.
- Bell moved to Connecticut and started a band called Saucers.

All three bands used songs first written or performed by Rocket From The Tombs as parts of their repertoires: the Dead Boys were known for "Ain't It Fun," "What Love Is," "Down in Flames," "Caught With the Meat in Your Mouth" (done by RFTT as "I'm Never Gonna Kill Myself Again") and "Sonic Reducer"; Pere Ubu went on to reinterpret "Final Solution," "Life Stinks" and "30 Seconds Over Tokyo"; Saucers played "Muckraker”, and “Frustration”.

Rocket From The Tombs never recorded an album in their initial incarnation, but various live recordings and demos circulated occasionally as bootlegs. Most of these were collected on a single CD by Smog Veil records, and titled The Day the Earth Met the Rocket from the Tombs (2002).

San Diego punk band Rocket from the Crypt chose their name after hearing Rocket from the Tombs bootlegs.

== Reunion ==
The Smog Veil Records CD rekindled interest in Rocket From The Tombs, and they reformed in 2003 with original members Thomas, Chrome, and Bell, joined by Richard Lloyd (guitar), and Steve Mehlman (drums). Some claim that decades earlier, when Lloyd briefly quit the New York-based band Television, Laughner was seriously considered as his replacement. However, on his website richardlloyd.com, Richard Lloyd asserts that Laughner "was never even close to being in Television, unless I was way out of town for a month, and I don't think so."

On June 10, 2003 they played their first live radio concert since the 1970s (when two shows live from the Agora club aired on WMMS) on Brian Turner's program on WFMU.

In 2004, Smog Veil and Morphius released Rocket Redux, consisting of Rocket From The Tombs originals performed in studio by the 2003 lineup. It received mostly positive reviews; one critic declared that Redux "never sounds like a complacent reunion record, and in a way, I suppose it's not really a reunion record in the first place so much as it's a debut album, played with all the hunger and fire of a band eager to make their mark on the world."

In 2006, Thomas announced that the band had again reunited, this time to work on new material. The band toured the United States in the summer of 2006 and debuted some new songs, but no further activity occurred until 2009 when the band contributed a song to the Mark Mulcahy tribute album Ciao My Shining Star: The Songs of Mark Mulcahy. An album of new material, Barfly was released on September 13, 2011 with a tour scheduled to begin in November 2011. Lloyd was replaced in the band before the tour launch, and Cheetah Chrome announced his departure from Rocket From the Tombs on December 30, 2011, leaving David Thomas and Craig Willis Bell as the only remaining original members.

In November 2015, the band released Black Record.

== Discography ==
=== Albums ===
- Rocket Redux (2004)
- Barfly (2011)
- Black Record (2015)

=== Live albums ===
- When It's Too Late To Die Young (download only) (2011)
- Extermination Night (download only) (2012)
- Strychnine (download only) (2012)
- That's What I Call Rock Music (download only) (2022)

=== Other albums ===
- A Night Of Heavy Music (bootleg cassette) (1975)
- Life Stinks (1990)
- The Day the Earth Met the Rocket from the Tombs (2002)
- Ciao My Shining Star: The Songs of Mark Mulcahy (2009)

=== Single ===
- "I Sell Soul" / "Romeo & Juliet" single (6 April 2010)

== Bibliography ==
- Clinton Heylin, From the Velvets to the Voidoids: A Pre-Punk History for a Post-Punk World (1993), Penguin Books, ISBN 0-14-017970-4
