= Gracious! =

British progressive rock band

Gracious were a British progressive rock band that existed from 1967 to 1971, during which time they released two studio albums: Gracious! (1970, Vertigo/Capitol) and This Is... (1972, Philips). They reunited in the 1990s and released Echo (1996).

== History ==
Singer Paul 'Sandy' Davis and guitarist Alan Cowderoy formed a band, Satans Disciples, while at school in Esher, Surrey. Davis was the drummer and vocalist, and Cowderoy played lead; two other school friends played bass and rhythm (Keith Ireland). In 1968, Martin Kitcat and Mark Laird joined on Hohner electric piano and bass respectively. Davis was still drumming as well as singing, but Robert Lipson, who played in a rival Esher band, agreed to join, allowing Davis to take the front of stage.

The band's early sound was influenced by Cream and the British blues movement, and one of their first professional recordings was a cover of a John Mayall song. They supported The Who on a tour in 1968, by which time they had moved away from their blues roots and developed a more pop flavoured identity, landing a deal to record an album under the direction of producer Norrie Paramor. Actual production duties were assigned to Tim Rice, who then worked for Paramor. Sessions at a Denmark Street studio produced ten tracks, an eclectic mix of Vanilla Fudge-influenced covers and The Moody Blues-meets-The Beatles styled originals penned by Davis and Kitcat. Two tracks were released on the Polydor single "Beautiful" b/w "Oh What A Lovely Rain", but nothing else from the sessions was heard until 1994, when four more songs appeared on the Renaissance Buried Treasures compilation. They changed their name to Gracious, coined by their first manager David Booth. The exclamation mark was added when the first album's sleeve was prepared. Their third gig under the new name saw them sharing the bill with King Crimson, on 11 July 1969 at Beckenham's Mistrale Club. Lipson would comment later, "that changed our lives. Martin got a Mellotron and we were off!"

In 1969, Gracious toured Germany for six weeks, during which roadie and driver Tim Wheatley replaced Laird. On their return from Germany, Gracious played the gig circuit in the UK and Brian Shepherd, then head of Vertigo Records, came to see them and offered them a record deal. The first album was recorded at Philips Records' London studios near Marble Arch. Cowderoy recalled, "When we first went into the studio to record 'The Dream', we genuinely expected to record it in small segments. However our producer Hugh Murphy insisted we play it in one take in the studio, and do any overdubs afterwards... The first album, although less mature than the second, had more direction and was more focused - although 'Fugue In D Minor' was always an oddity".

The band's self-titled debut album received a three-star rating from AllMusic, whose reviewer Paul Collins described it as "a fine debut, and it presaged the superb second effort that was to follow."

The band wrote long pieces, starting with a Davis/Kitcat-composed opera called "Opus 41", based on the "Four Season", which was never recorded. Even their shorter numbers were often 10 minutes in length when played live. The centrepiece of the band's second LP, recorded early 1971 at Olympic, was the 25-minute suite "Supernova", inspired by the shortest ghost story ever written: "the last man alive on earth was sitting at home when suddenly there was a tap at the window". The second album was entitled This Is..., but it was originally going to be called Supernova. However, Cowderoy explains, "Vertigo weren't having so much success with the more progressive groups, and it wasn't deemed commercial enough for release. It was subsequently released on the Philips international label as part of a 'This Is...' series at a budget price. The playing on that second album was much better, but it was released after the band had split up, so there was absolutely no publicity, and therefore no media attention".

On the band's demise, Cowderoy explains: "Robert left first. We carried on with a new drummer [Chris Brayne], but the magic and camaraderie were dissolving. Martin was next to go". The resulting quartet toured Germany in the Summer of 1971, with Davis handling the Mellotron parts as well as singing. The band suffered from money troubles as well as personal and musical differences within the band. Lipson recounted, "I think we three and Martin and Sandy were very split. We even went to gigs separately - we'd just meet on stage".

After the split, Lipson "didn't join another band, I went into the family business, got married, and did all those peer pressure things. I missed it desperately. We had a reunion about a year later at the Marquee [April 6th, 1972], and it really hurt going home after that gig". Cowderoy went on to work for Decca Records, Vertigo Records, Stiff Records, A&M and various other executive positions. Kitcat gave up playing and eventually moved to America. According to Lipson, "he hasn't touched a keyboard since, and he's sold his gear". Wheatley joined the band Taggett, which recorded an album for EMI produced by Tony Hicks. Subsequently he launched his own studio, and also played on one of Sandy Davis's solo albums. Davis had sung on Jesus Christ Superstar, which Tim Rice got him involved as a session man. He then played in a pub duo with Mike Read, who later became a well known BBC DJ, and was one of two drummers in Guildford band Headwaiter. Before Davis ultimately moved to Germany, he and Wheatley recorded material together, along with Rob Townsend, keyboard player Billy Livsey and the horn section from The Rumour.

In 1995 Tim Wheatley and Robert Lipson began work on a new Gracious album, following approaches from a Japanese record company, with guest participation from Alan Cowderoy. They released a CD entitled Echo in 1996, with Sev Lewkowicz (keyboards, lead vocals and guitar), Stuart Turner (guitars) and Richard Ashworth (lyrics). The songs were written by Lewkowicz, Wheatley, Lipson and Ashworth, and the album was produced by Lewkowicz and Wheatley. It was released by Centaur Discs.

== Band members ==
- Paul "Sandy" Davis: lead vocals, 12-string guitar, percussion
- Alan Cowderoy: guitar, backing vocals, percussion
- Martin Kitcat: Mellotron, organ, Hohner pianet, piano, backing vocals
- Tim Wheatley: bass, backing vocals, percussion
- Robert Lipson: drums

=== Line-up of album Echo (1996) ===
- Tim Wheatley: bass, guitars, backing vocals
- Robert Lipson: drums
- Alan Cowderoy: guitar (on Oil Pressure)
- Sev Lewkowicz: keyboards, lead vocals, guitar
- Stuart Turner: guitars

== Discography ==
Singles

- "Beautiful" / "What A Lovely Rain" (1969)
- "Once On A Windy Day" / "Fugue in 'D' Minor" (1970)

Albums

- Gracious! (1970)

"Introduction" / "Heaven" / "Hell" // "Fugue in 'D' Minor" / "Dream"

- This is...Gracious!! (1971)

"Super Nova (Arrival of the Traveller)" / "Blood Red Sun" / "Say Goodbye to Love" / "Prepare (To Meet thy Maker)" // "C.B.S." / "What's Come To Be" / "Blue Skies And Alibis" / "Hold Me Down"

- Echo (1996)

"Echo" / "Winter" / "Homecoming" / "Cynic's Gate" / "Autumn" / "Mangroove" / "Summer" / "Faith" / "Spring" / "Oil Pressure"

== Re-releases ==
In the 1990s, the German label Repertoire Records reissued the first LP, and the US label Renaissance reissued This Is..., which restored the originally intended running order of the "Supernova" suite (because of time and space limitations of the LP format, a section of the epic "What's Come To Be" had been removed and relocated out of context to side two as a separate song). It also included the non-album single "Once on a Windy Day" as a bonus track. Some pre-production sessions for the Renaissance CD issue of "This Is... were overseen by singer-songwriter Kevin Gilbert at his studio in Pasadena, California. During this time, the custom made double-lead 'Gracious mellotron' owned by Martin Kitcat was brought to Gilbert's studio and eventually purchased by Bigelf keyboardist Damon Fox, who said during an interview with Bill Kopp of musoscribe.com: "Kitcat was the first person to put 'lead' sounds on both [tape] sides [of his Mellotron keys]. Most bands had Mk II's [and] used them as they were sold: the rhythm sounds on one side, and then flutes, strings, horns -- the lead sounds -- on the right side. But Martin was the first guy to contact the Bradley brothers [UK-based Mellotron manufacturers] and have his made custom, with lead sound on both sides." Four tracks (three Davis/Kitcat originals and a cover of "I Put A Spell On You") from the aborted 1968 recording sessions were included on a Renaissance CD compilation, Buried Treasures (1994), along with similarly unheard material by Touch and Stray Dog.
