= Vladimir Cuk =

Croatian actor and basketball player

Personal information
- Born: September 1, 1975 (age 51) Zagreb, Yugoslavia (Now Zagreb, Croatia)
- Listed height: 7 ft 0 in (2.13 m)
- Listed weight: 250 lb (113 kg)

Career information
- College: James Madison (1991–1994)
- NBA draft: 1994: undrafted
- Position: Center

Vladimir Cuk (born September 1, 1975) is a Croatian actor and former basketball player.

Cuk, notable for his tall stature at 7 feet 0 inches (2.13 m) nicknamed "The tallest actor in Hollywood" has appeared in several movies, television shows, commercials and video games in the 1990s and 2000s. Cuk was born on September 1, 1975, in Zagreb, Croatia. He made his way to acting after a 22-game college basketball career at James Madison University between 1991 and 1994 averaging 0.3 points per game.

Cuk got his first acting role as Lurch in the 1996 basketball film Celtic Pride starring Damon Wayans and Daniel Stern. Cuk then received more acting roles after that appearing in the 1997 movie The 6th Man starring Damon's brother Marlon Wayans. Cuk has also appeared on an episode of The Parkers in 2002.

Cuk has been featured in several commercials for companies such as Nissan, Coinstar and General Electric.

== Filmography ==
- Celtic Pride (1996) – Lurch
- The 6th Man (1997) – Zigi Hrbacek
- The Parkers (2002), 1 episode
- Cedric the Entertainer presents (2002), 1 episode
- James Bond 007: Everything or Nothing (2003)
- Forbidden Warrior (2005) – Tall Tall
