= Hilly Kristal =

American club owner and musician (1931–2007)

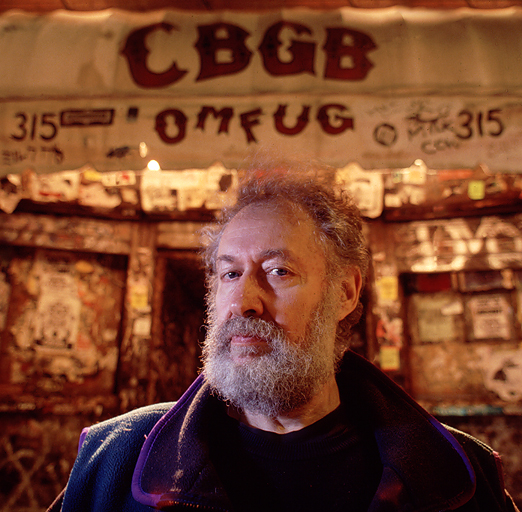
- Kristal in New York City in 1992
- Born: September 23, 1931; New York City, New York, U.S.
- Died: August 28, 2007 (aged 75); New York City, New York, U.S.
- Education: Settlement Music School
- Occupations: Club owner; manager; musician
- Known for: Owner of CBGB nightclub
- Children: 2

Hillel Kristal (September 23, 1931 – August 28, 2007) was an American club owner, manager and musician who was the owner of the New York City club CBGB, which opened in 1973 and closed in 2006 over a rent dispute.

== Early years ==
Kristal was born in New York City in 1931, the son of Russian Jewish immigrants.

His father, Shamai Kristal, was a Russian pogrom survivor. Shamai, whose namesake was Shammai, named his son after Shammai's contemporary, Hillel the Elder. His family moved to Hightstown, New Jersey when he was an infant. He studied music from a young age and eventually attended the Settlement Music School in Philadelphia. He graduated from Hightstown High School in 1949. Kristal also spent a period of time in the Marines.

== Venturing into music ==
He moved back to New York City, where he worked as a singer, appearing on stage in the men's choral group at Radio City Music Hall. He later became the manager of the Village Vanguard, a jazz club in Greenwich Village, where he booked Miles Davis and other musicians.

He married in 1951 and had two children: Lisa Kristal Burgman and Mark Dana Kristal.

In 1966 he and Ron Delsener co-founded the Rheingold Central Park Music Festival, sponsored by Rheingold Beer. By 1968, Delsener had changed beer sponsors to Schaefer and Kristal was no longer involved. The festival took place every year until 1976 in Central Park and featured musicians from a range of genres.

== CBGB ==
In 1970, Kristal opened a bar in the Bowery section of New York called "Hilly's on the Bowery", which closed within a couple of years. Then in December 1973, he created "CBGB and OMFUG", an abbreviation for the kinds of music he intended to feature there (the letters stood for "Country, Bluegrass, Blues and Other Music For Uplifting Gourmandizers").

The club, eventually called simply CBGB, became known as the starting point for the careers of such punk rock and new wave acts as the Ramones, Talking Heads, Patti Smith, Television and Blondie. Kristal also briefly managed Dead Boys and The Shirts, two bands that frequently performed at his club.

CBGB featured many famous musicians over the years and remained very popular until its closing in 2006 due to a personal disagreement with the landlord, who opted not to renew the lease. For a short while after the closing, Kristal considered moving the club to Las Vegas.

A film, CBGB, about Kristal and the origins of the club, was released in October 2013. Alan Rickman portrayed Kristal in the film.

== Death ==
Kristal died on August 28, 2007, from complications of lung cancer, aged 75.
