= Tell Me (Rolling Stones song) =

- US picture sleeve

Single by the Rolling Stones

from the album The Rolling Stones
- B-side: "I Just Want to Make Love to You"
- Released: 12 June 1964 (US)
- Recorded: January–February 1964
- Studio: Regent Sound, London
- Genre: Pop rock; Merseybeat
- Length: 4:05 (album version); 2:47 (single version)
- Label: London
- Songwriter: Jagger/Richards
- Producer: Andrew Loog Oldham

The Rolling Stones US singles chronology
"Not Fade Away" (1964)	"Tell Me" (1964)	"It's All Over Now" (1964)

"Tell Me (You're Coming Back)" is a song by the English rock band the Rolling Stones, featured on their 1964 self-titled album (subtitled and often called England's Newest Hit Makers in the US). It became the first A-side single written by Jagger/Richards to be released, although not in the United Kingdom. The single reached number 24 in the United States (becoming their first top 40 hit there) and the top 40 in several other countries.

== Background ==
Written by singer Mick Jagger and guitarist Keith Richards, "Tell Me" is a pop ballad. In a song review for AllMusic, critic Richie Unterberger commented, "It should be pointed out ... that the Rolling Stones, even in 1964, were more versatile and open toward non-blues-rooted music than is often acknowledged by critics." The Rolling Stones' two previous singles bear out this observation: one had been the Lennon–McCartney-penned "I Wanna Be Your Man" (later recorded by the Beatles as well); another was Buddy Holly's "Not Fade Away".

Jagger said in a 1995 interview with Rolling Stone magazine: "['Tell Me'] is very different from doing those R&B covers or Marvin Gaye covers and all that. There's a definite feel about it. It's a very pop song, as opposed to all the blues songs and the Motown covers, which everyone did at the time."

The song's lyrics are a glimpse of a failed relationship and the singer's attempt to win back the girl's love:

I want you back again
I want your love again
I know you find it hard to reason with me
But this time it's different, darling, you'll see

Unterberger notes, "When [Jagger and Richards] began to write songs, they were usually not derived from the blues, but were often surprisingly fey, slow, Mersey-type pop numbers ... 'Tell Me' was quite acoustic-based, with a sad, almost dispirited air. After quiet lines about the end of the love affair, the tempo and melody both brighten".

== Recording and release ==
"Tell Me" was recorded in London in January and February 1964; versions both with and without Ian Stewart's piano were cut. Jagger said: "Keith was playing 12-string and singing harmonies into the same microphone as the 12-string. We recorded it in this tiny studio in the West End of London called Regent Sound, which was a demo studio. I think the whole of that album was recorded in there."

Richards said in a 1971 interview with Rolling Stone, "'Tell Me' ... was a dub. Half those records were dubs on that first album, that Mick and I and Charlie and I'd put a bass on or maybe Bill was there and he'd put a bass on. 'Let's put it down while we remember it,' and the next thing we know is, 'Oh look, track 8 is that dub we did a couple months ago.' That's how little control we had."

Early pressings of the UK release of the debut album mistakenly included the piano-less version of "Tell Me" (the 2:52 version); all subsequent releases have featured the version with piano. The full-length (4:05 or 4:06) recording of this piano version, which appeared on the standard UK LP after the mistake was corrected, has an abrupt ending before the performance of the song finishes. Most other LP and CD versions of the UK debut album – as well as the Stones' debut US album, originally subtitled but later officially called England's Newest Hit Makers – contain an edited version of this recording, which fades out at around 3:48.

In June 1964, a much shorter edit of "Tell Me", 2:47 in duration, was released as a single in the United States and peaked at number 24 for two weeks, lasting on the Billboard Hot 100 for a total of 10 weeks. Cash Box described it as "a haunting rock-a-cha-cha that picks up steam each time around." The B-side was a cover of the Willie Dixon song "I Just Wanna Make Love to You". In The Netherlands, the full-length recording with the abrupt ending was released as a single in October 1964, peaking at number 3 in the music charts. A cover of Chuck Berry's "Come On" was on the B-side.

The "Tell Me" single was re-released on various Rolling Stones compilation albums, including Big Hits (High Tide and Green Grass), More Hot Rocks (Big Hits & Fazed Cookies), and Singles Collection: The London Years. On most compilations, the 3:48 edit has been used, rather than the 2:47 single edit. For example, although the 1989 edition of Singles Collection: The London Years had the single edit, the 2002 edition has the longer version.

The song was featured in Martin Scorsese's 1973 film Mean Streets.

== Personnel ==
According to authors Philippe Margotin and Jean-Michel Guesdon.

- Mick Jagger – lead vocals
- Keith Richards – 12 string acoustic rhythm guitar, backing vocals
- Brian Jones – electric lead guitar (and solo), tambourine, backing vocals
- Bill Wyman – bass, backing vocals
- Charlie Watts – drums

Additional musicians

- Ian Stewart – piano

== Charts ==
Chart (1964–65)	Peak position
Canada Top Singles (RPM)	7
Belgium (Ultratop 50 Flanders)	1
Netherlands (Single Top 100)	3
Finland (Suomen virallinen lista)	38
Germany (GfK)	22
Sweden (Kvällstoppen)	1
Sweden (Tio i Topp)	1
US Billboard Hot 100	24
US Cashbox Top 100	27
US Record World 100 Top Pops	26

== Cover versions ==
- 1965 – The Termites (not to be confused with the Scottish psychobilly band of the same name, founded in 1985), as a UK single
- 1966 – The Grass Roots, on their first album Where Were You When I Needed You
- 1978 – The Dead Boys, on their second album We Have Come for Your Children
- 1990 – Cassell Webb, on the album Conversations at Dawn, also released as a single
