= Dead Boys =

American punk rock band

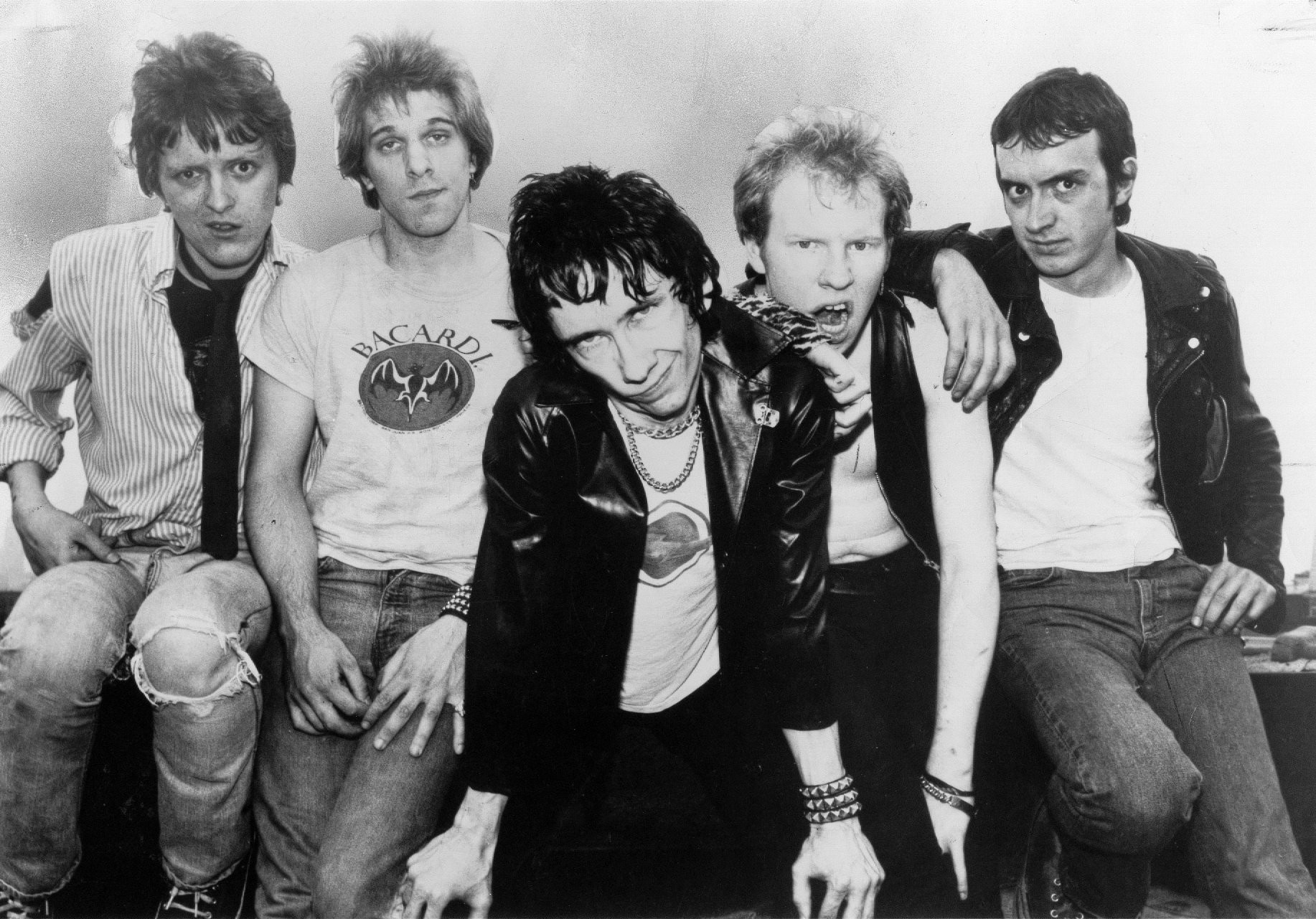
- Dead Boys in 1977. From left: Jimmy Zero, Johnny Blitz, Stiv Bators, Cheetah Chrome, and Jeff Magnum

Background information
- Origin: Cleveland, Ohio, U.S.
- Genre: Punk rock
- Years active: 1975–1980; 1987; 2004–2005; 2017–2026
- Labels: Sire; Bomp!; Revenge; Hell Yeah; Bacchus; Bad Boy; Cold Front; Relativity; Plowboy Records
- Spinoff of: Rocket From the Tombs
- Past members: Cheetah Chrome; Stiv Bators; Johnny Blitz; Jason Kottwitz; Ricky Rat; Jimmy Zero; Jeff Magnum; Jake Hout; Mark Thorn; Monk Burris; Sam Hariss; Scott Churilla

The Dead Boys were an American punk rock band from Cleveland, Ohio. The band was among the first wave of punk, and regarded by many as one of the rowdiest and most violent groups of the era. They were formed in 1975 by vocalist Stiv Bators, rhythm guitarist Jimmy Zero, bassist Jeff Magnum, lead guitarist Cheetah Chrome, and drummer Johnny Blitz—the latter two having splintered from the band Rocket from the Tombs. The original Dead Boys released two studio albums: Young, Loud and Snotty and We Have Come for Your Children.

The Dead Boys were active from 1975 to 1980, briefly reunited a few times in the mid-1980s, and regrouped in 2004 and 2005 for the first time without Bators, who had died in 1990. In September 2017, Chrome and Blitz reunited the band with a new line-up for a 40th anniversary tour along with a new album, Still Snotty: Young, Loud and Snotty at 40, a re-recording of their debut album. This lineup included Chrome and Blitz with vocalist Jake Hout, guitarist Jason "Ginchy" Kottwitz and bassist Ricky Rat. Hout quit in November 2024 over plans for a new Dead Boys album with an AI-synthesized Bators vocal.

== History ==
=== Formation and 1970s punk rock era ===
Chrome and Blitz joined Cleveland proto-punk band Rocket From The Tombs in late 1974. Chrome invited his friend Steve Bator (a.k.a. Stiv Bators) on stage to sing a few songs at a show in August 1975. This caused most of the other band members to walk off stage and they broke up. Shortly thereafter, Bators, Chrome, and Blitz recruited Magnum and Zero to form Frankenstein who recorded demos in October but they broke up in January 1976.

In July 1976, the band's members moved to New York City at the encouragement of Joey Ramone, the Ramones' lead singer. Taking the name Dead Boys from a line in the RFTT song "Down in Flames", the Dead Boys quickly gained notoriety for their outrageous live performances. Lewd gestures and profanity were the norm. They frequently played at the rock club CBGB (the band was briefly managed by club owner Hilly Kristal) and in 1977 they released their debut album, Young, Loud and Snotty, produced by Genya Ravan. Their song "Sonic Reducer" is often regarded as one of the classics of the punk genre, with AllMusic calling it "one of punk's great anthems."

Their second album, We Have Come for Your Children, produced by Felix Pappalardi, was recorded in Miami in early 1978 and released later that year. Sire Records pressed the group to change their look and sound to appeal more to the U.S. mainstream (which had yet to embrace punk on the level seen in the UK) and this contributed to Dead Boys breaking up in 1979.

Shortly after returning from Miami, Johnny Blitz and a group of his friends got into an altercation on Second Avenue in Manhattan which led to Blitz being stabbed in the chest five times. While he was recovering in the hospital, a benefit was held for him at which the Dead Boys performed with John Belushi and former New York Dolls and Johnny Thunders & the Heartbreakers drummer Jerry Nolan filling in for Blitz on drums.

Several 1979 performances were featured in the 1980 film, D.O.A.. A few months after the breakup, the band had to reunite to record a live album and thus fulfill their contractual obligations. To exact revenge on the label, Bators purposely sang off-mic and the resulting recording was unusable. When the material eventually surfaced on Bomp! Records, Bators had re-recorded the vocals in a studio. They booked a 1979 - 80 tour but Magnum, then Chrome, Blitz and finally Zero left, leaving Bators as the only original member. He recorded his first solo album with the final (until later reunions) Dead Boys lineup.

=== Bators' and Chrome's subsequent careers ===
In 1979, Bators recorded some singles including a cover of "It's Cold Outside" by the Choir and a solo album, Disconnected, for BOMP! Records. Bators later joined The Wanderers with former members of Sham 69 and shortly thereafter formed Lords of the New Church with Brian James from The Damned and Dave Tregunna from Sham 69. They released several albums on IRS Records, including the keyboard-laden hit single "Open Your Eyes" and a cover of "Like a Virgin".

After the Dead Boys dissolved, Cheetah Chrome played around New York City (mostly at Max's Kansas City) doing shows with The Stilettos as well as his own band Cheetah Chrome and the Casualties. He recorded a single for ORK Records, "Still Wanna Die" / "Take Me Home", recorded with Atlantic Records co-founder Herb Abramson. Shortly thereafter, he played on Ronnie Spector's debut solo album Siren. He appeared on several recordings during the 1980s, and rejoined the Dead Boys for their ill-fated reunions of the late 1980s.

In 2003, after the release of The Day the Earth Met the Rocket from the Tombs, Chrome reformed Rocket from the Tombs with David Thomas, Craig Bell, with Steve Mehlman (Pere Ubu) on drums and Richard Lloyd (Television) replacing the late Peter Laughner. This reincarnation of the group toured in 2003 and 2006.

In summer 2003, they entered the studio to record some of the band's old material for the first time. The recordings were released as Rocket Redux. In 2005, the members of Rocket from the Tombs flew to Germany to headline one night (Buzzcocks headlined the other) of the International Punk Kongress in Kassel; then, in 2006, they reconvened in Cleveland, Ohio to write material for a new record. This material became the single "I Sell Soul"/"Romeo and Juliet", released in 2010, and the album Barfly, released in 2011.

In early 2010, Chrome formed a short lived band called Batusis with Syl Sylvain of the New York Dolls. They recorded at least 10 songs but released only four on an EP. In September 2010, Cheetah Chrome: A Dead Boy's Tale from the Front Lines of Punk Rock was published. At the end of a week-long Rocket from the Tomb tour in December 2011, Chrome announced to the band that he had decided to stop touring extensively after 2012. He currently works for Plowboy Records in Nashville, Tennessee, mainly in production and promotion.

=== Reformation, death of Bators, 40th and 50th anniversary tours, death of Chrome ===
The Dead Boys reformed for several gigs in the 1980s. They re-released their first album as Younger, Louder and Snottier in 1989, mastered from a cassette tape of rough mixes, attributed to a young Bob Clearmountain, a studio assistant at the time.

In June 1990, Bators died in France due to injuries sustained after having been hit by a taxi. In September 2004, the remaining members of the band re-formed for a one-off gig in Cleveland. In 2005, they played a benefit show for CBGB and another reunion show on Halloween.

On April 25, 2017, Chrome and Blitz played six shows in Canada as a tribute to the 40th anniversary of Young, Loud and Snotty. The band played the record in its entirety. Chrome and Blitz then announced in 2017 that the band would go on a full reunion tour.

On September 8, 2017, Still Snotty: Young, Loud and Snotty at 40 was released. The album is a re-recording of their debut album and the first studio album by the Dead Boys in 39 years. Along with Chrome and Blitz, the tour and album featured Jason "Ginchy" Kottwitz (Bulemics, Sylvain Sylvain and the Sylvains, Cheetah Chrome solo band) on guitar, Ricky Rat (Trash Brats) on bass, and vocalist Jake Hout from zombie-themed Dead Boys tribute band the Undead Boys.

Chrome said of the tour "(w)ith the 40th anniversary of the Dead Boys on the horizon and a solid band that could interpret and deliver the performance and sound needed to maintain the authenticity of the Dead Boys, I reached out to Johnny Blitz about an anniversary tour and he said yes and we began the journey of what would become Still Snotty. I've been singing the Dead Boys songs myself for 20 years because I couldn't find another singer I trusted enough to hand it to. The first gig with Jake, it was like, 'You got it, man!' I think Stiv would be very proud of our choice." A photobook, Dead Boys 1977: The Lost Photographs of Dave Treat, was also released on September 29, 2017.

On September 13, 2026, Chrome, who was the only remaining original member still with the band, had passed away at the age of 71. The band were planning to do a 50th anniversary tour of their debut album in 2027 however it is unknown if those plans will change following Chrome's death.

== In popular culture ==
In 2013, the American biographical drama film CBGB about the former New York music venue of the same name was released. Bators is portrayed by actor Justin Bartha, best known for his roles in The Hangover films and the National Treasure films, while Rupert Grint, best known for his work in the Harry Potter film series as Ron Weasley, portrays Cheetah Chrome. Chrome also makes a cameo appearance in the film.

== Band members ==
Current members

- Mark Thorn – vocals (2025–present)
- Scott Churilla – drums (2019–present)
- Monk Burris – rhythm guitar (2019–present)
- Sam Hariss – bass (2023–present)

Former members

- Cheetah Chrome (Gene O'Connor) – lead guitar (1976–1979, 1987, 2004–2005, 2017–2026; his death), vocals (2004–2005)
- Stiv Bators (Steve Bator) – vocals (1976–1979, 1987; died 1990)
- Johnny Blitz (John Madansky) – drums (1976–1979, 1987, 2004–2005, 2017–2019)
- Jimmy Zero (William Wilden) – rhythm guitar (1976–1979, 1987, 2004–2005)
- Jeff Magnum (Jeff Halmagy) – bass (1976–1979, 1987, 2004–2005)
- Jason "Ginchy" Kottwitz – rhythm guitar (2017–2019)
- Ricky Rat – bass (2017–2020)
- Jake Hout – vocals (2017–2024)

Timeline

== Discography ==
=== Studio albums ===
- Young, Loud and Snotty (1977, Sire Records)
- We Have Come for Your Children (1978, Sire)
- Still Snotty: Young, Loud and Snotty at 40 (2017, Plowboy Records)
  - Re-recording of Young Loud and Snotty

=== Alternate mix albums ===
- Younger, Louder and Snottier (1997, Bomp!)
  - Original rough mixes of Young, Loud and Snotty
- 3rd Generation Nation (1999, Bad Boy Production)
  - Premix of We Have Come for Your Children

=== Live albums ===
- Night of the Living Dead Boys (1981, Bomp! Records)
- The Return of the Living Dead Boys (1987, Revenge Records) (Import/France)
  - Recorded July 22, 1977 at CBGB
- Liver Than You'll Ever Be (1988, Various Labels) (Import/Various)
  - Recorded December 26, 1987 at the Ritz, NYC
- Twistin' on the Devil's Fork: Live At CBGB's (1998, Hell Yeah Records / Bacchus Records)
  - Recorded October 2, 1977 and August 31, 1978 at CBGB
- All This and More (1998, Bomp!)
  - Recorded in 1977, November 1 in San Francisco and August 7, 22 and April 7 at CBGB

=== Singles ===
==== 7" singles ====
- "Sonic Reducer" (1977, Sire)
- "Tell Me" (1978, Sire)
- "Search and Destroy" (1979, live, Revenge) (Import/France)
- "Buried Gems" (2000, Cold Front Records)

==== 12" singles ====
- "All The Way Down/Nights Are So Long" (1987, Relativity Records 8165) (never released on CD)

=== Video albums ===
- Return Of The Living Dead Boys! Halloween Night 1986 (2008, MVD Visual)
- Live At CBGB's 1977 (2009, MVD Visual)
