= Johnny Blitz =

American drummer

- Born: John Madansky
- Origin: Cleveland, Ohio
- Genres: Proto-punk, punk
- Instrument: Drums

John Madansky, known as Johnny Blitz, is an American punk rock drummer from Cleveland, Ohio, best known as being a member of the bands Dead Boys and Rocket From The Tombs. As a member of the Dead Boys, he helped pioneer the punk rock sound, look and attitude of the mid to late 1970s.

== Early career ==
Johnny Blitz met Cheetah Chrome through a classified ad, and together went on to play small gigs in short-lived bands. In early 1975, Blitz and Chrome were recruited to Rocket From the Tombs. The band broke up within the year. After the break up, Blitz and Chrome teamed up with singer Stiv Bators, rhythm guitarist Jimmy Zero, and bassist Jeff Magnum to form a band called Frankenstein. Eventually, the band renamed themselves Dead Boys and recruited James Sliman to be their manager.

A Boston Globe retrospective described a Dead Boys concert with Blitz on drums:

"The first time I saw Stiv Bators and his band, Dead Boys, was at the Rat in 1976, with about 50 other people. At one point, the bare-chested Bators stuck his head inside the kick drum as drummer Johnny Blitz played. Bators followed by jumping to his feet and slashing his chest with a broken bottle."

— Jim Sullivan, The Boston Globe, June 7, 1990

On April 19, 1978, during his time with Dead Boys, Blitz and a group of friends were in Manhattan's East Village when they became involved in an altercation with a separate group. During the altercation, Blitz was stabbed 5 times. The injury caused him to be hospitalized for months. A four day benefit (Blitz Benefit) was held at CBGB to help with medical bills. Over 30 bands performed and a t-shirt was designed by Arturo Vega.

== Subsequent career ==
After leaving Dead Boys and New York City in 1980, Johny Blitz moved to Toronto with his wife at that time, “B Girl" Lucasta Ross. He joined up with singer/guitarist/songwriter Leo DeLyon (né Leonard Nieberg) and bassist Tommy "Gun" Keating from power punk trio The Blitz (unrelated to Johnny's stage name). Blitz and DeLyon later formed a band called Slaughterhouse with Mark Crosley on bass. The band played Toronto's top clubs and concert venues with a large fan following that guaranteed a packed audience at every gig. Slaughterhouse and Cheetah Chrome's band, Cheetah Chrome and Skells, headlined on Saturday, August 6, 1983 at New York City's CBGB. Dead Boys bassist Jeff Magnum came to the show to see his old bandmates. Later that night, Magnum joined Chrome and Blitz on-stage to play some Dead Boys songs for the show's encore.

After Blitz and Lucasta Ross split, he remarried and fathered three boys. Blitz and DeLyon went on to form The Tribe with keyboard player Polly Gruen and bassist Tommy "Gun" Keating. Together, The Tribe recorded originals that were a little more mainstream. After taking a few years off to focus on family, Blitz, DeLyon, and Keating regrouped back to their power punk three-piece hardcore roots to form Raw Dog. group co-wrote and arranged all original material. They recorded a number of unreleased songs at Comfort Sound and Metalworks studios. These songs included "In From the Cold", "I Like Girls", "Television Religion", "Call of the Wild", "Anxiety", "Kill 'Em All", and many more.

Blitz returned to Cleveland for the Dead Boys reunion gig in 2004 at Cleveland's Beachland Ballroom. The reunion included a question-and-answer session at the Rock and Roll Hall of Fame and Museum. The reunited Dead Boys also performed at CBGB in 2005. Blitz and DeLyon went their separate ways in 2007. Between 2007 and 2012, Blitz continued as a drummer in a number of rock outfits including The Highschool Hookers (2007-2008) and Smash the Hammer (2012).

In September 2017, Blitz and Chrome reunited the Dead Boys with a new lineup for a 40th anniversary tour along with a new album, Still Snotty: Young, Loud and Snotty at 40, a re-recording of their debut album. The new lineup included vocalist Jake Hout, guitarist Jason "Ginchy" Kottwitz and bassist Ricky Rat, alongside Chrome and Blitz.
