= Stiv Bators =

American singer and guitarist (1949–1990)

Background information
- Born: Steven John Bator; October 22, 1949; Youngstown, Ohio, U.S.
- Died: June 3, 1990 (aged 40) Paris, France
- Genres: Punk rock; new wave; gothic rock; power pop
- Occupations: Musician, actor
- Instruments: Vocals, guitar, bass
- Years active: 1974–1990
- Labels: Bomp!, Sire
- Formerly of: Dead Boys; The Lords of the New Church; The Wanderers

Steven John Bator (October 22, 1949 – June 3, 1990), known professionally as Stiv Bator and later as Stiv Bators, was an American punk rock vocalist and guitarist from Youngstown, Ohio. He is best remembered for his bands Dead Boys and the Lords of the New Church.

== Early life ==
Stiv Bators was born Steven John Bator on October 22, 1949, in Youngstown, Ohio, to Mr and Mrs. Stephen John Bator Sr. He was of Pennsylvania Dutch and Slovak descent. He was in Catholic school for 12 years.

== Music and film career ==
In the course of his career Bators was involved with a variety of bands (dating back as early as 1969) beyond those for which he was best known, including Mother Goose Band (aka Mother Goose), the Steve Bator Band, Rockin’ Tomatoes, Rocket from the Tombs, Frankenstein (pre Dead Boys), Hormones, with Dennis Comeau and Andre Siva, the Whores of Babylon (with Dee Dee Ramone and Johnny Thunders). He also recorded as a solo artist with Bomp! Records.

As the lead singer and driving force of the Cleveland, Ohio–based Dead Boys, Bators helped pioneer the punk rock sound, look and attitude. The band quickly became a popular staple at CBGB, a music club in New York City's East Village. The Dead Boys were featured in the punk rock films Punking Out (1978), Live at CBGB's (1977) and Crash 'n' Burn (1977).

Following the demise of Dead Boys in 1979, Bators began a tumultuous relationship with Bomp! Records and its president, Greg Shaw. According to Shaw: "[W]hat he craved most was to escape the fetters of his Dead Boy image and win respect as a singer of contemporary pop rock (...) in other words, he wanted to be 'the thinking punk's Eric Carmen.'" To this end, and usually with first-wave punk rock veterans in tow, he recorded several singles, many of which were unreleased, and an LP, Disconnected, which was released in 1980. A retrospective album released in 1994, L.A. L.A., documented Bators' efforts as a pop-punk singer.

In 1980, Bators, relocated in London, formed the Wanderers with Dave Tregunna, the bass player for the punk group Sham 69, which had recently disbanded. The Wanderers came up with a concept album, called Only Lovers Left Alive (released in May 1981), along with two singles.

Bators and Tregunna formed the Lords of the New Church in 1981, with Brian James of the Damned. The Lords of the New Church became notorious for their live shows. Inspired by the reckless antics of Iggy Pop, Bators engaged in dangerous onstage behavior with the Dead Boys and later with the Lords of the New Church. The Lords recorded three studio albums with IRS records.

Later, the punk vocalist gained additional exposure through more mainstream film. In 1981, Bators had a small role as "Bobo" in the satirical John Waters film Polyester. In 1988, Bators made a cameo appearance as "Dick Slammer", lead singer of the fictional band the Blender Children, in the offbeat comedy Tapeheads, starring John Cusack and Tim Robbins.

In summer 1985, Bators contributed backing vocals to "Sun City" by Artists United Against Apartheid and also appeared in its music video, shot in October.

The Lords of the New Church broke up in 1989, when Bators injured his back and guitarist Brian James secretly began advertising for a replacement singer. Soon after, Stiv Bators moved to Paris, France and started to work on a new solo album. His last recording sessions were later released posthumously as the Last Race album in 1996.

Following Stiv Bators death, many musicians and bands recorded covers of his songs or dedicated works to him. His influence was highlighted in various tribute albums, including I Wanna Be a Dead Boy and Lords of the New Church: The Definitive Collection. These albums showcase how Bators' music continues to inspire new generations of musicians, keeping his legacy alive within punk rock culture.

== Death ==
On June 3, 1990, Bators was crossing the street in Paris when a taxicab hit him and knocked him down. Not believing he was seriously injured, he returned to his apartment, where he died in his sleep as the result of a traumatic brain injury at the age of 40. He was survived by his parents.

Dave Tregunna said that Bators, a fan of Jim Morrison, had earlier requested that his ashes be spread over Morrison's Paris grave and his girlfriend complied.

In the director's commentary of the film Polyester, in which Bators had a small role, director/producer John Waters stated that Bators' girlfriend, Caroline Warren, confessed to him that she snorted a portion of Stiv's ashes so that she could be closer to him.

== In film ==
In 2013, an American-made motion picture titled CBGB was released to theaters. Dead Boys were featured as one of the seminal punk bands that got their start at the CBGB club, and were first managed by Hilly Kristal. Bators is portrayed by actor Justin Bartha.

In 2019, a biographical documentary was released titled Stiv. Directed and written by Danny Garcia, the film chronicles the life, legacy and demise of Bators.

== Discography ==
=== With Dead Boys ===
Studio albums

- Young, Loud and Snotty – 1977, Sire
- We Have Come for Your Children – 1978, Sire
- Younger, Louder and Snottier – 1997, Bomp! (Alternate mix album)
- 3rd Generation Nation – 1999, Bad Boy Production (Alternate mix album)

=== With the Wanderers ===
Studio albums

- Only Lovers Left Alive – 1981, Polydor

=== With The Lords of the New Church ===
Studio albums

- The Lords of the New Church – 1982, Illegal, I.R.S.
- Is Nothing Sacred? – 1983, I.R.S.
- The Method to Our Madness – 1984, I.R.S.

=== Solo ===
Studio albums

- Disconnected – 1980, Bomp!
- The Last Race - 1996

Live albums

- Live at the Limelight – 1988, Perfect Beat (Germany, as Stiv Bators and His Evil Boys)

Compilation albums

- The Lord and the New Creatures – 1983, Lolita (France)
- I Wanna Be a Dead Boy... – 1992, Munster Records / Bomp!
- L.A. L.A. – 1993, Bomp!
- Sonic Reducer – 1994, Editions Atlas (France)
- The Last Race – 1996, Bond Age (France)
- L.A. Confidential – 2004, Bomp!
- Do You Believe In Magyk? – 2015, Easy Action (Reissue of The Last Race and Live at the Limelight)

Singles

- "It's Cold Outside" b/w "The Last Year" – 1979, Bomp!
- "Not That Way Anymore" b/w "Circumstantial Evidence" – 1980, Bomp!
- "Too Much To Dream" b/w "Make Up Your Mind" (12-inch) – 1980, Bomp!
- "Story in Your Eyes" b/w "Have Love Will Travel" – 1987, Bomp!
- "King of the Brats" b/w "Young Don't Cry" – 1995, Try To Understand (France, unofficial 7-inch – the B-side is a 1982 track by The Lords of the New Church)
- "Make Up Your Mind" b/w "Make Up Your Mind" – 2013, Ugly Pop Records (Canada, split 7-inch with David Quinton – the B-side is Quinton's 1981 solo version of the same song)

Extended Plays

- Last Stand 1980 EP – 2013, Ugly Pop Records (Canada, 7-inch, as Stiv Bators' Dead Boys – live recordings of "Son of Sam", "Third Generation Nation" and "All This and More")

Other appearances

- Various Artists: Where The Action Is!, 1980 – "Circumstantial Evidence" and "I'll Be Alright" (Promotional sampler from Bomp!)
- Artists United Against Apartheid: Sun City, 1985 – "Sun City" (Backing vocals)
- Tapeheads, 1988 – "Mr. MX7" (Stiv Bators with the Zeros; featured in the film but not included on the soundtrack album)
- Lyres: A Promise Is a Promise, 1988 – "Here's a Heart" (Guest vocals)
- Michael Monroe: Peace of Mind, 2000 – "I Wanna Be with You" and "It's a Lie" (Backing vocals; 1985 demo sessions)
