= Cheetah Chrome =

American musician (1955–2026)

- Chrome in 1977

Background information
- Born: Eugene Richard O'Connor; February 18, 1955; Cleveland, Ohio, U.S.
- Died: September 13, 2026 (aged 71) Nashville, Tennessee, U.S.
- Genres: Punk rock; garage rock
- Occupations: Musician; songwriter
- Instrument: Guitar
- Years active: 1974–2026
- Formerly of: Rocket from the Tombs; Dead Boys

Eugene Richard O'Connor (February 18, 1955 – September 13, 2026), known professionally as Cheetah Chrome, was an American musician who achieved fame as a guitarist for Rocket from the Tombs and the punk rock band Dead Boys.

== Career ==
=== Rocket From the Tombs ===
Chrome joined protopunk band Rocket from the Tombs in September 1974, having previously been in a band with member Peter Laughner. The band broke up in mid-1975, having never recorded any material.

In 2003, after the release of The Day the Earth Met the Rocket from the Tombs, he reformed Rocket from the Tombs with David Thomas, Craig Bell, with Steve Mehlman (Pere Ubu) on drums and Richard Lloyd (Television) replacing the late Peter Laughner. The reincarnation of the group toured in 2003 and 2006. In summer 2003 it entered the studio to record some of the band's old material for the first time. The recordings were released as Rocket Redux (SmogVeil). Chrome did a U.S. West coast tour in April 2004 (backed by Sweet Justice) as well as a 10 date Midwest/East coast tour as guitarist in Texas Terri's band in July. At the end of July he headlined "Festimal" in Cedeira, Spain. In September 2004, the members of RFTT flew to Germany to headline one night (the Buzzcocks headlined the other) of the International Punk Kongress in Kassel; then, in 2006, they reconvened in Cleveland to write material for a new record. This material became the single "I Sell Soul/Romeo and Juliet", released in 2010, and the full-length album Barfly, released in 2011.

He left the band again in December 2011.

=== Dead Boys ===
After the initial breakup of RFTT, Chrome, alongside other members Stiv Bators and Johnny Madansky would form a new group, Dead Boys. They took the name after the RFTT song "Down In Flames". The band released two albums before breaking up in 1980.

They had several brief reunions that Chrome was a part of, in 1987 and 2004. They reunited in 2017 to tour and promote the 40th anniversary of Young Loud and Snotty.

=== Other musical projects ===
Chrome in 2011

After Dead Boys broke up, Cheetah Chrome played around New York City (mostly at Max's Kansas City) doing shows with the Stilettos, as well as his own band Cheetah Chrome and the Casualties. He recorded a single for ORK Records, "Still Wanna Die/Take Me Home", recorded by Atlantic Records co-founder Herb Abramson. Shortly thereafter, he played on Ronnie Spector's debut solo album Siren. In 1980, he played guitar for Nico at New York's Squat Theatre as well as Max's Kansas City. He appeared on several recordings during the 1980s, most notably his own Cheetah Chrome and the Ghetto Dogs (Get Hip), Jeff Dahl's I Kill Me (Sympathy for the Record Industry), and Todd Tamanend Clark's Into the Vision (TMI). He also rejoined Dead Boys for the ill-fated reunions of the late 1980s and toured with GG Allin in 1988.

In the 1990s, Chrome moved to Nashville, Tennessee, and recorded a live album Alive in Detroit (DUI) at Lili's in Hamtramck, Michigan. In 2002, he played guitar on several tracks for False Alarm's Fuck 'Em All We've All Ready (Now) Won!. Additionally, he played with The Replacements' Bob Stinson and Testors' Sonny Vincent in the band Shotgun Rationale.

In 2007, Chrome played periodic solo shows, including headlining the Road To Ruins festival in Rome, Italy (backed by Unnatural Axe). Chrome also was chosen to advertise Gibson's new range of Les Paul BFG.

In May 2008, on the way home from the "Joey Ramone Birthday Bash", Chrome had a chance meeting at LaGuardia Airport with the members of Joan Jett's band the Blackhearts, including drummer Thommy Price, with whom he had played on Ronnie Spector's Siren. This led to several NYC area shows with the Blackhearts as his band, including a live performance on WFMU in NJ.

In the Fall of 2009, Chrome got together with old friend Sylvain Sylvain to record an EP on the suggestion of SmogVeil Records head Frank Mauceri. They recruited Thommy Price and Enzo Pennizotto from the Blackhearts as a rhythm section, naming themselves the Batusis after the dance from the hit 60s TV show "Batman". They performed two shows at SXSW 2010; Price and Penizzotto were unable to do live shows with the Batusis, due to their schedule with Joan Jett, and were replaced by Chuck Garric of Alice Cooper's band on bass, and Les Warner, formerly of The Cult, on drums. The four song ("Big Cat Stomp/What You Lack in Brains/Bury You Alive/ Blues Theme") EP was released in May 2010. A UK tour had to be cancelled due to a volcanic eruption in Iceland, but they toured the U.S.. extensively through December 2010 with Warner on drums and another former Blackheart, Sean Koos, on bass.

At the end of a week-long RFTT tour in December 2011, Chrome announced to the band that he had decided to stop touring extensively after 2012. While he planned to honor any shows they booked in 2012, they chose to get another guitar player for the upcoming European tour in May 2012.

In February 2012, Chrome became creative director of A&R/director of special projects for Plowboy Records, an alternative/legacy label being launched by Shannon Pollard, grandson of country legend Eddy Arnold, and music historian/author Don Cusic. This was officially announced on May 15, 2012. Chrome was producing a tribute record to Arnold by various artists at RCA Studio B in Nashville, as well as preparing a new full-length release by the Batusis.

=== Autobiography ===
In 2009, after repeated suggestions that he write a book from a friend who worked at Voyageur Press in Minneapolis, Minnesota, Chrome relented and submitted a sample chapter to them in spring 2009. He signed a book deal with Voyageur and began writing his autobiography. In September 2010, Cheetah Chrome: A Dead Boy's Tale from the Front Lines of Punk Rock was published.

Chrome participated in the February/ West Coast and April/ Midwest-East Coast "Cleveland Confidential Book Tour" with fellow Cleveland musicians and authors Mike Hudson of The Pagans and Bob Pfeiffer of Human Switchboard. Stops included the Experience Music Project in Seattle, the Rock and Roll Hall of Fame in Cleveland, Exile on Bowery @ Bowery Electric in NYC and the Grammy Museum at L.A. Live in Los Angeles.

=== Other related endeavors ===
In 2013, a U.S.-made motion picture titled CBGB was released. Actor Rupert Grint portrayed Chrome, while Justin Bartha portrayed Stiv Bators. Chrome himself made a cameo appearance in the film as well.

== Personal life and death ==
Chrome was born in Cleveland, Ohio, on February 18, 1955, and in his later years lived in Nashville, Tennessee, with his wife Anna O'Connor and third son.

Eugene O'Connor died in Nashville on September 13, 2026, at the age of 71. Dead Boys had planned a debut album tour to mark its 50th anniversary.
