= John Gatchell =

American jazz musician

John E. Gatchell (November 27, 1945 – July 9, 2004) was an American jazz trumpeter who was prolific in New York City recording studios from the 1970s to the mid-1980s. After serving in the U.S. Navy in the late 1960s, Gatchell became one of the founding members of the horn band Ten Wheel Drive, then Gotham. Gatchell was among the musicians hand-selected by Paul Simon, whom he considered to be the finest studio musicians for the 1981 Simon & Garfunkel Concert in Central Park

== Growing up ==
Gatchell graduated from Walt Whitman High School, South Huntington, Long Island, New York, around 1963. He had been a member of the Whitman High School Dance Band, directed by pioneer jazz educator Clem DeRosa.

== Selected discography ==
- Les Demerle, Spectrum, United Artists Records (1970) OCLC 22448851

Recorded in New York, November or December 1969

- Ten Wheel Drive, Brief Replies, Polydor (1970) OCLC 7608479

Recorded at A&R Studios, New York

- Exuma, Do Wah Nanny, Kama Sutra Records (1971)
- Esther Phillips, From A Whisper To A Scream

Recorded in New York, July to December 1971

- Joel Kaye and His New York Neophonic Orchestra, New York Neophonic, Paramount Records (1973) OCLC 16791953, 8997065, 475090535

Live at Jimmy's, New York, 1972–1988

- New York Neophonic Jazz Orchestra, New Horizons, Vol. 2, Tantara Records (1976) OCLC 62310566

Recorded in New York, 1972–1988

- Esther Phillips, Alone Again Naturally Kudu Records, OCLC 7011249

Recorded in New York, July, September & October 1972

- George Benson, Body Talk CTI Records 6033 OCLC 20898539, 721948214

Recorded in New York, July 17–18, 1973

- Ronnie Foster, On The Avenue, Blue Note Records (1974) OCLC 19116372

Recorded in New York, April 30, 1974 (BN-LA261-G), and May 1, 1974 (BN-LA261-G)

- Bill Watrous, Manhattan Wildlife Refuge, Columbia Records (1974) OCLC 3801419

Recorded in New York, May 1, 2, 3, 1974 (KG33090)

- John Tropea, Tropea, Marlin Records (1975) OCLC 18347489

Recorded in West Orange, New Jersey, 1975 (Marlin 2200)

- Bill Watrous, The Tiger of San Pedro, Columbia Records (1975) OCLC 177198349, 3801434

Recorded in New York, 1975 (Col PC33701)

- Chick Corea, The Leprechaun, Polydor (1976) OCLC 2775396

Recorded in New York, 1975 (Polydor PD6062)

- Esther Phillips, What a Diff'rence A Day Makes, Kudu Records, CTI Records

Recorded in New York, April, 1975 (Kudu KU-23; CTI 63036)

- Eumir Deodato, Very Together, MCA Records (1976) OCLC 4865043

Recorded in New Jersey, 1976 (MCA 2219)

- Blue Mitchell, Funktion Junction, RCA Records OCLC 10563364

Recorded in Hollywood, California, February 17, 1976 (RCA APL1-1493)

- Joel Kaye, Jazz in Concert, Sandcastle Records (1976) OCLC 8868010

Recorded in New York, circa July 1976 (Sandcastle LP1033)

- Lalo Schifrin, Towering Toccata, CTI Records (1977) OCLC 8872467

Recorded in Englewood Cliffs, New Jersey, October/December 1976 (CTI 7-5003)

- Grover Washington, Jr., A Secret Place, Kudu Records OCLC 6219752

Recorded in New York, October 1976 (Kudu KU-32; Motown 5165 – CD)

- Bob James, BJ 4, CTI Records (1977) OCLC 21540307

Recorded in New York, November/December 1976 (CTI 7074)

- Eumir Deodato, Love Island, Warner Bros. Records (1978) OCLC 4873725

Recorded in New York, 1977 (Warner Bros. Records BSK3132)

- Pee Wee Ellis, Home in the Country, Savoy Records (1977) OCLC 60340571

Recorded in New York, October–December 1976 & January 1977 (Savoy SJL3301)

- Art Webb, Love Eyes, Atlantic Records (1977) OCLC 24457184

Recorded in New York, May 1977 (Atlantic SD18226)

- David Matthews, Dune, CTI Records (1977) OCLC 14871738

Recorded in New York, June 1977 (CTI 7-5005)

- Idris Muhammad, Boogie To The Top, Kudu Records (1978) OCLC 8808438

Recorded in New York, December 1977 (Kudu KU38)

- Phil Upchurch, Marlin Records (1978) OCLC 26710871

Recorded in New York, 1978 (Marlin 2209, 3325)

- Michel Legrand & Company, Le Jazz Grand, Gryphon Records (1978) OCLC 13763317

Recorded in New York, March 1978 (Gryphon G786)

- Eumir Deodato, Knights Of Fantasy, Warner Bros. Records (1979) OCLC 5436103

Recorded in New York, circa 1979 (Warner Bros. Records BSK3321)

- David Chesky, Rush Hour, Columbia Records (1989) OCLC 7507792

Recorded in New York, 1980 (Columbia JC36799)

- Earl Klugh, Late Night Guitar, Liberty Records (1980) OCLC 7223982

Recorded in Los Angeles & New York, 1980 (Liberty LT1079)

- The Michael Zager Band, Let's All Chant, Private Stock Records (1978) OCLC 8104382

Recorded in New York, circa 1978s (PS7013)

- David Matthews, Grand Connection, Electric Bird Records (1983) OCLC 10771271

Recorded in New York, December 1 & 15, 1982

- Barbara Rankin, It's Been A Long, Long Time, Efvee Records (1983)

Recorded in New York, November 7–9, 1983 (EfVee 001)

- Corky Hale, Harp Beat, Stash Records (1985) OCLC 32913013

Recorded in New York, 1985 (ST245)
