= The Best of Ten Wheel Drive =

Compilation album by Ten Wheel Drive
- Released: June 20, 1995
- Recorded: 1969–1971
- Studio: Gotham Studios, New York City; A & R Studios, New York City
- Genre: Jazz rock
- Length: 78:18
- Label: Polygram
- Producer: Walter Raim, Guy Draper, Aram Schefrin, Michael Zager

Ten Wheel Drive chronology
Ten Wheel Drive (1973)	The Best of Ten Wheel Drive (1995)

The Best of Ten Wheel Drive
Review scores
Source	Rating
AllMusic	4.5/5 stars

The Best of Ten Wheel Drive is the sole compilation by Ten Wheel Drive. It was released in 1995. This marked the first occasion the included tracks appeared on CD.

== Track listing ==
All tracks are written by Aram Schefrin and Michael Zager, except where noted.

No.	Title	Writer(s)	Original album	Length
1.	"Tightrope"	Leon Rix, Genya Ravan	Construction #1
2.	"Lapidary"		Construction #1
3.	"Eye of the Needle"		Construction #1
4.	"Candy Man Blues"	Louie Hoff, Elizabeth Hoff	Construction #1
5.	"Ain't Gonna Happen"		Construction #1
6.	"House in Central Park"		Construction #1
7.	"Morning Much Better"		Brief Replies
8.	"Brief Replies"		Brief Replies
9.	"Come Live With Me"	Raven, Schefrin	Brief Replies
10.	"Stay With Me"	Jerry Ragavoy, Larry Weiss	Brief Replies
11.	"How Long Before I'm Gone"		Brief Replies
12.	"Last Of The Line"		Brief Replies
13.	"The Night I Got Out Of Jail"		Peculiar Friends
14.	"Shootin' The Breeze"		Peculiar Friends
15.	"Love Me"		Peculiar Friends
16.	"I Had Him Down"		Peculiar Friends
