= The Kinks' 1965 UK tour =

1965 concert tour by the Kinks

- Tour by the Kinks
- Promotional poster for the Portsmouth shows
- Associated album: Kinda Kinks
- Start date: 30 April 1965
- End date: 19 May 1965
- No. of shows: 33 (42 scheduled)

The Kinks concert chronology
- 1965 tour of Australasia, Hong Kong and Singapore; 1965 UK tour; 1965 US tour

The English rock band the Kinks staged their fourth concert tour of the United Kingdom in April and May 1965. The thirty-three concerts comprised the second stage of a world tour, following shows in Australasia and Asia and before stages held later that year in the United States and continental Europe. After the Kinks had served as a support act during all of their previous tours, including during the first leg of their world tour, the 1965 UK engagements were the band's first as the headline act. Supporting groups included Goldie and the Gingerbreads and the Yardbirds.

The three-week tour saw the Kinks performing two shows a day for six days a week, a gruelling schedule intended to sharpen the band's skills before their first US tour. Tensions within the group characterised much of the tour, culminating in an onstage fight in which the drummer Mick Avory struck the lead guitarist Dave Davies in the head with a hi-hat stand. Dave was hospitalised with a head injury, Avory retreated into hiding to avoid police charges and the Walker Brothers performed in the Kinks' place for the tour's final four dates. Though close to breaking up or replacing Avory with another drummer, the Kinks were convinced by their management to regroup in time for their US tour. Nationwide coverage of the band's violent disputes led British hoteliers to levy an unofficial ban against them. The ban hampered the Kinks' ability to tour the UK, which they did not do again until 1968.

== Background ==
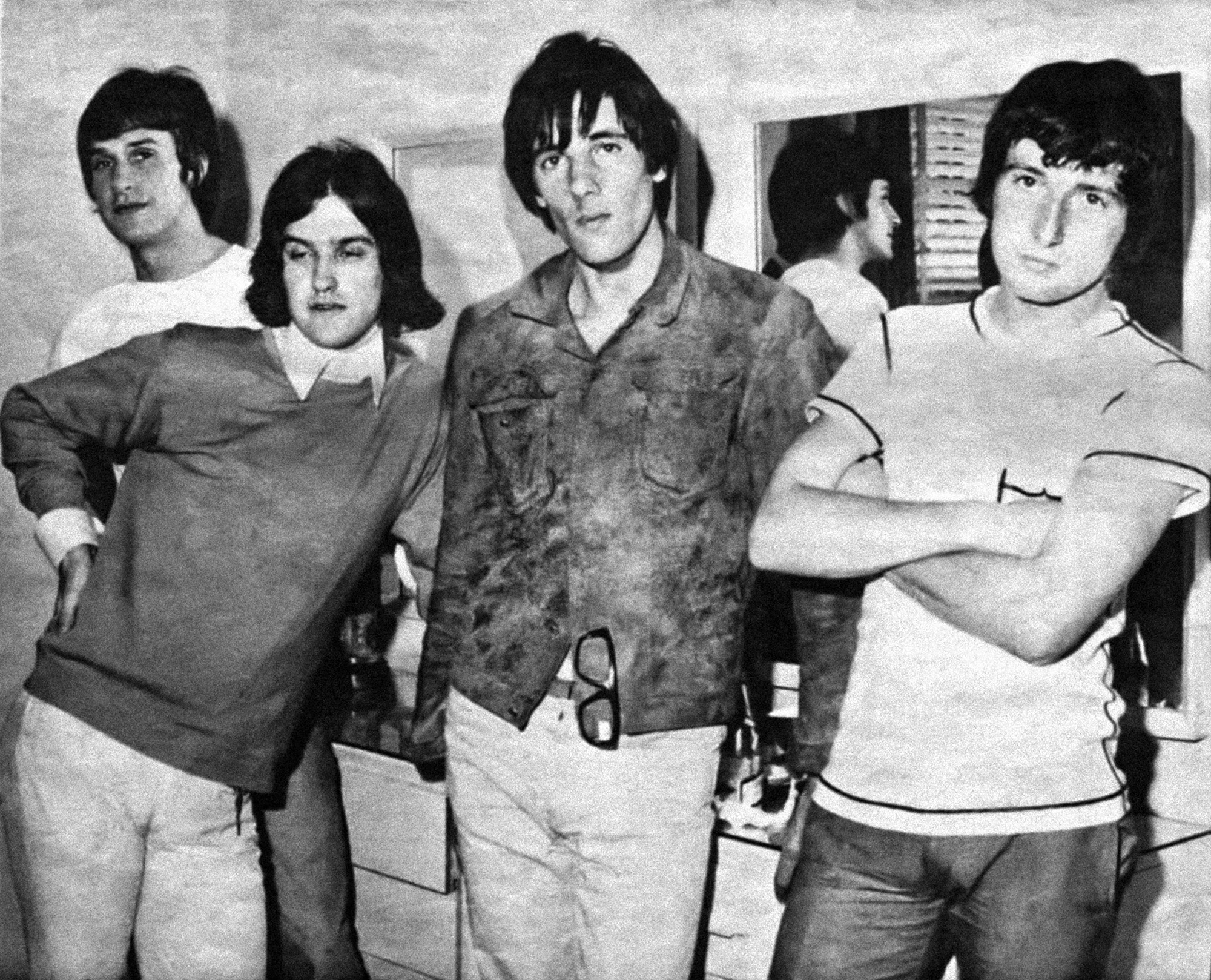
The Kinks, June 1965

The Kinks toured the United Kingdom three times in 1964, serving as a support act each time for a more popular group. (Note: The headlining acts of the 1964 tours were: The Dave Clark Five (March 29 – May 14); Billy J. Kramer (September 30, October 7–18); Gerry and the Pacemakers (November 7 – December 6)) The band had not experienced commercial success in the UK until their third single, "You Really Got Me", which reached number one on all of the major British charts in September 1964. Their success continued with their follow-up singles – "All Day and All of the Night" and "Tired of Waiting for You" – which reached number two and one on Melody Maker magazine's chart in November 1964 and February 1965, respectively. NME magazine's end-of-year readers' poll for 1964 saw the Kinks voted second in the most-popular new-group category, after the Rolling Stones. The Kinks' second album, Kinda Kinks, peaked at number three on Melody Maker's Top Ten LPs chart in April 1965.

The Kinks' management announced in March 1965 the band's intention to tour the United Kingdom. The shows formed the second leg of a world tour, following concerts in January and February in Australia, New Zealand, Hong Kong and Singapore, in which the Kinks opened for the contemporary English rock band Manfred Mann. Subsequent legs of the world tour were planned for the United States in June and July and continental Europe from September to November. The UK leg initially began in Scotland on 24 March, but the dates were cancelled only two days later after Ray Davies, the Kinks' bandleader, collapsed during a performance due to physical exhaustion, and Dave Davies, the band's lead guitarist, fell ill with bronchitis.

== Repertoire and tour personnel ==
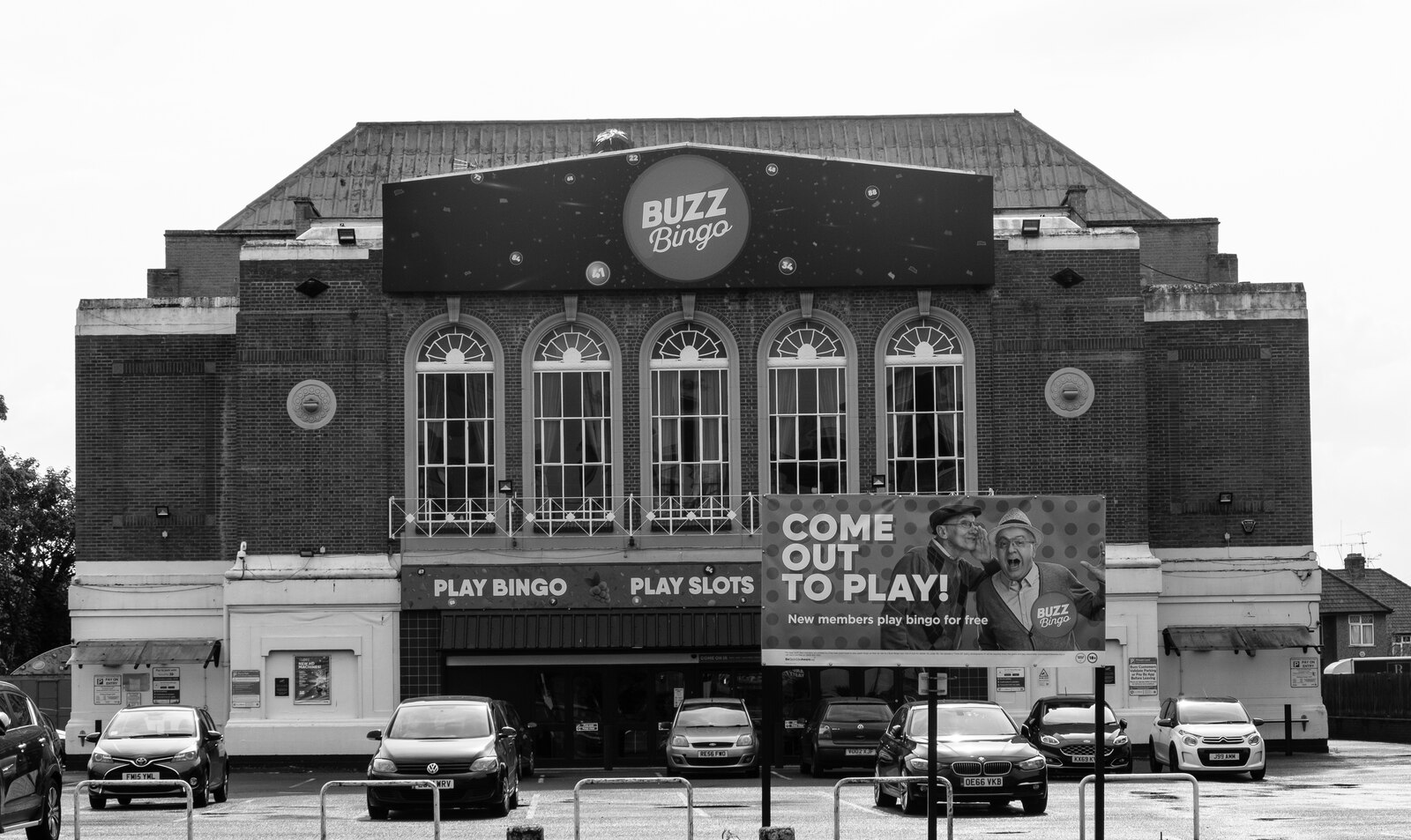
The tour's debut included a well-received performance at the Adelphi Theatre (now Buzz Bingo) in Slough.

Typically for the 1960s, the UK concerts were arranged in a package-tour format, with multiple acts on the bill and two performances held each day. The Kinks played six days a week, a gruelling schedule intended to sharpen their abilities before their first US tour a month later. On their off days, the band sometimes recorded in the studio. The Kinks' management initially planned for the tour to be with Manfred Mann, but both bands rejected the idea in March after neither was willing to accept second billing. The tour was instead the Kinks' first in which they were the featured headliners.

Including support acts, each performance lasted around two hours and was compèred by Bob Bain. The Kinks were accompanied on tour by their newly hired road manager, Sam Curtis. The support acts on the program were Mickey Finn, Jeff & Jon, the Yardbirds, the Riot Squad, Val McKenna and the American band Goldie and the Gingerbreads. One of the first all-female rock groups, the Gingerbreads drew extra press attention during the tour and performed immediately before the Kinks. (Note: After the tour, the Gingerbreads recorded several songs with the Kinks' producer, Shel Talmy, including a cover of "Look for Me Baby" from Kinda Kinks, but it went unissued.) Single appearances were made by Unit Four Plus Two, who performed on 7 May, and the Rockin' Berries, who played in place of the Yardbirds on 5 May.

The Yardbirds closed the first half of each show. Like the Kinks, the Yardbirds were part of the British rhythm and blues movement; though they were initially not as commercially successful as the Kinks, they were quickly propelled to pop-star status when their single "For Your Love" reached number one on NME's chart in April, three weeks before the tour began. Decades later, Curtis recalled Ray throwing things onto the stage during one of the Yardbirds' sets, an outburst the biographer Johnny Rogan suggests stemmed from resentment on Ray's part at the success of a musical act comparable to the Kinks. On 13 April, two weeks before the tour began, both bands independently attempted recording some of the earliest pop songs with Indian influences, a genre later termed raga rock; the Yardbirds re-recorded their song "Heart Full of Soul" on 20 April, and the Kinks returned to the studio on 3 May – their first day off from the UK tour – to re-do "See My Friends". The author Peter Lavezzoli writes that the tight timeline between the bands' pioneering recordings and their time together makes it interesting to speculate whether they discussed their work with one another during the tour. (Note: Release of "See My Friends" was delayed in the UK until 30 July, after the Kinks' US tour, but "Heart Full of Soul" was released on 4 June, thereby preempting the Kinks in introducing the Indian-influenced sound to pop music.)

The Kinks received positive reviews in the British press for the second show of the tour's debut, held on 30 April in Slough. Norman Jopling of Melody Maker characterised the band's music as powerful, adding that their energetic stage act led to an all-round entertaining show. In NME, Norrie Drummond similarly highlighted the show's theatrical elements, particularly the opening, which had the Kinks begin "You Really Got Me" on a darkened stage before a spotlight expanded to reveal the group.

== Infighting ==
=== Background and fight in Taunton ===
By early 1965, the Kinks had developed a reputation for violence and aggression, both on and off the stage. The band sometimes broke into physical altercations during rehearsals, recording sessions and concerts, with infighting common between the brothers Ray and Dave and between Dave and the drummer Mick Avory. Avory was often the target of taunting from the Davies brothers, who antagonised Avory for their own enjoyment. Pete Quaife, the band's bassist, remained on agreeable terms with all of his bandmates, and he often worked to calm situations within the group. (Note: During the tour, Quaife became sexually involved with Genya "Goldie" Zelkowitz of the Gingerbreads. Rogan suggests the relationship worsened tensions within the Kinks, since it meant Quaife was often no longer present to defuse situations.) Further exacerbating tensions between Avory and Dave, the two began sharing a rental flat in London in March 1965. Decades later, Avory reflected: "[W]orking together and living together wasn't a good idea. That's when the bust-up came, and it all fell apart."

On 18 May, following a concert in Taunton, Somerset, a major fight ensued between Avory and Dave. After returning from a post-show party, a drunk and high Dave got into separate arguments with Ray, Curtis and the hotel's night porter. Dave asked Avory to weigh-in on his argument with Ray, but Avory's refusal to engage further angered Dave. Quaife recalled that as he and Avory attempted to get away, Dave struck Avory with a suitcase. An enraged Avory began fighting Dave, violently punching him in the head and also placing him in a headlock. The fight left both with cuts and bruises, as well as a pair of black eyes for Dave. The band's management broke-up the fight, and Curtis later recalled blood running along the staircase where the fight took place.

=== Cardiff incident ===
To prevent further fighting, Curtis kept the Kinks separated before their 19 May show in Cardiff, Wales. Ray and Dave travelled in separate cars from Quaife and Avory. The pairs had different dressing rooms and did not interact until the concert began, entering from opposite ends of the stage. Dave, who wore sunglasses at the show to obscure his injuries from the previous day's fight, verbally insulted Avory during the show's opening number, "You Really Got Me". He continued insulting Avory after the song, denigrating his drumming abilities and saying it would sound better if he played "with his cock". He next kicked Avory's drum set across the stage, eliciting laughter from the audience who presumed the act was prearranged. After a few moments on his knees, Avory emerged from the wreckage, took his hi-hat stand and struck Dave over the back of the head with the cymbal end. (Note: Years later, Avory said that he flipped the hi-hat stand upside down and struck Dave with the pedal end, a version of events no witness corroborates. Ray, Quaife, Curtis, Dreja and Mitchell all subsequently specified that it was the cymbal which struck Dave.) Dave collapsed and lay motionless. Watching from the edge of the stage, Chris Dreja of the Yardbirds recalled:

[Avory] delivered what to me was like an execution – a beheading. Seriously. It was such a violent act. He hit [Dave] over the back of the head. I was absolutely stunned. I remember shaking, then thinking, "He's killed him." He just ran off stage and out of the theatre.

Worried he had unintentionally killed his bandmate, Avory fled the theatre and hid in a nearby cafe. The police were called after Dave fell unconscious, and they arrived at the theatre and the Kinks' hotel looking to question Avory. Ray later said that the incident "horrified him", and both Genya "Goldie" Zelkowitz of the Gingerbreads and Quaife recalled Ray screaming hysterically onstage. Bain announced to the crowd that the Kinks' second show had been cancelled, and the Yardbirds instead returned to perform another set. Dave was hospitalised at Cardiff Royal Infirmary, where he received 16 stitches to his head. He later said that his only memory on the incident was kicking over the drums before waking up in the theatre's dressing room covered in blood.

Can you imagine the scene? This guy wearing the hunting jacket and frilly yellow shirt running through the streets of Cardiff with hundreds of girls chasing after him because he's one of the Kinks. And he's running for his life because he thinks he's killed someone.

– Sam Curtis, the Kinks' road manager, 1982

After locating Avory, Curtis advised him to change out of his stage attire, go to Cardiff's station and board the next train, regardless of its destination. The band's management explained to officers that it was simply a stage act gone awry, but police soon considered charging Avory with grievous bodily harm. The Kinks refused journalists' requests for comment, but Curtis expressed to the press scepticism that the band would continue. In a statement to the press on the same day as the incident, Curtis said:

This looks like the end of the road for them. I think the group must break up now. I've seen this coming on for a long time. They've been all tensed up and something had to break.

=== Aftermath ===
The Kinks' four remaining dates on the tour were cancelled. Arthur Howes, the Kinks' booking agent, initially said to the press that the band's shows would continue, but by the evening of 20 May he announced that they would not be performing due to "circumstances beyond our control". The package tour continued, and the Kinks' slot was filled by the Walker Brothers, a mostly unknown American pop group whose recent single "Love Her" was then rising in the charts. After returning to London, Dave spent the next ten days recuperating at his sister's home. After initially staying at the home of the journalist Keith Altham in New Malden, Surrey, Avory quietly retreated to his mother's home in East Molesey. Britain's national press covered the situation, which some dubbed "the Kinks Kontroversy". (Note: The Kinks adopted the designation as the title of their next album, released that November.)

Everything was a bit upside down. Nobody really knew what was happening. Had we split up? Had we decided to go our own different ways? For about a week it was total confusion. I personally had no contact with anyone. I just stayed at home and counted my losses.

– Pete Quaife, 2005

Like Curtis, Larry Page, the Kinks' personal manager, expected that the incident would lead to a break-up of the Kinks. The band briefly considered replacing Avory with another drummer; by 24 May, Mitch Mitchell of the Riot Squad had agreed in principle to joining the group. Motivated to keep the band together for their first US tour, Page sought to reconcile Dave and Avory and avoid the likelihood of police involvement. Page convinced Dave to not press charges, and he instructed Avory to downplay the incident in press interviews, instead attributing Dave's injuries to an accident and denying that there were any tensions within the band. (Note: In one statement, Avory suggested he was supposed to pretend to strike Dave as part of the band's new stage act but then accidentally did so. In an interview with Disc Weekly magazine, he instead said that the cymbal was accidentally knocked over onto Dave. Ray described it as a "prank" which had gone awry.) Despite the unconvincing and sometimes contradictory stories espoused by Avory, the press expressed no skepticism, but instead criticised the group for not continuing the tour with a substitute guitarist, an option dismissed by both Dave and Curtis. In interviews, Ray apologised for his brother's behaviour, something he attributed to Dave only being a teenager when the Kinks experienced sudden success.

Determined to reconcile the band, Page phoned each Kink individually and invited them to the London offices of his firm, Denmark Productions. Expecting to see Page alone, the members arrived on 28 May for the group meeting. To prevent the band from asking questions, Page spoke for most of the meeting about plans for their US tour, which was set to begin on 9 June. Page later recalled: "At the end of it, I just said, 'Any questions?' And Mick Avory said he needed new cymbals because he'd smashed them over Dave's head." The band agreed to regroup and fulfill their upcoming commitments, but the tour was delayed a week until the 17th, something necessitated by Dave's head injury.

To downplay the public perception of his injuries, Dave appeared at the Variety Club Star Gala at Battersea Park, south London, on 29 May, signing autographs for charity. The band held numerous interviews with the press in the first two weeks of June to defend against negative publicity while they would be away in the US. In addition, Page organised a photo session of the band which depicted them holding an 18-inch cymbal, supposedly the one which struck Dave, but actually much larger than the hi-hat cymbal used. The band performed one concert and made four British television appearances in the first week of June, before departing to the US on the 17th.

Tensions among the Kinks persisted through the US tour. After the incident in Cardiff, Dave and Avory had generally stopped speaking to one another, and Avory never again returned to their shared flat. Page later recalled needing to keep the group separated on their tour bus to prevent additional fighting. He added that Quaife was generally a calming influence among his bandmates, but he remained hesitant to take sides in the most recent dispute. After reading coverage of the Cardiff incident, many British hoteliers, wary of the Kinks' antics, enacted an unofficial ban against them. Curtis recalled: "Word went out. The minute I went in to book them – 'No way'. Who wants blood all over their carpets or equipment torn off the wall?" The blacklisting hampered the Kinks' ability to tour Britain, as they were forced to drive home to London after each show. Besides one-off shows around the country, the Kinks did not tour the UK again until April 1968. (Note: Tensions between Avory and Dave persisted throughout the Kinks' history; during a 1984 US tour, the two nearly broke into another physical fight. After Ray found the situation untenable, Avory agreed to leave the band later that year.)

== Set list ==
Only one set list from the tour is known to the band biographer Doug Hinman:

30 April 1965, Adelphi Cinema, Slough (second show)

1. "You Really Got Me"
2. "Beautiful Delilah"
3. "It's Alright"
4. "Tired of Waiting for You"
5. "Ev'rybody's Gonna Be Happy"
6. "It's All Over Now"
7. "All Day and All of the Night"
8. "Hide and Seek"

== Tour dates ==
According to Doug Hinman:

List of tour dates with date, city, country and venue
Date (1965)	City	Country	Venue
30 April (2 shows)	Slough	England	Adelphi Cinema
1 May (2 shows)	Walthamstow	England	Granada Cinema
2 May (2 shows)	Lewisham	England	Odeon Cinema
4 May (2 shows)	Portsmouth	England	Portsmouth Guildhall
5 May (2 shows)	Aldershot	England	ABC Cinema
6 May (2 shows)	Kingston upon Thames	England	Granada Cinema
7 May (2 shows)	East Ham	England	Granada Cinema
8 May (2 shows)	Hanley	England	Gaumont Cinema
9 May (2 shows)	Coventry	England	Coventry Theatre
11 May (2 shows)	Swindon	England	Odeon Cinema
12 May (2 shows)	Southend-on-Sea	England	Odeon Cinema
13 May (2 shows)	Bedford	England	Granada Cinema
14 May (2 shows)	Tooting	England	Granada Cinema
15 May (2 shows)	Bournemouth	England	Bournemouth Winter Gardens
16 May (2 shows)	Ipswich	England	Gaumont Cinema
18 May (2 shows)	Taunton	England	Gaumont Cinema
19 May (2 shows; second show cancelled)	Cardiff	Wales	Capitol Theatre
~~20 May~~ (2 shows; cancelled)	Wolverhampton	England	Gaumont Cinema
~~21 May~~ (2 shows; cancelled)	Bolton	England	Odeon Cinema
~~22 May~~ (2 shows; cancelled)	Leeds	England	Odeon Cinema
~~23 May~~ (2 shows; cancelled)	Derby	England	Gaumont Cinema

== Sources ==
- Davies, Dave (1996). Kink: An Autobiography. New York City: Hyperion. ISBN 978-0-7868-6149-1 – via the Internet Archive.
- Feldman-Barrett, Christine (2022). A Women's History of the Beatles. New York City: Bloomsbury Academic. ISBN 978-1-5013-4805-1 – via Google Books.
- Fleiner, Carey (2017). The Kinks: A Thoroughly English Phenomenon. Lanham, Maryland: Rowman & Littlefield. ISBN 978-1-4422-3542-7 – via Google Books.
- Hasted, Nick (2011). The Story of the Kinks: You Really Got Me. London: Omnibus Press. ISBN 978-1-84938-660-9 – via the Internet Archive.
- Hinman, Doug (2004). The Kinks: All Day and All of the Night: Day-by-Day Concerts, Recordings, and Broadcasts, 1961–1996. San Francisco, California: Backbeat Books. ISBN 978-0-87930-765-3.
- Jovanovic, Rob (2013). God Save the Kinks: A Biography. London: Aurum Press. ISBN 978-1-84513-671-0 – via the Internet Archive.
- Kitts, Thomas M. (2008). Ray Davies: Not Like Everybody Else. New York City: Routledge. ISBN 978-0-415-97768-5 – via the Internet Archive.
- Lavezzoli, Peter (2006). The Dawn of Indian Music in the West. New York City: Continuum. ISBN 978-0-8264-1815-9 – via the Internet Archive.
- Power, Martin (2014). Hot Wired Guitar: The Life of Jeff Beck. London: Omnibus Press. ISBN 978-1-78305-592-0.
- Ravan, Genya (2004). Lollipop Lounge: Memoirs of a Rock and Roll Refugee. New York City: Billboard Books. ISBN 978-0-8230-8362-6 – via the Internet Archive.
- Rogan, Johnny (1984). The Kinks: The Sound and the Fury. London: Elm Tree Books. ISBN 0-241-11308-3.
- Rogan, Johnny (2015). Ray Davies: A Complicated Life. London: The Bodley Head. ISBN 978-1-84792-317-2 – via the Internet Archive.
- Russo, Greg (2002). Yardbirds: The Ultimate Rave-Up (Fourth ed.). Floral Park, New York: Crossfire Publications. ISBN 978-0-9648157-8-0.
- Savage, Jon (1984). The Kinks: The Official Biography. London: Faber and Faber Limited. ISBN 978-0-571-13407-6 – via the Internet Archive.
- Savage, Jon (2015). 1966: The Year the Decade Exploded. London: Faber & Faber. ISBN 978-0-571-27762-9 – via the Internet Archive.
- Schaffner, Nicholas (1982). The British Invasion: From the First Wave to the New Wave. New York City: McGraw Hill. ISBN 978-0-07-055089-6 – via Google Books.
