= Isis (horn-rock band) =

American all-female rock band

- Origin: New York, U.S.
- Genre: Rock
- Years active: 1972–1980
- Labels: Buddah Records; United Artists Records
- Spinoff of: Goldie & the Gingerbreads
- Past members: Carol MacDonald; Ginger Bianco; Suzi Ghezzi; Stella Bass; Nydia "Liberty" Mata; Lauren Draper; Lolly Bienenfeld; Jeanie Fineberg; Margo Lewis; Faith Fusillo; Vivian Stoll; Ellen Seeling; Barbara Cobb; Laurie Frink; Lynx Quicksilver

Isis was an all-female rock band formed in New York in 1972. The band was founded by Carol MacDonald and Ginger Bianco following the break-up of their former group Goldie & the Gingerbreads. They took their name from the Egyptian goddess Isis, and were an early example of professional women in rock music in the 1970s, becoming the fifth all-female band to be signed to a major label.

== Biography ==
=== The first two albums ===
Isis was formed in 1972 by Carol MacDonald (vocals/guitar) and Ginger Bianco (née Panabianco; drums), former members of 1960s female rock band Goldie & The Gingerbreads. To fill out the line-up, they recruited Susan Ghezzi (guitar), Stella Bass (vocals/bass), Nydia 'Liberty' Mata (percussion) and a horn section featuring Jeanie Fineberg (sax/vocals), Lauren Draper (trumpet/vocals) and Lolly Bienenfeld (trombone/vocals).

Isis built a solid following on the New York club circuit, and in 1973 became the fifth all-female band to sign to a major label, signing to Buddah Records. In the fall of 1974, they released their self-titled debut album. The Isis album was produced by George "Shadow" Morton and drew comparisons to Chicago, Blood, Sweat & Tears, Earth Wind & Fire, and Santana, as well as Black Sabbath, Yes and Jethro Tull. The album cover—a photograph of the band members in nothing but metallic body paint—created a sensation, and the LP reached Billboard's Top 100 chart.

Despite receiving positive reviews for the album and live appearances, Isis failed to reach mainstream audiences. One possibility for the resistance encountered by the band may have been singer Carol MacDonald's unwillingness to deny her homosexuality, which she sang about in the song "She Loves Me".

As time went on, the group scored support slots with the biggest acts of the day, including Kiss, Aerosmith, The Beach Boys, and Lynyrd Skynyrd, among others. In 1974, Susan Ghezzi (guitar) was replaced by Renata Ferrer and Lauren Draper was replaced by Ellen Seeling. The band also added Edith Dankowitz (sax/vocals) and former Gingerbreads organist Margo Lewis (B-3).

In 1975, this incarnation of Isis recorded the group's follow-up album, Ain't No Backin' Up Now, with producer/songwriter Allen Toussaint at his studio in New Orleans. (Toussaint had just completed recording "Lady Marmalade" with LaBelle.) Ain't No Backin' Up Now relies on soul, funk, and disco influences and featured a guest appearance by guitarist June Millington, fresh from the break-up of Fanny. Reviewing it in Christgau's Record Guide: Rock Albums of the Seventies (1981), Robert Christgau wrote:

On their Shadow Morton-produced debut this brassy ten-woman ensemble sounded like a cross between Vanilla Fudge and the Mount St. Mary's College Lab Band, but here Allen Toussaint's horn arrangements cut a channel for their melodrama. As is usual on Toussaint albums, the side that features his songs is a lot stronger than the side that features the band's. Now if only he could describe lesbian life as knowledgeably as Carol MacDonald in 'Bobbie and Maria' or Jeanie Fineberger in 'Eat the Root.' But that would be a lot to ask.

=== Breaking Through and break-up ===
Without commercial success, it was difficult to keep the group together. Equally challenging was finding qualified female musicians to join the band. By 1976, the core line up was Carol MacDonald, Margo Lewis, Jeanie Feinberg, Ellen Seeling and new members Faith Fusillo (vocals/guitar), Barbara Cobb (bass), Vivian Stoll (drums) and Lynx (sax/guitar/vocals).

In 1977, the band signed with its second label, United Artists, and released their third album, Breaking Through, produced by Len Barry. Frustrated by the inability to turn great reviews into commercial success, the LP was a departure from its two previous releases and was geared specifically to the commercial market. However, this LP, like the others, was once again a commercial disappointment. Alumni members Nydia Mata, Ellen Seeling, Lolly Bienenfeld, Lauren Draper and Jeanie Fineberg, as well as newcomer Laurie Frink, also appeared on the album.

The band (with Frink and other guest members) toured to support the release of the LP throughout the US and the Caribbean. The group opened for chart-topping BT Express and Dr. Buzzard's Savannah Band on the west coast leg, and for Blondie on the east coast dates.

After the touring to support Breaking Through, the group took up residence for a time at Greenwich Village landmark Trude Heller's on 6th Avenue and 9th Street, where they played nightly. However, the continued lack of commercial success eventually led the group to disband by the end of the 1970s.

=== Solo projects ===
The majority of the ex-Isis members are still working in the music field, and are often involved in a variety of projects.

- Nydia Mata, already a full-time member of Laura Nyro's band before Isis, played with Ginger Bianco, Jeanie Fineberg and Ellen Seeling in the salsa band Latin Fever. In March 1981 (Women's History Month) she formed the Afro-Cuban group Retumba.
- Jeanie Fineberg and Ellen Seeling formed the jazz band Deuce. Mata and MacDonald joined them for Deuce's self-titled, debut release in 1986. In 1989, Fineberg and Seeling moved to California, where they lead the Montclair Women's Big Band, which has performed at the Kennedy Center in Washington D.C, the Grammys, and the Monterey Jazz Festival.
- Stella Bass moved to Atlanta, Georgia; she formed her own band (with male and female musicians) called The Stella Bass Band and released a 2007 gospel album. The Stella Bass Band did a soundtrack for the movie Hall Pass, directed by Peter Farrelly and Bobby Farrelly, and is also featured in the film.
- Laurie Frink was one of NYC's most sought-after session players and brass teachers until her death in 2013, having recorded and toured with numerous artists including Gerry Mulligan and Laurie Anderson.
- Margo Lewis opened a talent agency, Talent Consultants International, Ltd., in NYC in 1983. Through the years, its clients have included Bo Diddley, Wilson Pickett, Asia, The Zombies, Carl Palmer and Belinda Carlisle, among others.
- Faith Fusillo joined Lewis in 1983 and became business manager to Bo Diddley in 1992. Since his passing on June 2, 2008, Lewis and Fusillo manage the Estate of Bo Diddley through their company, Talent Source.

=== Isis 2001 ===
On November 13, 1997 Margo Lewis, Ginger Bianco and Genya Ravan participated in a one-off Goldie & the Gingerbreads reunion. This took place thirty years after the initial break-up of that group, and 22 years after their last performance together as members of Isis.

Eventually MacDonald and Bianco formed a new version of Isis with Lolly Bienenfeld (now playing with Jazz Diva) as the third core member. The new members were Denny Colt (guitar), Bonnie Parker (bass), Pam Fleming (trumpet), Laura Dryer (sax) and Paula Jeanine (percussion). This line-up debuted on January 26, 2001, at the New York Bottom Line headlining a female musicians' night. Plans for a new album, however, never materialised.

The original members and their replacements later gathered at a Women in Music jam; it turned out to be the final chapter in the band's history, as health reasons soon forced lead singer (and the band's sole constant member) Carol MacDonald to quit. MacDonald died on March 12, 2007. Six months later, on September 20, Ginger Bianco was given the Women Breaking Barriers Award by the GLBT Historical Society, partly for her work in Isis. Lynx Quicksilver, whose real name was Mary Lynn Sheffield, born June 8, 1943, in Great Britain, died peacefully on February 20, 2014, in Huntsville, Alabama.

Stella Bass was listed by online magazine She Shreds in a list of 100 black women guitarists and bassists. She died in 2023.

== Discography ==
- Isis (1974), Buddah Records
- Ain't No Backin' Up Now (1975), Buddah Records
- Breaking Through (1977), United Artists
