= Goldie and the Gingerbreads =

American all-female rock band

Goldie & the Gingerbreads
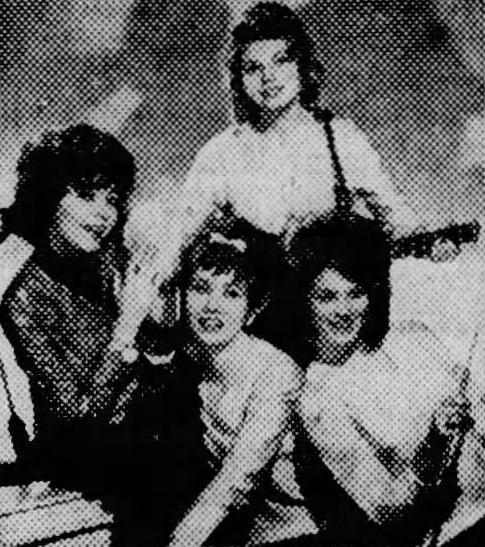
- Goldie & the Gingerbreads in 1963

Background information
- Origin: New York City, U.S.
- Genres: Rock
- Years active: 1962–1968; 1997
- Labels: Atlantic; Decca
- Past members: Genya Ravan; Ginger Bianco; Margo Lewis; Carol MacDonald

Goldie & the Gingerbreads was an all-female American rock band formed in New York in 1962. The quartet, primarily consisting of vocalist Genya "Goldie" Zelkowitz (later Genya Ravan), drummer Ginger Bianco, organist/keyboardist Margo Lewis and guitarist/vocalist Carol MacDonald, are considered one of the first all-female rock bands and were the first to be signed to a major record label. They were signed to Decca in 1963 and Atlantic in 1964. The band released several singles during the 1960s until their break-up in 1968, while their only album, the compilation Thinking About the Good Times: Complete Recordings 1964–1966, was released in 2021.

== History ==
=== Formation and early days (1962–1963) ===
In 1962, local musician Genya Zelkowitz (later known as Genya Ravan) was introduced to drummer Ginger Bianco (née Panabianco), in the New York City club where Zelkowitz was the lead singer of Richard Perry's band The Escorts. Panabianco was on stage, drumming for a friend of Perry's. This acquaintance with a female drummer inspired in Genya the idea of an all-female rock and roll band. The name of the would-be band was quickly decided on: Goldie was the name given to Genya by her mother after their arrival in the United States from post-war Poland, whilst gingerbread was a play on Ginger's name.

Richard Perry and the other members of the Escorts were college students. When the summer concert season ended, Genya and Ginger began to look for a pianist and soon recruited Carol O'Grady. Finding a female guitarist turned out to be much harder. Various ad-hoc recruits filled in as and when required, but when they accompanied Chubby Checker on his 1962 concert tour of West Germany and Switzerland, they performed without a guitarist. Organist Margo Lewis, who turned out to be the group's third permanent member, replaced O'Grady and performed with the group on the Chubby Checker tour. The following year, Goldie and the Gingerbreads were signed to Decca and recruited guitarist and vocalist Carol MacDonald, who at the time was signed to Atlantic/Atco Records, as their fourth permanent band member.

=== Signing to Atlantic Records and European tour (1964–1965) ===
In 1964, the group released their first single, "Skinny Vinnie", through Spokane Records. Although credited to Zelkowitz and Stan Green, the song was the Bill Haley composition "Skinny Minnie" with slight lyric changes. That same year, fashion photographer and director Jerry Schatzberg threw a party for the Warhol superstar Baby Jane Holzer that was later referred to by writer Tom Wolfe as "the Mods and Rockers ball, the party of the year." Goldie and the Gingerbreads were booked to provide the musical entertainment and impressed the assembled attendees with both their music and their inimitable presence. Among the guests at the event were the Rolling Stones and Ahmet Ertegün, the chairman of Atlantic Records, who promptly signed them to the label.

Later that year, the band met Eric Burdon and the Animals, whose manager contracted the Gingerbreads for a 1965 tour in England. A standard group tour arranged by record companies to showcase their roster of talent, the Gingerbreads were one of up to six bands on the tour. In Britain, they toured with the Rolling Stones, the Animals, the Beatles, the Yardbirds, the Hollies and the Kinks, among others. After supporting the Kinks on their 1965 UK tour, the Gingerbreads recorded several songs with the Kinks' producer Shel Talmy, including a cover of "Look for Me Baby", though it went unissued.

Troubles with British working visa requirements led to the band performing dates in West Germany (where many UK and US troops were then stationed as part of the NATO defences) at venues including the Star-Club in Hamburg while they waited for their British work permits to come through. A subsequent appearance in Paris at the Olympia earned Goldie & the Gingerbreads a favourable introduction to the French music scene, despite technical difficulties that arose during the performance.

Goldie and the Gingerbread's single "Can't You Hear My Heartbeat" reached No. 25 on the UK Singles Chart in 1965. Although it was also released in the United States, a recording of the same song by the heavily promoted Herman's Hermits was released nationwide with great fanfare just two weeks prior to the Gingerbreads' version, thus fatally undermining the Gingerbreads' chances for their first hit single in the U.S.

=== Final releases and break-up (1966–1968) ===
In 1966, the band released the singles "Think About the Good Times" and "Sailor Boy", while their final single, "Walking in Different Circles", was released the following year. Over the course of 1967 and 1968, the group began to fragment as various members joined and departed. A return to the United States in a final attempt to garner mainstream success there failed, and the band broke up in 1968. Vocalist Genya's strong personality and selfish leadership has been cited as the major factor in the band's split, although frustration due to making little profit from their releases may also have been a significant issue.

=== Reunion and recognition (1997–present) ===
On November 13, 1997, the Gingerbreads reunited for a performance to mark their 30th anniversary and to commemorate the release of The Rolling Stone Book of Women in Rock. Accompanying Ginger, Margo and Genya was Debby Hastings on bass and Diane Scanlon on guitar. On February 3, 1998, Goldie and the Gingerbreads were presented with a Touchstone Award from NY based Women in Music. The distinction is given to women who "have the courage and inspiration to make a difference in the music industry and whose work has set new standards.". At the awards ceremony, the statuettes were presented to each member of the group by Ahmet Ertegun, who signed the band to Atlantic in 1964.

In 2011, Goldie and the Gingerbreads were recognized by the Rock and Roll Hall Of Fame as part of its "Women Who Rock: Vision, Passion, Power" exhibit. In 2021, the band's first collection of their work, the compilation album Thinking About the Good Times: Complete Recordings 1964–1966, was released by British label Ace.

== Other projects ==
Following the band's break-up, Genya Ravan went on to form Ten Wheel Drive, while Carol MacDonald and Ginger Bianco later formed the nucleus of jazz-fusion band Isis. Ravan would also go on to have a career in record production and radio, notably producing the Dead Boys 1977 debut album Young Loud and Snotty. She now hosts two radio shows on Little Steven's Underground Garage channel on SiriusXM: Goldie's Garage and Chicks and Broads. Ravan's memoirs, titled Lollipop Lounge: Memoirs of a Rock and Roll Refugee, were published in 2004 by Billboard Books.

In the early 1980s, Margo Lewis founded Talent Consultants International, Ltd., a talent booking agency in New York, and later became a partner in Talent Source, Ltd. She was Bo Diddley's agent since the 1980s and his manager since 1992, until his death in 2008. Lewis also toured with Diddley as his keyboardist for the last 10 years of his life.

== Members ==
Although several other musicians played with Goldie & the Gingerbreads over the years, permanent members were:

- Genya Ravan – vocals, tambourine, saxophone (1962–1967)
- Ginger Bianco – drums, percussion (1962–1967)
- Margo Lewis – B3 organ, keyboards (1962–1967)
- Carol MacDonald – guitar, background vocals (1963–1967; died 2007)

== Discography ==
=== Compilations ===
- Thinking About the Good Times: Complete Recordings 1964–1966 (2021; Ace)

=== Singles ===
Year	Title	Peak chart positions
Year	Title	UK
1964	"Skinny Vinnie" b/w "Chew Chew Fee Fi Fum": Label: Spokane	—
1965	"That's Why I Love You" b/w "What Kind of Man Are You": Label: Decca	—
1965	"Can't You Hear My Heartbeat" b/w "Little Boy": Label: Decca	25
1965	"That's Why I Love You" (Note: Single released only in the U.K.) b/w "The Skip": Label: Decca	—
1966	"Think About the Good Times" b/w "Please Please": Label: ATCO	—
1966	"Sailor Boy" b/w "Please Please": Label: Decca	—
1967	"Walking in Different Circles" b/w "Song of the Moon": Label: ATCO	—
"—" denotes releases that did not chart or were not released in that territory.
