= Ten Wheel Drive =

American rock band

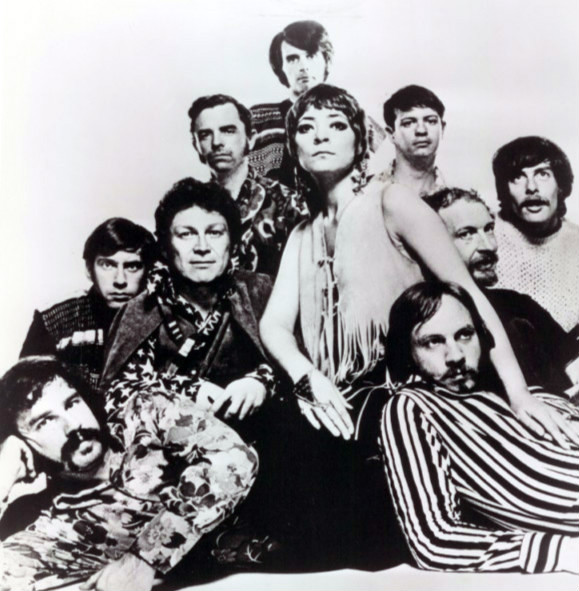
- The group in 1970

Background information
- Origin: United States
- Genres: Jazz rock
- Years active: 1968–1974
- Past members: Genya Ravan; Aram Schefrin; Michael Zager

Ten Wheel Drive was an American rock band which existed from 1968 to 1974.

== History ==
In 1968, after the break-up of the all-female rock band Goldie and the Gingerbreads, Genya Ravan was looking for a new band, as were two New Jersey musicians and songwriters, Michael Zager and Aram Schefrin. Acquainted by their managers, the three musicians would become the nucleus of the new band.

More musicians had to be found for the rhythm and brass sections. With the exception of Ravan, only people who were able to read sheet music were hired. In 1969, the band started to perform regularly and attract positive reviews.

At the same time, Polydor Records was forming an American division. Its new president, Jerry Schoenbaum, closed a deal with Ten Wheel Drive, and together with producer Walter Raim the band released its first album, Construction #1.

Ten Wheel Drive's first big concert appearance was in 1969 at the Fillmore East in New York City. Apart from the band's intense musical presence, Ravan caused some excitement when she took off her see-through jacket and continued the performance half-naked with painted breasts and shoulders.

In the summer of the same year, Ten Wheel Drive appeared at the Atlanta Pop Festival. On this occasion Ravan met Janis Joplin (to whom she had often been previously compared), for the second time, after first meeting at Steve Paul's The Scene, when Joplin sat in with the band.

In 1970, Ten Wheel Drive released their second album, Brief Replies, with producer Guy Draper. By then many of the brass musicians had also been replaced. Reviewing in Christgau's Record Guide: Rock Albums of the Seventies (1981), Robert Christgau wrote: "This beats Lighthouse (arrghh) and Blood, Sweat & Tears (urrp), but with their intricate charts and printed music Michael Zager and Aram Schefrin make like they paid their dues in a conservatory. Which I'm sure they did. The intensity of Janis surrogate Ravan is a little less harsh and wearying on the follow-up, though. And it all comes together on 'Morning Much Better,' about when rather than how to make love."

1971 saw Ten Wheel Drive performing at Carnegie Hall. The project consisted of a rock opera based on the Battle of the Little Big Horn and the history of the Native North American peoples. The American Symphony Orchestra and a choir participated in the project.

Also in 1971, the band's third album, Peculiar Friends, appeared, for the first time produced by Schefrin and Zager. Ravan left the band and started her solo career at this time. She was replaced by Annie Sutton of the Rascals. Schefrin and Zager later contributed to Ravan's first solo album.

Ten Wheel Drive left Polydor, and their fourth and final album, Ten Wheel Drive (1974), was released by Capitol Records. The album includes one song that had been composed earlier by Ravan with Schefrin and Zager, "Why Am I So Easy to Leave". With this record the already loose cooperation between the band's musicians ended. Michael Zager had a big disco hit, "Let's all Chant", in 1978.

== Line-up ==
Founding members
vocals, harmonica, tambourine	Genya Ravan
guitar, vocals, banjo, percussion	Aram Schefrin
organ, piano, clarinet	Michael Zager
Various musicians on other instruments
bass	Bill Takas, Bob Piazza, Blake Hines
drums, percussion	Luther Rix, Allen Herman, David Williams
cello	Luther Rix
flute	Jay Silva, Louie Hoff, Dave Liebman
trumpet	Jay Silva, Richard Meisterman, Peter Hyde, Steve Satten, John Gatchell, John Eckert, Dean Pratt, Danny Stiles Francisco, Frank Frint, Dick Green
saxophone	Louie Hoff, Dave Liebman
trombone	Dennis Parisi, Bill Watrous, Tom Malone
flugelhorn	Jay Silva, Peter Hyde, Richard Meisterman, Steve Satten, John Gatchell, John Eckert
woodwinds	Alan Gauvin
Last line-up
vocals	Annie Sutton
organ, clarinet, keyboards, vibraphone	Michael Zager
guitar, vocals	Aram Schefrin
piano, keyboards	Don Grolnick
trombone	Gerry Chamberlain
drums, percussion	Barry Lazarowitz
bass, violin	Harry Max, Bill Abrams
trumpet, flugelhorn, horn	Dean Pratt, John Gatchell, Dick Green
woodwinds	Ed Xiques
choir	Daryl Hall, John Oates, Tom Cosgrove, Joey Ward

== Discography ==
=== Albums ===
Year	Title	US	Label
1969	Construction #1	151	Polydor
1970	Brief Replies	161	Polydor
1971	Peculiar Friends	190	Polydor
1973	Ten Wheel Drive	—	Capitol

=== Compilations ===
- 1995 The Best of Ten Wheel Drive

=== Singles ===
Year	A-side	B-side	US	Label	Cat No.
1969	"Tightrope"	"Lapidary"	—	Polydor	PD 2-14015
1969	"Eye of the Needle"	"I Am a Want Ad"	—	Polydor	2066 015
1970	"Morning Much Better"	"Stay with Me"	74	Polydor	PD 2-14037
1970	"Down in the Cold"	"Last of the Line"	—	Polydor	PD 2-14052
1971	"No Next Time"	"The Night I Got Out of Jail"	—	Polydor	2066 122
1973	"Monsoon Rain"	"Close Up the Cheese"	—	Capitol	P-3700
"—" denotes releases that did not chart.
