= The Tiger of San Pedro =

"The Tiger of San Pedro" is a jazz song by John LaBarbera, made popular by trombonist Bill Watrous. It was the title song of the Grammy-nominated Columbia recording "Tiger of San Pedro" by Watrous' band, The Manhattan Wildlife Refuge.

The title is based on a character in one of the 56 short stories featuring Sherlock Holmes. Don Juan Murillo is a deposed dictator from Central America, formerly known as "The Tiger of San Pedro", living in England, in the story "The Adventure of Wisteria Lodge".
