= Genya Ravan =

American rock singer and producer (born 1940)

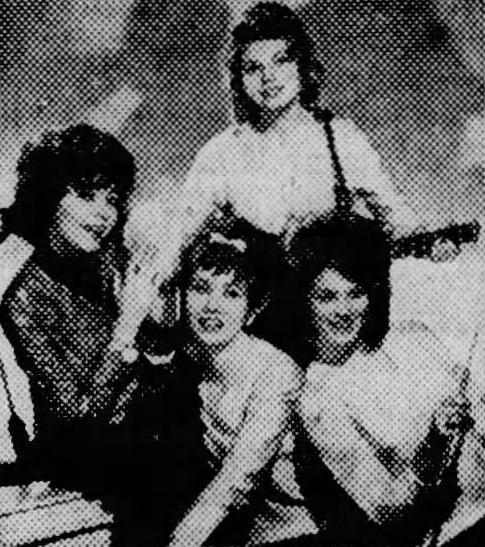
- Goldie and the Gingerbreads in 1963

Background information
- Also known as: Goldie
- Born: Genyusha Zelkowitz; April 19, 1940 (age 86); Łódź, Poland
- Genres: Rock
- Occupations: Musician; record producer; radio host
- Instruments: Vocals; tambourine; saxophone; harmonica
- Years active: 1962–present
- Formerly of: Goldie & the Gingerbreads; Ten Wheel Drive; Escort

Genya Ravan (born Genyusha Zelkowitz; April 19, 1940), also known as Goldie, is an American rock singer and music producer. She was lead singer of the Escorts, Goldie and the Gingerbreads, and Ten Wheel Drive.

== Early life ==
Genyusha Zelkovicz was born in Łódź, Poland in a Jewish family in 1940 and emigrated to the United States in 1947, accompanied by her parents and one sister. They were her only family members who had survived the Nazi Holocaust in Europe. Two brothers, grandparents, and multiple aunts and uncles died in concentration camps. The family did not speak any English when they arrived. Genya was named 'Goldie' by her mother, who claimed Genyusha was not American enough.

== Career ==
=== Early success and Goldie and the Gingerbreads ===
Goldie's career started in 1962 in a Brooklyn club called The Lollipop Lounge, which is also the title of her autobiography published by Billboard Books. On a dare, she jumped up to sing, which she states was the first time she had heard her voice. She was asked to join the band the Escorts, which featured Richard Perry as one of the members. After signing to Decca's subsidiary Coral Records and being produced by Henry Jerome, she found success with a cover of "Somewhere" from West Side Story, which went to number one in parts of the Midwest.

In 1963, she formed Goldie and the Gingerbreads after meeting drummer Ginger Bianco in a Greenwich Village bar. After seeing the band at a party for the Rolling Stones, Atlantic Records Chairman Ahmet Ertegün signed them to Atlantic subsidiary Atco Records.

While playing at New York City's hot spot The Wagon Wheel on 45th Street in Times Square, Mike Jeffries, Eric Burdon, Hilton Valentine, and Chas Chandler spotted them and wanted them to come to England. Goldie and the Gingerbreads toured with the Rolling Stones, the Yardbirds, the Kinks, the Hollies and Manfred Mann. They released their hit song "Can't You Hear My Heart Beat" in 1965, which reached number 25 on the UK Singles Chart. The band stayed in London for two years.

=== Ten Wheel Drive and solo career ===
Billed as "Goldie", she released the original version of the Carole King-Gerry Goffin composition "Goin' Back" in the spring of 1966. However, this single was withdrawn within a week by producer Andrew Loog Oldham due to disagreements with Goffin and King over altered lyrics. The song was covered by Dusty Springfield three months later, making the top 10 in the UK Singles Chart. It was recorded and released as a single the following year by the Byrds; it was included on their album The Notorious Byrd Brothers.

In 1969, Ravan and partners Aram Schefrin and Mike Zager formed Ten Wheel Drive, which lasted three years. They recorded three albums for Polydor Records: Construction number 1, Brief Replies, Peculiar Friends Are Better Than No Friends. Ravan left the band in 1972. She was signed to Columbia Records by Clive Davis, and she made one album for Columbia in 1972 titled Genya Ravan. She made four more solo albums during the 1970s.

"She oversings, the band's ordinary, and the lyrics (both hers and those she chooses) often get blowzy; the only grade-A cuts are 'Jerry's Pigeons' and (A plus) 'The Sweetest One.' So maybe I'm soft—maybe I just can't resist a real New York doll. In a woman who combines the hip cool of Lou Reed with the emotionality of Springsteen, a case of Joplinitis—a rare disease these days—is rather endearing."

— Review of Urban Desire in Christgau's Record Guide: Rock Albums of the Seventies (1981)

Ravan performed at the Atlanta Pop Festival, twice at Carnegie Hall and twice at Madison Square Garden, along with various clubs in Boston, Philadelphia, and New York City, including the famous CBGB. She appeared on television shows including The Mike Douglas Show, The Tonight Show Starring Johnny Carson, Della, and The Dick Cavett Show.

=== 2000s ===
Many Ten Wheel Drive tracks have been sampled by hip hop artists, including "Ain't Gonna Happen", which Jay-Z used in his song "1-900-Hustler" on the 2000 album The Dynasty. He also sampled Ravan's version of "Whipping Post" from her album Goldie Zelkowitz for his song "Oh My God" on the 2006 album Kingdom Come.

In 2011, the Rock and Roll Hall of Fame Museum included Goldie and the Gingerbreads in their "Women in Music" exhibit, which traveled from state to state. Genya Ravan toured in 2013, selling out New York City's Iridium.

In 2013, Ravan appeared at the Musical Instrument Museum in Phoenix, alongside legends like Wanda Jackson, Martha Reeves, Maria Muldaur and Tracy Nelson as part of the museum's "Women Who Rock" exhibit. She and Reeves discovered professional connections in that both worked with Richard Perry and were signed by Clive Davis. Further, one of the first songs Ravan learned when she came to the US was "What Did I Do to Be So Black and Blue", made famous by Fats Waller; Reeves had performed the song while starring in the road show of Ain't Misbehavin'. The two planned on working on a future project together.

A retrospective of her career is the subject of the Off Broadway musical Rock and Roll Refugee, which was profiled on National Public Radio's Weekend Edition Sunday on February 14, 2016.

== Producer ==
Ravan has worked as a producer for multiple record labels. Among others, she was responsible for the debut album Young Loud and Snotty by the punk rock band Dead Boys (1977), and the comeback album Siren by Ronnie Spector (1980). She also contributed vocals to the latter album. In 2001 Ravan discovered Tripod at CBGB and produced their demo CD, adding backup vocals to one track. She brought David Lasley and his blue-eyed soul group Rosie to Mike Berniker at RCA, got them a deal and produced their album Better Late Than Never.

== Radio host ==
In 2006, Steven Van Zandt recruited Ravan to host two monthly radio shows: Chicks and Broads, playing women from the 1950s to the present day, and Goldies Garage, which featured unsigned bands. Ravan said, "So much talent out there and not enough places for them to be heard anymore" on Van Zandt's Underground Garage radio channel, which aired on SiriusXM Satellite Radio in North America and on SiriusXM Internet Radio worldwide. Ravan joined a team of hosts that includes original Rolling Stones manager/producer Andrew Loog Oldham, whom she worked with as Goldie.

== Discography ==
- Construction #1, Ten Wheel Drive with Genya Ravan, 1969
- Brief Replies, Ten Wheel Drive with Genya Ravan, 1970
- Peculiar Friends, Ten Wheel Drive with Genya Ravan, 1971
- Genya Ravan, 1972
- They Love Me, They Love Me Not, 1973
- Goldie Zelkowitz, 1974
- Urban Desire, 1978 - AUS #66
- ...And I Mean It!, 1979
- Best of Ten Wheel Drive Compilation, 1995
- For Fans Only!, 2003
- Genya Ravan Live, 2006
- Undercover, 2010
- Cheesecake Girl, 2013 Aha Music
- Icon, 2019 Aha Music
- Genya Live at CBGB (recorded in 2005) 2020 (Remaster/Reissue of 2006 CD) (Rum Bar Records)
- Thinking About the Good Times: Complete Recordings 1964-1966 Compilation, Goldie and the Gingerbreads, 2021 Ace

== Publications ==
- Lollipop Lounge, Memoirs of a Rock And Roll Refugee, Genya Ravan, 2004, ISBN 0-8230-8362-4.

== Stage production ==
In early 2016, Royal Family Productions produced a workshop for a musical based on the life of Genya Ravan titled Rock and Roll Refugee.

== Movies ==
In the movie The Warriors (1979), the song that plays when Cochise, Rembrandt and Vermin are in the Lizzie's HQ is "Love Is a Fire" by Genya Ravan. The song is featured on The Warriors soundtrack album.

Ravan was portrayed by Stana Katic in the 2013 film CBGB.
