= Frank Secich =

American musician (born 1951)

- Born: June 14, 1951 (age 75); Sharon, Pennsylvania
- Genres: Rock, Powerpop
- Occupations: Musician, songwriter, author, record producer
- Instruments: Bass, guitar
- Years active: 1969–present
- Labels: Mercury, Playboy, Bomp, Pop Detective
- Formerly of: Blue Ash, Stiv Bators band, Club Wow, Deadbeat Poets

Frank Secich (born June 14, 1951) is an American rock musician, songwriter, author and record producer. He was the bass player and founding member of the group Blue Ash from 1969 to 1979 and guitarist and bassist for the Stiv Bators band from 1979 until 1981. He played in the Cleveland-based group Club Wow with Jimmy Zero of the Dead Boys from 1982 to 1985 and produced the Ohio band the Infidels from 1985 to 1990. He is currently the rhythm guitarist for the Deadbeat Poets who were formed in 2006 in Youngstown, Ohio. Frank Secich's autobiography "Circumstantial Evidence" was published by High Voltage Publishing of Australia in 2015. His second book "Not That Way Anymore" was published in November 2023 by High Voltage Publishing. His current band, The Deadbeat Poets are on Pop Detective Records, which is owned by Mark Hershberger.

== Discography ==
=== LP's and CD's ===
- Blue Ash-No More, No Less-1973 Mercury LP SRM1-666
- Blue Ash- Front Page News-1977 LP PZ 34918 U.S., Venezuela
- Stiv Bators-Disconnected-1980 Bomp! LP 4015 U.S.], Canada, Finland, Germany, Japan
- Stiv Bators-The Lord And The New Creatures LP France 1983
- Infidels-Mad About That Girl 1985 LP France Producer
- Infidels-9:25 And Seven Seconds-1987 LP-Producer
- Infidels-Wondrous Strange-1989-CD Producer
- Stiv Bators-Stiv Bators/Night Of The Living Dead Boys-1989 Revenge 16/18 France
- Dead Boys- Night Of The Living Dead Boys-Bonus Tracks-1994 Bomp!
- Stiv Bators-L.A. L.A. 1994 Bomp! BCD 4046 U.S., Japan
- Stiv Bators-Les Genies Du Rock (Sonic Reducer) 1994 Editions Atlas France
- Blue Ash-Around Again-2CD(A Collection Of Rarities From The Vault)2004 Not Lame NL 093
- Blue Ash Peppermint Tapes 2004 CD Bonus Album with Not Lame's Around Again
- Stiv Bators-Disconnected-25th Anniversary Edition-2004 Bomp! 4015–2
- Stiv Bators- LA Confidential-2004 Bomp! BCD/LP 4089
- Blue Ash -The Alternate Around Again-2007-Powerpop Lovers
- Deadbeat Poets-Notes From The Underground 2007 Pop Detective CD U.S., Japan
- Blue Ash-No More, No Less-2008 Collectors' Choice CD
- Blue Ash-Live At Packard Music Hall 01/31/1974 bonus CD from Kool Kat Music 2008
- Deadbeat Poets-Circustown-2010 CD Pop Detective
- Deadbeat Poets-Youngstown Vortex Sutra (The British Version)CD-2011 Pop Detective
- Deadbeat Poets-A Deadbeat Christmas-2011 CD Pop Detective
- Deadbeat Poets-American Stroboscope-2012 CD Pop Detective
- Deadbeat Poets -Hallelujah Anyway-2014 LP/CD Pop Detective
- Dead Boys -It's Cold Outside-2015 Double Live CD Time Bomb Records Japan
- Blue Ash- Hearts & Arrows-2015 2 LP Set- You Are The Cosmos Spain
- Deadbeat Poets-El Camino Real 101-2016 LP You Are The Cosmos Spain
- Deadbeat Poets-Strange Tales From The Hussmann Building-2016 (Best Of 2007–2014) LP/CD Pop Detective Records
- Blue Ash-15 Number Ones In A Perfect World-2016 CD- You Are The Cosmos Spain
- Club Wow-Nowhere Fast-2016 CD/DVD-Zero Hour Records Australia
- Blue Ash-No More, No Less-2023 Blue Colored Vinyl LP Reissue-Uranus Records-Estonia
- Stiv Bators-Disconnected- 2024 Vinyl LP Reissue- 2 Bonus Cuts Munster Records-Spain
- Stiv Bators-Pop Goes The Weasel- 2025 Vinyl LP Collection Of Stiv Bators' Solo Work & Rarities-Munster Records Spain
- Blue Ash-Dinner At Mr. Billy's-2026 Vinyl LP & CD of early rarities Peppermint Records

=== Singles and EP's ===
- Blue Ash-Abracadabra (Have You Seen Her?) b/w Dusty Old Fairgrounds 1973
- Blue Ash-I Remember A Time b/w Plain To See 1973
- Blue Ash-Anytime At All b/w She's So Nice 1974
- Blue Ash-Look At You Now b/w Singing And Dancing Away 1977
- Blue Ash-You Are All I Need b/w Jazel Jane 1977
- Stiv Bators-It's Cold Outside b/w The Last Year 1979 U.S., England, Germany
- Stiv Bators-Not That Way Anymore b/w Circumstantial Evidence 1980 U.S., Australia, Germany, Spain
- Stiv Bators-Too Much To Dream b/w Make Up Your Mind 1981
- Stiv Bators-Too Much To Dream-Newslines Vol. 1 EP 1981 Germany
- Infidels-Mad About That Girl b/w A Thousand Years Ago 1985 Producer
- Infidels-The Infidels X 4 EP 1986 Producer
- Infidels-I Can't Make You Mine b/w Everywhere I Go 1987 Producer
- Dead Boys-All The Way Down (Poison Lady) b/w The Nights Are So Long 1987 Producer
- Infidels-Run Away From You Flexi-Disc Hartbeat! #8 Germany 1988 Producer
- Infidels-Final Solution Flexi-Disc Hartbeat! #9 Germany 1989 Producer
- Dead Boys-It's All Right b/w War Zone 2000
- Deadbeat Poets-Johnny Sincere-Pop Detective Records 2013
- Stiv Bators & David Quinton-Make Up Your Mind- Ugly Pop Records 041 2013 Bass Canada
- Stiv Bators & Dead Boys-Last Stand 1980 EP- Ugly Pop Records 042 2013 Bass-Vocals Canada
- Blue Ash 4 song 7-inch EP-You Are The Cosmos 2014 Spain
- Deadbeat Poets Joe The Mynah Bird EP-2015 KOTJ 11 Spain
- Deadbeat Poets It's Summertime b/w I'll Be Standing By-CD Single-Pop Detective Records CDEP 10 2016
- Blue Ash Abracadabra (Have You Seen Her?) b/w Hippy, Hippy Shake-Get Hip Records Archive Series 7-inch vinyl 2016
- Stiv Bators It's Cold Outside b/w The Last Year 2024 7 inch vinyl reissue Munster Records-Spain

=== Compilations ===
- Stiv Bators-"It's Cold Outside" Rock Lines-Line LLP 5014 Germany 1979
- Stiv Bators-"It's Cold Outside" Yesterday's Sound Today Line Records Germany 1979
- Stiv Bators-"Circumstantial Evidence" & "I'll Be Alright" Where The Action Is!-Bomp! 1980
- Stiv Bators-"It's Cold Outside" & "The Last Year" Romantics And Friends-Quark Catch 3 1980
- Stiv Bators-"A Million Miles Away" Experiments In Destiny-Bomp! 4016 (2) 1980
- Stiv Bators-"I Wanna Forget You (Just The Way You Are)" The Best of Bomp! 1982
- Infidels-"You Should See Yourself" We Can Work It Out-GMG 75018 France 1987 Producer
- Hard Luck & Kashmyre-"Love Only Me" & "47 Heaven" Scream Out Loud Vol. I 1987 Producer
- Blue Ash-"Dusty Old Fairgrounds" The Songs Of Bob Dylan-Start 20 England 1989
- Infidels-"Any Way You Want It" The Munster Dance Hall Favorites Vol. III- Munster 003 Spain 1990 Producer
- Blue Ash-"Dusty Old Fairgrounds" I Shall Be Unreleased: The Songs Of Bob Dylan - Rhino 70518 1991
- Stiv Bators-"Boxed Set Of 5 Singles" I Wanna Be A Dead Boy- Munster 7029 Spain 1992
- Stiv Bators-"The Last Year" Destination Bomp!-Bomp! 4048 1994
- Stiv Bators -"It's Cold Outside" Revenge Records France 1995
- Stiv Bators-"Make Up Your Mind" The Roots Of Powerpop-Bomp! 1996
- Blue Ash-"Abracadabra (Have You Seen Her?)" POPTOPIA! Power Pop Classics Of The '70's - Rhino 72728 1997 U.S., Japan
- Blue Ash-"Abracadabra (Have You Seen Her?)" 100% Fun-A Power Pop Collection -Hiro 1001 Japan 1997
- Stiv Bators-"It's Cold Outside" Powerpearls Vol. 6 1999
- Blue Ash-"Anytime At All" + 3 The History Of Powerpop Vol. 1 Cleveland 2000
- Infidels-"A Thousand Years Ago" Shake Some Action Vol. 2 SSA Records Spain 2001 Producer
- Stiv Bators-"Not That Way Anymore" Teenline # 7 Hyped-2-Death Records 2001
- Stiv Bators-"I'll Be Alright" Teenline #8 Hyped-2-Death Records 2003
- Blue Ash-"Pleasant Dreams" International Pop Overthrow Vol. 7 - Not Lame NL 101 2004
- Blue Ash-"Say Goodbye" & "She Cried For 15 Years" Planet Of The Popboomerang 2 Australia 2005
- Infidels-"Mad About That Girl" Home Runs Vol. 3 Sounds Asleep Records Sweden 2005 Producer
- Stiv Bators-"The Last Year" Home Runs Vol. 3 Sounds Asleep Records Sweden 2005
- Dukes Of Earl- " Him Or Me" He Put The Bomp! In The Bomp A Tribute To Greg Shaw Bomp/ Vivid Sound Records U.S., Japan 2007 Producer/Artist
- Deadbeat Poets "Ernest T" Unsigned, Sealed & Delivered-Frontline Records-2007 Canada
- Blue Ash "Here We Go Again" The Blog Gems Vol. 6 1973-86-Powerpop Lovers-2007 CD
- Deadbeat Poets "People These Days" IPO Vol. 13 Not Lame 2010
- Deadbeat Poets "The Truth About Flying Saucers" Power Pop Prime Vol. 7 2011
- Blue Ash "The Boy Won't Listen" Power Pop Prime Vol. 2 2012
- Blue Ash "Abracadabra" Glam-O-Rama Vol. 3 2015 UK
- Deadbeat Poets "She's With Me" Unsigned, Sealed and Delivered No. 9 CD 3101 Bullseye Records 2016 Canada
- Deadbeat Poets "I'll Be Standing By" Twelve String High (2LP & CD) You Are The Cosmos 2016 Spain
- Deadbeat Poets "Joe The Mynah Bird" Godless America-2017-Cassette Only Release
- Stiv Bators, Deadbeat Poets (No Compromise, No Regrets) Soundtrack 2019-A Million Miles Away. You Don't Go Away, The Stiv Bators Ghost Tour, Evil Boy. The Psychedelic Gas Station
- Deadbeat Poets (Tribute To Sonny Vincent) 2019-"It's Summertime"
- Deadbeat Poets "Riding The Dog" Rolling Stone: Life & Death Of Brian Jones (Original Soundtrack) MVD 2020
- Blue Ash "It's All In Your Mind" Peppermint Productions LP "Rat Race" 2022
- Deadbeat Poets "Sunglass City" Nightclubbing (The Birth Of Punk Rock In New York City) MVD (Original Soundtrack) 2022
- Blue Ash "Abracadabra (Have You Seen Her?)" Cherry Red Records "Looking For The Magic" American Powerpop In The 70's 2023 UK 3-CD Set
- Stiv Bators, "Not That Way Anymore", Club Wow "What's With You?" and Infidels "I Can't Make You Mine" (producer) on "I Wanna Be A Teen Again" on Cherry Red Records UK. 3CD Boxed Set Compilation 2025
- Blue Ash "Dusty Old Fairgrounds" I Shall Be Released-Covers Of Bob Dylan 1963-1970 Cherry Red/Strawberry Records UK 2025

=== Songs recorded by other artists ===
- A Million Miles Away (Secich)-Michael Monroe-Finland, Japan
- A Million Miles Away (Secich)-Simon Chainsaw & The Forgotten Boys-Brazil
- A Million Miles Away (Secich) - Gonzo Sombrero - Finland
- A Thousand Years Ago (Drivere-Secich)-The Infidels-U.S., France, Spain
- Abracadabra (Have You Seen Her?) (Secich-Bartolin)-The Records-U.S., England, Greece, New Zealand, Japan
- Crime In The Streets (Cabaniss-Quinton-Secich) The Pop Machine
- Don't Go Away (Zero-Secich) Stiv Bators France
- Everywhere I Go (Secich)-Infidels
- Everywhere I Go (Secich)-Billy Sullivan
- Evil Boy (Zero-Secich)-Stiv Bators & The Evil Boys-Germany
- Evil Boy (Zero-Secich) WOTEM MF
- Evil Boy (Zero-Secich)-Lucky Sperm Club
- Evil Boy as "Evil Girl" (Zero-Secich)-Connie Thunders
- Evil Boy as "I'm An Evil Bear"(Zero-Secich) Three Speeds
- I Wanna Forget You (Just The Way You Are)-(Secich-Bators)-Adam Bomb (Music)-U.S., England
- I Wanna Forget You (Just The Way You Are)-(Secich-Bators)- Sybil
- I'll Be Alright (Secich-Bators) Hundred Million Martians-Finland
- The Last Year (Secich-Bators)-Michael Monroe and Rich Jones Duo-Finland
- The Last Year (Secich-Bators)-The Monotors-Spain
- The Last Year (Secich-Bators)-Palmflower
- The Last Year (Secich-Bators)-Riger János-Hungary
- The Last Year (Secich-Bators)-Joe Pugsley
- The Last Year (Secich-Bators)-The Golden Arms
- Not That Way Anymore (Secich-Bators) Bad Luck Charms
- Not That Way Anymore (Secich-Bators)-Road Vultures
- Not That Way Anymore (Secich-Bators) The Tragic Zeroes
- Not That Way Anymore (Secich-Bators) Starpower
- Not That Way Anymore (Secich-Bators) Unko Atama
- Not That Way Anymore (Secich-Bators) Nikki Sudden-England
- Not That Way Anymore (Secich-Bators) Stiletto Boys
- Not That Way Anymore (Secich-Bators) Billie Joe Armstrong-No Fun Mondays
- Not That Way Anymore (Secich-Bators) Luv Bites-Brazil
- Not That Way Anymore (Secich-Bators) RoadBump-Netherlands
- Not That Way Anymore (Secich-Bators) Miqu December-Finland
- The Girl Downstairs (Sullivan-Secich-Zero)-Billy Sullivan
- The Stiv Bators Ghost Tour (Secich)-Room Full Of Strangers
- Tonight's My Lucky Night (Secich-Bartolin)-Finkers-Australia, Japan
- You Don't Go Away (Zero-Secich)-Vibeke Saugestad-Norway
- You Don't Go Away (Zero-Secich)-Alpha Kitty
- You Don't Know What It's Like (Secich-Bartolin) Candy Snatchers

=== Music videos ===
- Who's Hieronymus Bosch & Why Is He Saying These Terrible Things About Me?-Deadbeat Poets2012
- Johnny Sincere-Deadbeat Poets- Pop Detective Records 2013
- Life In The War Zone-There's A Fire-Live At Cleveland Agora Club Wow DVD-Zero Hour Records 2016 Australia
- I'll Be Standing By-Deadbeat Poets Pop Detective Records 2016
- It's Summertime-Deadbeat Poets Pop Detective Records 2016

=== Music in films ===
- D.O.A.: A Rite of Passage
- Smother 2007 Official Trailer- Blue Ash-Can't Get Her Off My Mind
- Return Of The Living Dead Boys-2008- Bonus feature Interview Frank Secich and Stiv Bators
- The Greenman 2011- directed by Joe Shelby-The Goody Wagon- The Green Man- Where Was I When I Needed Me?- Deadbeat Poets
- Made In Cleveland 2013- No Island Like The Mind, No Ship Like Beer-Deadbeat Poets
- Stiv (No Compromise, No Regrets) 2019- directed by Danny Garcia-A Million Miles Away. You Don't Go Away, The Stiv Bators Ghost Tour, Evil Boy. The Psychedelic Gas Station
- Stiv (No Compromise, No Regrets) 2019- official film trailer-Evil Boy
- Stiv Bators 2019 Soundtrack (No Compromise, No Regrets)-The Stiv Bators Ghost Tour, Evil Boy, The Psychedelic Gas Station, You Don't Go Away
- Rolling Stone: Life and Death of Brian Jones 2020-Riding The Dog
- Nightclubbing-The Birth of Punk Rock In NYC 2022-Sunglass City, Film clip of Frank Secich and Stiv Bators
- Daisy Jones and the Six 2023 Amazon Prime Series Episode 1-Come And Get it-"Jazel Jane" (Secich-Bartolin) Blue Ash
- When Idora Rocked Frank Secich interview included-Gregory Films 2024

== Bibliography ==
- Circumstantial Evidence 2015 Frank Secich Autobiography High Voltage Publishing Australia
- Not That Way Anymore 2023 Frank Secich High Voltage Publishing Australia
