= Taborah Johnson =

Canadian singer and actress

- Born: Taborah Johnson
- Occupations: Actress, singer
- Years active: 1979–present

Taborah Johnson, also known as Tabby Johnson, is a Canadian singer and actress. She is the sister of actor Clark Johnson and rock and jazz singer Molly Johnson.

She began her career in the Toronto production of Hair as a teenager. She was subsequently a backing vocalist for Rick James from 1979 to 1982, including on James' most famous single, "Super Freak". She subsequently returned to Toronto, where she sang as a jazz performer and as a backing vocalist for her sister Molly's band Infidels, and acted in occasional film and television roles, including appearances on Cagney and Lacey, Airwaves, E.N.G., and Clark's Homicide: Life on the Street, and regular roles in the children's series Polka Dot Door, The Big Comfy Couch as Auntie Macassar from 1992 to 1996, and Noddy, as well as the film A Holiday Romance. She appeared as the FLOTUS' Chief of Staff, assistant to the First Lady, in her brother Clark's feature film The Sentinel, and the 1984 HBO TV movie The Guardian with Lou Gossett and Martin Sheen.

She has also been working as creating voices in animation such as Star Wars: Ewoks, Star Wars: Droids, Babar, The Care Bears, Rupert, Beverly Hills Teens, Little Shop, Dinosaucers, Jayce and the Wheeled Warriors, Cars Toons, Madballs, My Pet Monster, Cadillacs and Dinosaurs, Ned's Newt, The Neverending Story, Flash Gordon, ALF: The Animated Series, Mythic Warriors: Guardians of the Legend, Bad Dog, Little Rosey, Blazing Dragons, The Busy World of Richard Scarry, Committed, George Shrinks, The Animal Shelf, Franklin, Quads!, Marvin the Tap-Dancing Horse, Little Bear, Silent Witness: What a Child Saw and The Adventures of Sam & Max: Freelance Police.

In February 2005, Johnson joined Toronto jazz station CJRT-FM as the part-time host of a weekly, two-hour, gospel music show. She left CJRT barely two months later. In the summer of 2005, she appeared on Toronto news/talk station CFRB, filling in for Mark Elliot on his late night talk radio shift. In September, the station named her to a permanent, part-time, shift on Saturdays from 4 to 6 p.m. EST. She is no longer employed by the station.
