= Norman Orenstein =

Canadian musician

- Origin: Canada
- Genres: Rock; Film score
- Occupations: Composer, record producer, musician
- Instruments: Piano, Guitar
- Website: www.normanorenstein.com

Norman Orenstein is a Canadian composer, record producer, and musician.

== Career ==
Orenstein is the co-founder of the rock/soul band Infidels, and Alta Moda, and was previously associated with the bands Michaele Jordana and the Poles, among others.

As of 1996, Orenstein split his ties with I.R.S. Records / Capitol Records, and is now an independent, unsigned artist. Orenstein began creating music early in his life and cites his mother's blues and jazz record collection and Jimi Hendrix as inspirations. After being involved with multiple rock and R&B bands in the 1970s, Orenstein collaborated with singer Molly Johnson in Toronto and they began creating their own music under the moniker Alta Moda. Alta Moda's first album release was on the Epic label for CBS Records, and had some commercial success. In 1990, Orenstein and Johnson signed with Miles Copeland III's I.R.S. Records. They recorded and released the first album as Infidels, which saw worldwide release and again some commercial success as well as a Juno Award in 1991. While still keeping a hand in songwriting and record production, Orenstein began composing for film in 1994, scoring Steve Di Marco's Spike of Love. Orenstein continued to provide musical scores to film television productions and in 1999 formed the company Norman Orenstein Music Inc., which is based in Toronto, Ontario. Orenstein's musical score is featured in the 2008 release of George A. Romero's Diary of the Dead.

== Notable works ==
- Killer Queen (2019)
- Darker Than Night (2017)
- Disasters At Sea
- The Editor (2014)
- Jackie Boy (2015)
- Kidnap Capital (2016)
- Diary of the Dead (2007)
- Dexter
- Forensic Factor
- Prisoners of Gravity
- American Psycho 2
- Alta Moda
- Infidels
- Cube Zero
- Cube 2: Hypercube
- Stir of Echoes: The Homecoming
- The White Raven (1998)
- Ancients Behaving Badly
- Love Thy Neighbor
