= Spellfury =

- Genre: Comedy; Action; Fantasy; Adventure
- Created by: Travis Gordon
- Written by: Travis Gordon
- Directed by: Travis Gordon
- Starring: Julie O'Halloran; Robbie Drebitt; Penu Chalykoff; Ian Quick; Matt Ficner
- Original language: English
- No. of seasons: 2
- No. of episodes: 12

Production
- Executive producer: Jason Devlin

Original release
- Release: 2008 – present

Spellfury is an action comedy fantasy adventure web series written and directed by Travis Gordon and stars Julie O'Halloran as Druinia. Spellfury is available on YouTube, but can also be watched on iTunes, Blip.tv, and the webseries directory Scifinal.

== Synopsis ==
Season one of the webseries Spellfury focuses on the adventures of an elf named Druinia and a magic sword. Druinia is being hunted by an evil sorcerer named Kruskull who claims the sword is his. Druinia is on a quest to avenge her father's death.

== Cast ==
- Julie O'Halloran as Druinia
- Penu Chalykoff as Kruskull
- Penu Chalykoff as Castle
- Ian Quick as Xorn
- Matt Ficner as Tarek
- Debra Ereaut as Velura
- Travis Gordon as Bip
- Lisa Forrester as Davinika
- Brant Daniluk as Draka

== Plot ==
=== Season 1 (2008–2010) ===
Title	Writer(s)	Director	Original airdate	#
"Hit the Ground Running"	Travis Gordon	Travis Gordon	08/12/2008	1
An elf named Druinia and a human named Tarek are being chased through a forest by a demon.
"Play Misty For Me"	Travis Gordon	Travis Gordon	10/13/2008	2
The demon seems to want a sword that Tarek has and they do battle. His weapons don't seem to work. Druinia finds the magic sword.
"Sword Demon-stration"	Travis Gordon	Travis Gordon	03/06/2009	3
Druinia using the magic sword battles the demon it does damage. She eventually kills the demon and then finds out that Tarek has died from his wounds.
"You Drive Me Batty"	Travis Gordon	Travis Gordon	07/17/2009	4
Druinia upset that Tarek dies wanders the forest and is attacked by huge bats. The magic sword saves her and she starts a fire and thinks about her murdered father. A man comes out of the woods and pulls a small crossbow on Druiinia.
"Thrak Off"	Travis Gordon	Travis Gordon	09/24/2009	5
We meet the Grokonion Thrak and the evil sorcerer Kruskull. Kruskull desperately wants the sword back and Thrak quits. Kruskull tries to kill him. Xorn the thief takes the sword off of Druinia
"Fights, Plights and Insights"	Travis Gordon	Travis Gordon	11/12/2009	6
Kruskull the evil sorcerer still tries to kill Thrak the General who he believes has failed him. Druinia learns secrets about her murdered partner Tarek.
"Don't Cross Me"	Travis Gordon	Travis Gordon	12/28/2009	7
Thrak escapes Kruskull's castle and Druinia finds out more about how she got in her situation. Xorn threatens to kill Druinia.
"A Hairy Situation"	Travis Gordon	Travis Gordon	02/19/2010	8
Kruskull sends his beastmen and two demons after Druinia. Druinia gets the sword off of Xorn using magic powers but then is surrounded by Groks.
"Druinia Unleashed"	Travis Gordon	Travis Gordon	04/16/2010	9
Druinia surrounded by Groks shows off her skills with the sword only to be betrayed by Xorn.
"To Errol is Human"	Travis Gordon	Travis Gordon	06/09/2010	10
An unconscious Druinia is found by a cleric named Errol. Two remaining Groks attack them.
"I Get Grok'd Down, But I Get Up Again"	Travis Gordon	Travis Gordon	08/06/2010	11
Kruskull learns about what is happening with the sword. Errol and Druinia fight for their lives. Druinia gets injured and Errol heals her with magic.
"Out of the frying pan ..."	Travis Gordon	Travis Gordon	10/13/2010	12
Kruskull is visited by a fairy with information. Druinia and Errol light a fire and talk then go searching for Xorn. Kruskull enters a cave on a mountain and talks to a Dragon. Errol and Druinia meet up with the fire and ice demon.

=== Season 2 (2011-2017) ===
Title	Writer(s)	Director	Original airdate	#
"Mum's the Word"	Travis Gordon	Travis Gordon	08/12/2011	1
While Druinia and Errol hide from demons we meet some interesting characters in the Fullriver Tavern
"Very Ice To Meet You"	Travis Gordon	Travis Gordon	10/29/2011	2
Druinia and Errol face off against the demons and we learn more about Druinia's backstory in Fullriver.
"The Legendary Magicy Sword"	Travis Gordon	Travis Gordon	03/29/2012	3
The climax of the Demon Chase storyline.
"Spiders, Fairies and Dragons, Oh My! "	Travis Gordon	Travis Gordon	07/23/2012	4
Draka takes a hostage. Kruskull brings in a witch to free the dragon. Druinia finally gets the sword back.
"The Itsy Bitsy Spider"	Travis Gordon	Travis Gordon	08/23/2013	5
A new villainess named Davinica enters the scene while Druinia battles against a ten foot high spider.
"Warparty!"	Travis Gordon	Travis Gordon	07/24/2017	6
The final showdown with the massive spider and Draka the reptilian warrior finds love.

=== Season 3 (2021) ===
Title	Writer(s)	Director	Original airdate	#
"Snake in the Grass!"	Travis Gordon	Travis Gordon	02/09/2021	1
Druinia the Elf finally makes it to the town of Fullriver in her quest to avenge her father's death. Torg the dragon having been freed from the mountain by Davinika goes to meet Kruskull.

== Popularity ==
The Globe and Mail newspaper said that the webseries Spellfury has been watched 5 Million times. The first episode of Spellfury has been watched 256,780 times on YouTube. Owing to the number of views of the show, YouTube awarded Spellfury its own special show page. As of June 20, 2010, Spellfury was the second most watched show on the Koldcast.tv network. In May 2009 Wired.com reviewed Spellfury and in an article called "7 webotainers worth watching" mentioned "Canadian writer-director Travis Gordon throws World Of Warcraft video games, Lord of the Rings pomposity and Buffy The Vampire Slayer snark into the blender for this live-action series" The webseries was also reviewed by Tubefilter on July 8, 2009 in an article called "‘Spellfury’ is Low Budget, High Fantasy". Ain't It Cool News also reviewed the show as well. Spellfury the webseries (as of June 20, 2010) was the top rated show on the webseries directory Visioweb.tv.

Due to the popularity of the show a distribution deal was signed with David Samuels the owner of Koldcast.tv and has been airing there since August 4, 2009. David Samuels has said publicly that the Spellfury Series has over 200,000 views in 2010. In an interview with ScifiPulse writer Marx Pyle, Gordon said the series (as of April 2011) has over 3.5 million views.

Travis Gordon the writer/director of Spellfury won a Bronze for a Dramatic Short at the 2008 WorldFest-Houston International Film Festival for a short called Revelation. You can find interviews with Mr. Gordon about Spellfury in 3 places, PopCultureMonster.com who also reviewed it calling it "Magical, mystical and gripping", UberscifiGeek.com and Innsmouthfreepress.com.

A recent newspaper article (EMC Perth) on the evolution of the show and an interview with writer/director Travis Gordon called "Perth-based online show casts spell on viewers".

A video interview with Travis Gordon about Spellfury by the gamer site GenerationD20.

== Spellfury on television ==
A condensed version of Spellfury season one (12 minutes) appeared on National Canadian TV (Global tv) in December 2011 on the JR Digs Show. It was mentioned in the Ottawa Citizen. The portion of the show that had Spellfury in it is available to watch on YouTube.

== Spellfury film short ==
A film short that combined episodes 1-3 of Spellfury with a new ending was submitted to the 2009 DragonCon Film Festival and is available to watch on IMDb.

== Product placements ==
Spellfury Season 2 Episode 1 featured a product placement for Coors Light. Characters in the medieval tavern scene are seen drinking Coors Light and the bartender pours a Coors Light for Mumsy (3:51-4:17) Spellfury Season 2 Episode 2 has a product placement for Hobgoblin Beer, a logo of Hobgoblin is found on all the barrels in the tavern scene also in the medieval tavern scene a big barbarian comes in and orders two Hobgoblins off of the Bartender Velura
