= Julie O'Halloran =

Canadian actress

Julie O'Halloran is the lead actress in the webseries Spellfury. She plays an elf in the series called Druinia who is trying to avenge her father's death with a magic sword. Her character Druinia is mentioned in the article "12 most memorable leading ladies of fantasy-films."

In 2007, she played a villain called Heida Hurtz in a feature-length film called Mass Stupidity. She was also the lead actress in an award winning dramatic short called "Revelation" at the 2008 WorldFest-Houston International Film Festival.
