= No More, No Less =

Studio album by Blue Ash
- Released: May 1973
- Recorded: Early 1973 at Peppermint Studios, Youngstown, Ohio
- Genre: Power pop
- Length: 35:32
- Label: Mercury Records
- Producer: Paul Nelson (Executive Producer) and John Grazier

Blue Ash chronology
No More, No Less	Front Page News 1977. Around Again 2004

Professional ratings
Review scores
Source	Rating
Allmusic	4.5/5 stars
Christgau's Record Guide	B

No More, No Less is the first album by the Youngstown, Ohio band Blue Ash, released in 1973 on Mercury Records SRM1-666. (see 1973 in music). The album is composed mostly of originals with two covers, "Dusty Old Fairgrounds" by Bob Dylan and "Any Time at All" by The Beatles. The album remained out of print for many years until re-released on CD by Collector's Choice Music in late 2008.

== Track listing ==
Side One

1. "Abracadabra (Have You Seen Her?)" (Secich, Bartolin) – 3:05
2. "Dusty Old Fairgrounds" (Bob Dylan) - 2:46
3. "Plain to See" (Secich, Bartolin) - 2:41
4. "Just Another Game" (Secich, Bartolin) - 2:57
5. "I Remember A Time" (Secich, Bartolin) - 2:55
6. "Smash My Guitar" (Secich, Bartolin) - 3:15

Side Two

1. "Anytime At All" (John Lennon, Paul McCartney) - 2:19
2. "Here We Go Again" (Secich, Bartolin) - 3:23
3. "What Can I Do For You?" (Kendzor) - 3:50
4. "All I Want" (Secich, Bartolin) - 2:57
5. "Wasting My Time" (Secich, Bartolin) - 2:50
6. "Let There Be Rock" (Secich, Bartolin) - 2:33

== Personnel ==
- Jim Kendzor – Lead vocals, rhythm guitar
- Frank Secich – Bass guitar, background vocals
- Bill "Cupid" Bartolin – Lead guitar, background vocals
- David Evans – Drums, background vocals
