= Alta Moda =

Canadian funk rock band

- Origin: Toronto, Ontario, Canada
- Genres: Funk rock
- Years active: 1979-1988
- Labels: CBS Records, CBS Records
- Spinoffs: Infidels
- Past members: Molly Johnson; Norman Orenstein; Steven Gelineau; Etric Lyons

Alta Moda was a Canadian funk rock band formed in 1979 in Toronto. It originally consisted of singer Molly Johnson and guitarist Norman Orenstein. Drummer Steven Gelineau and bassist Etric Lyons were added in 1982 and 1983 respectively.

After performing for several years in Toronto and releasing the promotional single "Train" in 1986, the band signed to CBS Records and released their debut album, Alta Moda, in 1987.

The album received mixed reviews, with some critics saying it sounded too much like funk or disco; the band even faced some assertions that they were "too black" for the Canadian market. The album spawned the single "Julian", but the song was only a modest hit, peaking at #53 in the RPM Hot 100 chart the week of January 30, 1988. The album's other singles, "Notown (In Particular)" and "Cool Love", did not chart.

Alta Moda contributed a non-album track, "American Chaser", to the soundtrack of the 1986 television film Popeye Doyle.

The band declined a Juno Award nomination in the R&B category for "Julian", because they felt it was a miscategorization of the song.

Although Alta Moda had originally signed a six-album deal with CBS, they were dropped from the label after the album's poor sales. The band continued to perform live, on the lookout for another deal. Orenstein wrote and produced material for other artists, and Johnson performed jazz and blues with a backing band which later became Big Sugar.

Johnson and Orenstein signed a new deal with IRS Records in 1990, but changed the band's name to Infidels by the time of their 1991 album.
