= Noddy (TV series) =

Canadian television series

- Genre: Comedy; Fantasy
- Created by: Rick Siggelkow
- Based on: Classic Noddy in Toyland series by Enid Blyton
- Written by: Brian McConnachie; Sean Kelly; Lawrence S. Mirkin; Kate Barris; Jill Golick; Ellis Weiner; Rick Siggelkow
- Directed by: Wayne Moss; Steve Wright
- Starring: Sean McCann; Katie Boland; Max Morrow; Kyle Kassardjian; Jayne Eastwood; Jim Calder; Nikki Pascetta; Gil Filar
- Theme music composer: Dennis Scott
- Opening theme: "The Noddy Shop" performed by the cast
- Ending theme: "The Noddy Shop" (instrumental) “Anything Can Happen at Christmas” (instrumental) (only for Christmas special)
- Composers: Stacey Hersh (score); Dennis Scott (songs); Paul K. Joyce (original score)
- Country of origin: Canada (Note: The Noddy's Toyland Adventures wrap-around segments are produced in the United Kingdom.)
- Original language: English
- No. of seasons: 2
- No. of episodes: 66

Production
- Executive producer: Rick Siggelkow
- Producer: Jim Corston
- Running time: 30 minutes
- Production companies: BBC Worldwide Americas; Catalyst Entertainment Inc. Enid Blyton Ltd.

Original release
- Network: TVOntario (TVOKids)/CBC Television (CBC Playground)
- Release: 7 September 1998 – 11 December 1999

Related
- Noddy's Toyland Adventures

Noddy (also known as The Noddy Shop and Noddy in Toyland) is a Canadian live-action/animated children's television series based on Enid Blyton's children's book series of the same name featuring the animated episodes from Noddy's Toyland Adventures. Created by Rick Sigglekow of Shining Time Station fame, the show was broadcast from 7 September 1998 to 11 December 1999, on TVOntario and CBC Television in Canada and on PBS in the United States.

== Premise ==
The stories in the Noddy shop (NODDY here being an acronym for Notions, Oddities, Doodads and Delights of Yesterday) centers on siblings Kate and Truman Tomten, who, with their friend Daniel "DJ" Johnson, come to play at their grandfather Noah's vintage toy shop in Littleton Falls, and were collected by their (unseen) parents at the end of the day, implying the episodes were set after school, during school holidays or weekends.

The toys in the shop are known to come alive when nobody is looking. In the second season, Truman gained the ability to talk to the toys in the shop, and Noddy gained a more prominent role in the live action segments, often interacting with the toys and Truman. Most of the stories were repeated from the first season with some minor additions, as well as also introducing new stories coming from the fourth and final season of Noddy's Toyland Adventures.

Most episodes had a moral message, which was conveyed with a Noddy story, usually told by Kate using the Noddy dolls in the shop, which the viewer saw as re-dubbed and re-scored Noddy animations. The moral message was also a theme in a song sung by the shop's population of anthropomorphic toys. There was sometimes a second song, usually a re enactment of a popular folk tale. These songs were written by Nashville-based composer Dennis Scott.

== Characters ==
=== Humans ===
- Noah Tomten (played by Sean McCann) is a former old salt and owner of the Noddy Shop.
- Katherine "Kate" Tomten (played by Katie Boland) is Noah's granddaughter and Truman's older sister.
- Daniel "D.J." Johnson (played by Kyle Kass) is Kate and Truman's friend.
- Truman Tomten (played by Max Morrow) is Noah's grandson and Kate's younger brother.
- Agatha Flugelschmidt (née Tomten) (played by Jayne Eastwood) is Noah's younger scatterbrained sister and Kate and Truman's great aunt. She owns a hat shop next door to the Noddy Shop.
- Officer Carl Spiffy (played by Dan Redican) is Littleton Falls' senior crossing guard. He is often confident in some suspicious activities. He then retired at the end of the first season.
- Bud Topper (played by Neil Crone) is Littleton Falls' second crossing guard. He is a young crossing guard who often gets into practical jokes and hilarious chases around town. He replaced Carl Spiffy, starting with the second-season episode "Little Swap of Horrors".
- Davy Gladhand (played by Gerry Quigely) is a quirky, wisecracking salesman. He often tells jokes and is good friends with Noah. In the regular episodes, he wears a straw boater hat, while in the Christmas episode "Anything Can Happen at Christmas", he wears a red bowler hat.
- Hilda Sweetly (played by Taborah Johnson) is an ice cream saleswoman dressed in an ice cream costume. She and Noah are romantically involved by the end of the series.
- April May McJune (played by Gina Sorell) is a cautious animal wrangler. She can take care of animals such as a rabbit, a parrot, or even a skunk.
- Charlene von Pickings (played by Fiona Reid) is a posh and snobby rich woman who speaks with a British accent and is very difficult to impress.
- Jake (played by Albert Rosos) is a teenager who visits the Noddy Shop. In "Following Directions", he was sent to give Agatha and the kids directions while Noah takes off when he has the flu.
- Itchy (played by Stephen Joffe) is Aunt Agatha's grandson.
- Rox (played by Lauren Collins) is a girl who, along with Grit, challenged Kate and D.J. to a race in Sports Day.
- Grit (played by Jake Goldsbie) is a boy who, along with Rox, challenged Kate and D.J. to a race in Sports Day.
- Sam (played by Daniel Magder) is Truman's new friend. In "Ask Permission", he takes the mermaid without asking Noah, so Truman decides to tell Sam the Noddy story about Noddy setting a trap for Sammy Sailor, like the one Kate told him.
- Robbie MacRhino (played by Burke Lawrence) is a mascot dressed as a green rhino in a traditional Scottish kilt.
- Ed Caruso (played by Greg Cross) is Robbie MacRhino's singing presenter who introduces Robbie MacRhino in song.

=== Toys and Antiques ===
- Noddy (voiced by Catherine Disher) is the central character of the animated segments. During the live-action segments in Season 2, he is mostly still, but occasionally wanders around and talks to Truman and often the shop toys.
- Warloworth Q. Weasel (usually known simply as Warlow) (voiced by Frank Meschkuleit) is a malicious weasel in a bowler hat who resides in a Jack-in-the-box and always plays tricks on the other toys, but usually gets his comeuppance. When he pops out of the box, he sings and tap dances in his tap shoes on his feet.
- Bonita Flamingo (voiced by Frank Meschkuleit) is a bright orange plush flamingo dressed like Carmen Miranda. She speaks in an exaggerated Spanish accent, often saying things in Spanish and English. She acts motherly to Truman.
- Johnny Crawfish (voiced by James Rankin) is a lobster who tells a lot of jokes and resides in a fish tank, and sometimes plays rock and roll songs on the piano. He is inspired by Johnny Carson.
- Big Ears (voiced by Benedict Campbell) is a friendly gnome who is Noddy's helper and father figure in the animated segments. Unlike Noddy, he never moves or talks at all during the live-action segments.
- Sherman (voiced by James Rankin) is a clockwork turtle with wheels like a tank, who wears an army helmet.
- Rusty (voiced by Matt Ficner) is a toy clown who is good friends with Sherman, and always rides on his back.
- Planet Pup (voiced by James Rankin) is a small robotic dog, supposedly from outer space. He was the first toy to interact with Truman and gets along with him.
- Lichtenstein (voiced by Matt Ficner) is a beer tankard shaped like a Viking's head, usually referred to simply as "Stein" and is based on actor Arnold Schwarzenegger. He doesn't speak much, but could usually be seen singing along with the songs. When Litchenstein does speak, he has a noticeable German accent, and ends many of his sentences with "Ja".
- Island Princess (voiced by Alyson Court) is a wooden carving, rather like a ship's figurehead, in a traditional Hawaiian costume. She sees everything that goes on in the shop, and sometimes alerts the toys to the pranks of the Goblins.
- Gertie Gator (voiced by Taborah Johnson) is a plastic alligator who stands on two legs, wears red glasses, a purple dress and carries a matching umbrella. In the song from the episode "Growing Lies", Gertie Gator wears a yellow choir gown, indicating that the song is gospel and pop.
- Granny Duck (voiced by Noreen Young) is a wise wooden duck on wheels who wears a red hat, glasses and who usually speaks in rhyme.
- The Do-Wop Penguins are four penguins who never speak and only sing in every episode, sometimes as Gertie Gator's backing group. Along with the Ruby Reds, they often provide short interludes introducing the Noddy story, or a turning point in the action of the episode.
- Ruby Reds is a box of five fake lips who also have no spoken dialogue, but sing in every episode, sometimes as Johnny Crawfish's backing group.
- Fred (voiced by Matt Ficner) and Gingersnap (voiced by James Rankin) are a couple of porcelain pig figurines in matching outfits – one blue, one pink – and berets. They speak in an exaggerated French accent.
- Whiny and Whimper (voiced by James Rankin and Matt Ficner) are two baby dolls, one male, one female – one is dressed in pink, the other in blue – in a cradle. They often cry at any tense situation like lost rattles. They are usually found singing with the other characters. In one episode, a miscast spell by Boobull causes them to speak like teenagers.
- Shorty Salt Shaker (voiced by Frank Meschkuleit) and Slim Pepper Shaker (voiced by James Rankin) are salt and pepper shakers shaped like saguaro, with cowboy hats and bandannas – one red, one blue. They speak with a Southern accent.
- Gaylord Gumball (voiced by Frank Meschkuleit) is a wise gumball machine whose handles and slot resemble a moustache and mouth.
- Wind-up Teeth are a pair of wind up chattery teeth that chatters when excited or scared.

==== Minor human characters ====
- Gus (played by George Buza) is a garbage truck driver who appears in the episode "Going Bananas". He was first introduced when he stopped by the Noddy Shop to inform Noah that he shall get himself a banana, as well as a hat. Unfortunately, the battery in his truck died, so he decided to stick around until he gets back on the road.
- Seymour Polutski (played by Jeff Pustil) is the main antagonist of the series finale episode "Closing Up Shop". When Noah was lacking consumers, he accepted the deal to buy the shop and attempted to turn the Noddy Shop into a cigar store. When the kids tell him that smoking was not permitted, he snaps at them. Later on, when Polutski was about to light the cigar, Disrupto stops him and informs him smoking is prohibited in the store and confiscates his cigar with his left claw. But before Polutski can retrieve the cigar, he accidentally leans on the new toy Goopy Gary, used by Warloworth Q. Weasel as a trap. As a result, Polutski escapes the store, never to be seen again.
- Noah's Customers are assorted customers of Noah's at the Noddy Shop appear in either small or large roles in some episodes, like the people do in "Growing Lies" where three customers speak.

==== Minor toy characters ====
- The Tooth Fairy (played by Carol Kane) appeared in "The Tooth Fairy". She is a fairy who comes to see Truman in the shop who gets a loose tooth.
- Jack Frost (played by Gilbert Gottfried) appears in "Jack Frost is Coming to Town". He lives inside a snow globe.
- Disrupto is a robot who appears in "Big Bullies" and "The Human Touch". In the latter episode, it is revealed that he is capable of interacting with a computer. He then appeared in the series finale "Closing Up Shop", where he informs Seymour Polutski that smoking is not permitted in the shop before confiscating the cigar with his left claw and using the new toy Gooey Stewie as a trap, prompting Polutski to escape and withdrawing from his proposal.
- Angelina appears in "Part of the Family". She was forgotten in Noah's stockroom, but was brought to life upon the presence of a visitor named Julie.
- Annabelle (played by Betty White) appears in "Anything Can Happen at Christmas". She is Santa Claus' wife who comes to check on her favourite toys in the shop.
- The Sandman (played by Colin Fox) appears in "The Sandman Cometh". He casts a spell that puts everyone in the shop to sleep.

== Cast ==
=== Live-action cast ===
- Sean McCann as Noah Tomten, a former sailor who now runs an antique shop called the Noddy Shop.
- Katie Boland as Kate Tomten, Noah's granddaughter.
- Max Morrow as Truman Tomten, Noah's grandson.
- Kyle Kassardjian as Daniel "D.J." Johnson, Kate and Truman's friend.
- Jayne Eastwood as Agatha Flugelschmidt, Noah's scatterbrained sister, who owns the hat shop next door. She is good friends with the children, who call her Aunt Agatha. She is married, but her husband is unseen.
- Dan Redican as Officer Carl Spiffy (season 1 only)
- Neil Crone as Officer Bud Topper (season 2 only)
- Taborah Johnson as Miss Hilda Sweetly, an ice cream vendor who pushes a cart dressed as a giant strawberry ice cream cone (vanilla in an early episode). There is implication that she and Noah are romantically attracted to each other.
- Gerry Quigley as Davy Gladhand, a salesman.
- Gina Sorell as April May McJune, a Brownie leader and friend of Aunt Agatha's.
- Albert Rosos as Jake, a teenager who visits the Noddy Shop.
- Stephen Joffe as Itchy, Aunt Agatha's nephew.
- Jake Goldsbie as Grit, a boy in Sports Day.
- Lauren Collins as Rox, a girl in Sports Day.
- Daniel Magder as Sam, Truman's new friend.
- Burke Lawrence as Robbie MacRhino, a mascot dressed as a green rhino in a traditional Scottish kilt.
- Greg Cross as Ed Caruso, Robbie MacRhino's singing presenter.
- Jim Calder as Lurk Goblin, the father in a family of goblins who live in a small doll's house. He and his wife create much of the drama in the series, but he doesn't mean any harm. He mainly talks gibberish, with a few recognisable words.
- Nikki Pascetta as Snipe Goblin, the mother of the Goblin Family. Like her husband Lurk, she mainly speaks in gibberish, doesn't mean any harm, and cares deeply for their son.
- Gil Filar as Boobull Goblin, the son of Lurk and Snipe. Despite being the youngest, he is intelligent, speaks proper English, and appears to be in charge of his Mom and Dad.

=== Guest stars ===
- Carol Kane as the Tooth Fairy (in "The Tooth Fairy")
- Fiona Reid as Charlene von Pickings (in "To the Rescue", "Telling the Whole Truth", "How Rude" and "Be Patient")
- Marc Donato as Dewey (in "Mixed Up Masks")
- Harry Anderson as Jack Fable (in "The Magic Show")
- Gilbert Gottfried as Jack Frost (in "Jack Frost is Coming to Town")
- Gerard Parkes as Wally the Wanderer (in "Noah's Leaving")
- Betty White as Annabelle (in "Anything Can Happen at Christmas")
- Colin Fox as the Sandman (in "The Sandman Cometh")
- Graham Harley as Rodney Styx (in "The Big Showdown")
- Cass Van Wyck as Julie (in "Part of the Family")
- Michael Cera as Butch (in "Big Bullies")
- George Buza as Gus the Garbage Truck Driver (in "Going Bananas")
- Jeff Pustil as Seymour Polutski (in "Closing Up Shop")
- Shadia Simmons
- Michael Seater

=== Puppet voices ===
- Frank Meschkuleit
- Matt Ficner
- James Rankin

== Voice cast ==
=== Original (UK) ===
- Susan Sheridan as Noddy, Tessie Bear, Dinah Doll, Sly, Clockwork Mouse, Miss Pink Cat, Martha Monkey, Mrs. Tubby Bear, Mrs. Noah and Lady Giraffe
- Jimmy Hibbert as the Narrator, Big Ears, Master Tubby Bear, Mr. Plod, Bumpy Dog, Noddy's Car, Gobbo, Sammy Sailor, Mr. Sparks, Mr. Straw, Mr. Wobbly Man, Mr. Milko, Mr. Noah, Mr. Train Driver, Mr. Jumbo, Bunkey, Father Christmas (Santa) and Lord Giraffe

=== US Dub ===
- Katie Boland as the Narrator
- Catherine Disher as Noddy, Sly and Master Tubby Bear
- Karen Bernstein as Tessie Bear
- Benedict Campbell as Big Ears, Mr. Plod, Clockwork Clown and Mr. Tubby Bear
- Sharon Lee Williams as Dinah Doll
- James Rankin as Gobbo
- Michael Stark as Mr. Wobbly Man, Clockwork Mouse, Mr. Sparks, Mr. Jumbo, Mr. Train Driver, Mr. Milko, Sammy Sailor, Mr. Noah and Mr. Straw
- Lynne Griffin as Miss Pink Cat and Martha Monkey
- Fiona Reid as Mrs. Tubby Bear and Mrs. Noah

== Puppeteers ==
- Matt Ficner
- Frank Meschkuleit
- James Rankin
- Noreen Young

== Episodes ==
=== Season 1 (1998) ===
No.	Title	Noddy Episode	Puppet Song	Fairytale Song	Writer	Director	Plot
1	The Magic Key	Noddy and the Special Key (Series 1)	The Day the Goblins Got Away; A What-If World		Brian McConnachie	Wayne Moss	Kate, D.J. and Truman enter the Noddy Shop for the first time. They find a magic key that unlocks two boxes. That act releases the Goblins from one box. The other box contains all the toys that make up the Noddy stories.
2	Monkey Business	Noddy's New Friend (UK)/Noddy Makes a New Friend (US) (Series 1)	Too Much Monkey Business		Sean Kelly	Steve Wright	The kids learn that not everything is what it seems when a clown visits the shop.
3	Mixed Up Magic	Noddy and Martha Monkey (Series 1)	A Whole Lot of Helping	One Good Turn (The Elephant and the Mouse)	Kate Barris	Steve Wright	When the shop has a sale and the toys worry that they will be sold, they plan to sabotage it.
4	Lost and Found	Noddy Tastes Some Cake (Series 3)	Lost and Found	Bo Peep and the Sheep	Kate Barris	Wayne Moss	Truman gets lost while playing hide and seek.
5	Twinkle, Twinkle, Little Goblins	Noddy and the Goblins (Series 1)	Camping Song	Twinkle, Twinkle	Sean Kelly	Steve Wright	Aunt Agatha has agreed to let the kids have a camp-out in the shop's back garden, but they are ill-prepared. The toys hold their own camping trip, though Planet Pup must overcome his fear of the dark. Noah has to save the day when the camp-out goes wrong.
6	The Tooth Fairy	Noddy and His Money (Series 3)	Tooth Fairy		Brian McConnachie	Wayne Moss	Truman has lost his first tooth, and finds out all about the Tooth Fairy.
7	Stop, Listen and Learn	Noddy Lends a Hand (Series 2)		The Magic Porridge Pot	Jill Golick	Wayne Moss	Noah isn't feeling at all well, but is too afraid of Aunt Agatha's Agony Cure for Aches to ask for help.
8	Making Up is Easy to Do	Noddy and the Naughty Tail (Series 1)	I Like it That Way		Jill Golick	Wayne Moss	Kate accuses D.J. of stealing her rubber and the toys fight over a tambourine.
9	If at First You Don't Succeed...	Noddy Buys a Parasol (Series 3)	Opera Medley	A Better Way	Ellis Weiner	Wayne Moss	It's the annual bike-a-thon, but D.J. doesn't have a bike. With Noah's help, he earns money to buy one. Aunt Agatha decides to serenade the punters with her terrible opera renditions.
10	The Birthday Party	Noddy Delivers Some Parcels (UK)/Noddy Gives a Birthday Party (US) (Series 1)	Party Time		Ellis Weiner	Steve Wright	The kids and Aunt Agatha have a surprise birthday party planned for Noah. As they work behind Noah's back, Truman and Aunt Agatha learn that the thought behind the birthday wish matters most.
11	Telling Tails	Noddy Finds a Furry Tail (UK)/Noddy Gets Blamed (US) (Series 2)	Face the Music	The Lion and the Jackal	Jill Golick	Wayne Moss	An Indian girl named Amita, the daughter of some old friends of Noah's, has come to the shop for the day, but Kate and D.J. resent her.
12	It's About Time	Noddy and His Alarm Clock (Series 3)	Tell the Time	Hickory Dickory Dock	Sean Kelly	Steve Wright	Truman, wanting to be grown-up, agrees to tell Noah when it's 4:00. But he can't tell the time!
13	A Promise is a Promise	Noddy Borrows an Umbrella (Series 2)	A Promise is a Promise		Sean Kelly	Wayne Moss	Kate, Truman, D.J. and Aunt Agatha are organizing a play in the shop's back garden. But they forget promises they made to Noah.
14	To the Rescue	Noddy Has a Bad Day (Series 2)	The ABCs of Fire		Brian McConnachie	Wayne Moss	Planet Pup, Sherman and Rusty pretend to be firefighters.
15	Chills and Spills	Noddy Sets a Trap (Series 2)		Chicken Little Blues	Lawrence S. Mirkin	Steve Wright	Truman throws mud around and, in the process, getting Noah's sheets dirty. He tries to hide the sheets, but that invariably gets Truman in deeper trouble. Aunt Agatha finds her plums missing, which starts a rash of missing items.
16	The Big Race	Noddy the Champion (Series 3)	Let's Go Racing	Slow and Steady	Brian McConnachie	Steve Wright	Aunt Agatha's grandson, Itchy, brings his bully friends to the Noddy Shop. Both Grit and Rox want to show up Kate, D.J. and Truman at Sports Day.
17	A Dog's Best Friend	Noddy and the Milkman (Series 1)	Planet Pup's Song		Lawrence S. Mirkin	Steve Wright	The kids find a lost dog. Noah agrees to let them keep it until they find the dog's owner. Truman falls in love with the dog, neglecting Planet Pup - but what will he do if the owner is found?
18	Hooray for the Kids	Noddy Cheers Up Big Ears (Series 2)	My Kind of Friends		Sean Kelly	Steve Wright	The Goblins steal a part from Noah's radio.
19	The Mystery Box	Noddy Borrows Some Trousers (UK)/Noddy Gets in a Mess (US) (Series 3)	What's in the Box?		Brian McConnachie	Wayne Moss	Aunt Agatha has a package for Truman, and it brings intrigue. The Goblins cause trouble with some pots of molasses thanks to Warlow.
20	We All Say Boo!	Noddy and the Magic Night (Series 2)	I'm Not Scared		Brian McConnachie	Wayne Moss	Kate, D.J. and their friends are all dressed up for Halloween, so are the toys. Truman and Aunt Agatha have to find scary costumes at the last minute.
21	Try Something New	Noddy Gets a New Job (Series 1)		Jack and Jill	Lawrence S. Mirkin	Steve Wright	Noah asks Kate to run the shop. Truman takes his own new paces as he learns to ride a bike.
22	The Fish Story	Noddy and the Fishing Rod (Series 3)	I Can Do Better Than You		Jill Golick	Wayne Moss	Kate loses the ruby ring her mother gave her while playing a fishing game with her friends, and Johnny Crawfish has a new fish named George move into his tank.
23	The Big Fight	Noddy and His Bell (Series 1)	That's What Friends Do Best		Ellis Weiner	Steve Wright	Noah and Aunt Agatha get into a huge argument when one misunderstanding leads to another. Sherman and Rusty fall out, and so do the Goblins. Can Kate and Truman save the day?
24	Following Directions	Noddy Goes Shopping (Series 2)	Bubble Trouble		Ellis Weiner	Steve Wright	While Noah is down with the flu, Aunt Agatha wants to make changes in the Noddy Shop. How successful those changes are, will be a matter of doing what she says.
25	Mixed Up Masks	Noddy and the Missing Hats (UK)/Noddy Listens and Learns (US) (Series 2)		Coverups	Sean Kelly	Steve Wright	A mischievous boy named Dewey who is the son of some friends of Aunt Agatha's is staying at the shop for the day. He bullies Truman and gets D.J. into trouble.
26	Truman Come Home	Noddy to the Rescue (Series 2)		Gingerbread Man	Kate Barris	Wayne Moss	Truman needs someone to play with on a boring day. With no one to help his cause, idle Truman finds himself doing something wrong.
27	Something's Lost, Something's Found	Noddy Loses Sixpence (UK)/Noddy Loses Some Money (US) (Series 1)	Step by Step		Jill Golick	Wayne Moss	One of the things near and dear to Noah, besides his toys, is the lucky compass he had used as a sailor. Kate and D.J. borrow the compass and subsequently lose it.
28	The Magic Show	Noddy the Magician (Series 3)	Everyday Magic		Brian McConnachie	Steve Wright	D.J. learns magic tricks for the talent show from a man named Jack Fable.
29	The Big Mess	Noddy Meets Some Silly Hens (Series 2)	Another Nice Mess		Ellis Weiner	Steve Wright	Aunt Agatha's remote-operated vacuum cleaner goes berserk when the Goblins steal the remote control. To make matters worse, Warlow lets a parrot loose.
30	Recipe for Learning	Noddy Loses His Bell (Series 2)	The Burrito Song	Peter Piper's Pizza	Ellis Weiner	Steve Wright	When Kate, D.J. and Truman find an old cookbook, they decide to open a Mexican restaurant called the Shipwrecked Inn in the shop's back garden. With Aunt Agatha's help, they attempt to make Mexican burritos - but they don't know anything about Mexican food.
31	Recycle and Reuse It	Noddy and the Useful Rope (Series 2)	Do Something New	Jack Be Nimble	Sean Kelly	Wayne Moss	It's not so much an overflow of rubbish at the Noddy Shop. Rather, the kids find a lot of things with which they use to make marionettes for a marionette show.
32	Telling the Whole Truth	Noddy and the Broken Bicycle (Series 1)		Humpty Dumpty	Lawrence S. Mirkin	Steve Wright	Noah leaves the children in charge of the Noddy Shop. In trying to satisfy Charlene von Pickings, they break her gift - a cuckoo clock.
33	Secret Valentines	Noddy the Dancer (Series 3)		The Princess and the Frog	Kate Barris	Wayne Moss	It's Valentine's Day at the shop. Warlow spitefully steals the toys' Valentine's Day cards - but ends up looking silly when one of them is for him!
34	Sing Yourself to Sleep	Song: Believe in Yourself; Song: The Friend You'll Find in Me	Party Time; Tell the Time; I'm Not Scared; My Kind of Friends; Sleepytime Lullaby	Country Mouse and City Mouse	Rick Siggelkow	Steve Wright	Truman can't get to sleep one night at the Noddy Shop. He believes in all the toys, all of which are ready to perform their usual songs.
35	Treasure Hunt	Noddy and the Golden Tree (Series 3)	Follow the Map		Brian McConnachie	Wayne Moss	A treasure map falls into Truman's hands. This sends all the kids in search of what they think is a great surprise.
36	Jack Frost is Coming to Town	Noddy and the Warm Scarf (Series 3)		Jack Frost is Back in Town	Sean Kelly	Wayne Moss	The Noddy Shop becomes cold inside when Jack Frost escapes from a snow globe and freezes several toys. On this bitter cold day, Aunt Agatha has a scarf ready for Truman, but he doesn't want to wear it.
37	The Trouble with Truman	Noddy and His Unhappy Car (Series 3)	Ready to Rock 'n' Roll		Jill Golick	Steve Wright	Thinking that he's too little, Kate and D.J. won't let Truman look after a rabbit named Snowball. Then Snowball escapes, and it's Truman who is just the right size to rescue her.
38	Let's Go Fly a Kite	Noddy and the Kite (Series 1)	A Crazy Mixed Up Day		Sean Kelly	Steve Wright	Lurk and Snipe use magic to fly a kite, and get whisked away. In his attempts to get them down, Boobull casts a lot of ill-advised spells that turn the Noddy Shop inside-out.
39	Think Big	Noddy and the Pouring Rain (Series 1)	Small	Think Big	Ellis Weiner	Wayne Moss	Kate wants to go on a fantastic adventure. Who knows what will grant her wish?
40	Noah's Leaving	Noddy Has an Afternoon Off (Series 3)	Thank You for Being You		Brian McConnachie	Wayne Moss	Noah considers returning to his old role as a sea captain when Wally the Wanderer arrives at the Noddy Shop.

=== Christmas special (1998) ===
No.	Title	Noddy Episode	Puppet Song	Noddy Song	Writer	Director	Prod. Code	Plot
41	Anything Can Happen at Christmas	Noddy and Father Christmas	Anything Can Happen at Christmas; We Wish You a Merry Christmas	Santa, King of Toyland; Christmas Never Ends	Brian McConnachie	Wayne Moss	#141K	Noah, Aunt Agatha and the other adults are so preoccupied with plans for Christmas that they've turned the holiday into a chore. Truman decides to escape the chaos by playing outside and runs into Annabelle. Annabelle has come to the Noddy Shop to check up on her favourite toys, especially Warlow. Annabelle's presence affects the adults and they remember that Christmas is a time to bring family and friends together.

=== Season 2 (1999) ===
No.	No. in Season	Title	Noddy Episode	Puppet Song	Fairytale Song	Writer	Director	Prod. Code	Plot
42	1	Little Swap of Horrors	Noddy and the Naughty Tail (Series 1) (repeat)	Give Away; To the Rescue		Ellis Weiner	Wayne Moss	#201	Truman trades Planet Pup for a toy aeroplane.
43	2	Dance to Your Own Music	Noddy the Dancer (Series 3) (repeat)	Dance, Dance, Dance		Lawrence S. Mirkin	Wayne Moss	#202	Noah has been taking dance lessons for an upcoming dance contest. Aunt Agatha, organizing the dance, has not practiced.
44	3	Ask Permission	Noddy Sets a Trap (Series 2) (repeat)	Friendship Is	Ask Permission	Kate Barris	Steve Wright	#203	Truman's new friend Sam takes a small mermaid belonging to Noah.
45	4	Take a Stand	Noddy Tastes Some Cake (Series 3) (repeat)	Warlow's Cake; Putting it Together		Brian McConnachie	Wayne Moss	#204	Truman and Itchy want to see the antique horns that have just arrived at the Noddy Shop. Both need money if they want to use the horns on their bikes. Maybe they can help Kate and D.J., who set up a baked good stand outside the shop.
46	5	The Sandman Cometh	Noddy and the Magic Watch (Series 4)	Where Do You Go in Your Dreams?		Brian McConnachie	Steve Wright	#205	Kate and D.J., in preparation for a sleepover, take a package to the Noddy Shop. That package belongs to the Sandman, and it spells trouble for Truman and, by extension, everyone else.
47	6	Noah's Treasure	Noddy and the Golden Tree (Series 3) (repeat)	The Great Pig Chase; Money Isn't Everything		Jill Golick	Wayne Moss	#206	A call from an old seamate alerts Noah to two gold coins. Noah is told the gold coins are part of an old pirate treasure. Before Noah knows it, a bunch of other interests want in on the gold. Lost in the confusion is the fact that April May had just rescued a stray cat.
48	7	Be True to Who You Are	Noddy's New Friend (UK)/Noddy Makes a New Friend (US) (Series 1) (repeat)	Our Club is Your Club; Be True to Who You Are		Jill Golick	Wayne Moss	#207	When Kate is welcomed into a cool girls' club, she tries to act mature by shunning her old ways.
49	8	All Play and No Work	Noddy to the Rescue (Series 2) (repeat)	Unfinished Business	The Little Red Hen	Lawrence S. Mirkin	Steve Wright	#208	Truman has held off finishing his homework. Worse, he hasn't studied for an impending test.
50	9	April Fools	Noddy and His Money (Series 3) (repeat)	The Laugh's On Me		Ellis Weiner	Steve Wright	#209	It's April Fools Day at the Noddy Shop....
51	10	Lights, Camera, Chaos	Noddy and the Goblins (Series 4)	That's Showbiz		Sean Kelly	Steve Wright	#210	Kate, D.J. and Truman want to make a mystery movie. In preparation for The Case of the Missing Necklace, Kate doesn't know that her necklace, intended as a prop for the movie, has really been stolen by the Goblins.
52	11	How Rude	Noddy the Magician (Series 3) (repeat)	Rude and Crude	The Girl with the Curl	Ellis Weiner	Wayne Moss	#211	Noah says that rudeness is like a spell of bad magic. Given the chance, Warlow reads a spell from the Goblins' book. It sends all the toys in the Noddy Shop on a tear of bad moods.
53	12	Part of the Family	Noddy Cheers Up Big Ears (Series 2) (repeat)	Someone to Be My Friend; Part of the Family		Kate Barris	Steve Wright	#212	Mother's Day is approaching, and the kids prepare Mother's Day cards. They encounter Julie, a foster child who is bitter with all the talk of mothers. But her presence brings to life Angelina, a doll that had been lost in the depths of the stockroom.
54	13	Big Bullies	Noddy and the Goblins (Series 1) (repeat)	Gimme, Gimme, Gimme; What Goes Around		Brian McConnachie	Steve Wright	#213	The kids and toys learn how to deal with a bully when they meet Butch and Disrupto the Robot.
55	14	Paying Attention to Kate	Noddy and the Noisy Drum (Series 4)	Buddy, Can You Spare Some Time?	Hush Little Baby	Kate Barris	Wayne Moss	#214	Kate becomes upset to no end because everyone else is devoted to something or someone else.
56	15	Skunked	Noddy and the Singing Bush (Series 4)	Stinky Boy Blues; It's You		Ellis Weiner	Steve Wright	#215	Lurk and Snipe have fallen prey to the smell of a visiting skunk. Boobull casts a spell to clean up the Goblins, but the smell mysteriously moved on to Truman.
57	16	Thunder and Lightning	Noddy Gets Caught in a Storm (Series 4)	Just Around the Corner	Three Men in a Tub	Jill Golick	Steve Wright	#216	Truman is scared when a thunderstorm occurs.
58	17	Going Bananas	Noddy Tidies Toyland (Series 4)	No Litter Island; Cleaning Machine		Lawrence S. Mirkin	Wayne Moss	#217	Sherman believes cleanliness is next to happiness. He cannot fathom the stink that will be raised over the big mess at the Noddy Shop.
59	18	Slugger	Noddy and the Bouncing Ball (Series 4)	It's How You Play the Game	Take Me Out to the Ball Game	Sean Kelly	Steve Wright	#218	Two Little League baseball players refuse to let Truman and Itchy play with them because they're too small. With Kate and D.J. backing them up, they challenge the Little Leaguers to a game. But the circumstances change when a ball possessed with Goblin magic comes into play.
60	19	Find Your Own Song	Song: You've Got Talent; Song: Follow the Voice	My Own Song		Sean Kelly	Steve Wright	#219	Everyone seems obsessed with doing something for the Robbie MacRhino talent contest. When Lurk and Snipe interfere with Kate's and D.J.'s entries, Boobull feels there is only one way to mend things: grow to human form.
61	20	The Big Showdown	Noddy is Far Too Busy (Series 4)	March of the Toys	The Smallest Show on Earth	Sean Kelly	Steve Wright	#220	Aunt Agatha is determined to get rid of the Goblins in the Noddy Shop, and so she then enlists an exterminator named Rodney Styx for help.
62	21	Growing Lies	Noddy Tells a Story (Series 4)	One Lie Leads to Another		Brian McConnachie	Wayne Moss	#221	Truman had been guilty before of not telling the truth. Now he needs a device for telling that truth. Meanwhile, Aunt Agatha spreads rumors about a common criminal who chews on things called "the Chewer".
63	22	The Human Touch	Noddy and the Artists (Series 4)	Disrupto Returns		Sean Kelly	Wayne Moss	#222	There is a place for technology, and a place for what is considered "old" or "antique," as Noah knows. But Aunt Agatha buys a computer for Noah's office. That drives Kate and D.J. to the computer. When they hook up with Disrupto, he sets out to control the toys.
64	23	Be Patient	Noddy and the Driving Lesson (Series 4)	Have a Little Patience	Johnny Appleseed	Ellis Weiner	Wayne Moss	#223	Aunt Agatha is ready to stage a hat show at the Noddy Shop, but she hasn't tested any of her dance-music-playing hats yet. Kate and D.J. have no luck trying to sell apples that they picked while still green.
65	24	Kate Loves a Parade	Noddy the Nurse (Series 4)	On the Day of the Parade		Kate Barris	Wayne Moss	#224	Kate has been chosen to lead the Littleton Falls parade. In the moments before the parade, though, Kate is afraid of making mistakes.
66	25	Closing Up Shop	Noddy and the Treasure Map (Series 4)	One Goodbye at a Time; One Hello at a Time		Brian McConnachie	Wayne Moss	#225	A lack of consumer traffic prompts Noah to accept a deal to sell the Noddy Shop and clear out all the toys. Seymour Polutski wants to turn the Noddy Shop into a cigar shop.

== Reception ==
In its first season on PBS, the show was seen by an average of 2.5 million viewers per episode, higher than Sesame Street's average during the same year.

=== International success ===
Due to almost instantaneous success in the US and Canada, BBC Worldwide decided to distribute the series overseas. "Anything Can Happen at Christmas" was shown on CBBC in the UK in 1998. The first season of the show later aired there from 1999 to 2000 and was also shown in Australia, Malaysia and several countries in English. This version utilized the original sound-track for the Noddy animations. The live action segments were unaltered. The second season was never reversioned for the UK or Australia but was dubbed for other countries. The series was also dubbed for Poland, Spain, France, Israel, Mexico, Greece and Portugal. A music video involving the character Johnny Crawfish, "Special", was made to promote the overseas airings.

=== Awards ===
Year	Nominee / work	Award	Result
1999	Jayne Eastwood for playing Agatha Flugelschmidt in the episode "The Trouble With Truman"	Gemini Award For Best Performance in a Pre-School Program or Series	Won
1999	Sean McCann for playing Noah Tomten in the episode "The Trouble With Truman"	Gemini Award For Best Performance in a Pre-School Program or Series	Nominated
2000	Juul Haalmeyer for designing Noah Tomten and Agatha Flugelschmidt's costumes	Daytime Emmy Award for Outstanding Achievement in Costume Design/Styling	Won
1999	Jayne Eastwood for playing Agatha Flugelschmidt in the episode "Be Patient"	Gemini Award For Best Performance in a Pre-School Program or Series	Nominated
1999	Sean McCann for playing Noah Tomten in the episode "Slugger"	Gemini Award For Best Performance in a Pre-School Program or Series	Nominated

== VHS/DVD releases ==
Title	Release date	Country	Format	Episodes
Noddy and Friends	4 June 1999	United Kingdom / Australia	VHS	The Magic Key; A Dog's Best Friend; The Big Fight
Noddy's Magic Video	4 October 1999	United Kingdom	VHS	The Magic Show; Telling the Whole Truth; Making Up is Easy to Do
Noddy in Toyland	29 October 1999	United Kingdom, Portugal	DVD	The Big Mess; Stop, Listen and Learn; The Trouble with Truman
