= Blue Ash (band) =

American power pop band

- Origin: Ohio
- Genres: Power pop
- Years active: 1969–1979; 2003–2009; 2016
- Labels: Mercury; Playboy; Not Lame
- Past members: Frank Secich; Jim Kendzor; Bill Bartolin; David Evans; Bill Yendrek; George Grexa; Jeff Rozniata; Brian Wingrove; Bobby Tocco; Max Schang; Bobby Darke

Blue Ash was an American band, formed in Ohio in 1969 by bassist Frank Secich and vocalist Jim Kendzor. Guitarist Bill Yendrek and drummer David Evans were recruited later that year.

The band debuted at "The Freak Out", a club in Youngstown, Ohio, on October 3, 1969. In June 1972, Blue Ash signed a production contract with Peppermint Productions of Youngstown and started recording and sending out demos. In late 1972, they were signed to Mercury Records by A&R man Paul Nelson. Their first album No More, No Less was released in May 1973, Blue Ash toured and opened for such acts as the Stooges, Bob Seger, Aerosmith, Ted Nugent though for lack of sales they were dropped by Mercury Records in May 1974.

Blue Ash continued to play live and record, adding drummer Jeff Rozniata who replaced David Evans in 1974. They were signed to a singles deal with Playboy Records in 1977. The first single, "Look At You Now" became a regional hit in Texas, Oklahoma, Louisiana and Mississippi, Ohio and Pennsylvania. Playboy then offered an album deal. The LP Front Page News was recorded in Los Angeles in August 1977 and released in October of that year. In early 1978 Playboy International discontinued Playboy Records and Blue Ash was once again without a label. They disbanded in 1979.

In the summer of 2003 original members Frank Secich, David Evans, Bill Bartolin and Jim Kendzor met privately in Ohio to play and decided to reform the band. On November 8 they played the International Pop Overthrow at the Khyber Pass in Philadelphia. For their "reunion" gigs from 2003–2009, Frank Secich moved from bass guitar to rhythm guitar, and former members Brian Wingrove (piano) and Jeff Rozniata (drums) completed the band along with Bobby Darke (bass). On October 3, 2009, guitarist Bill "Cupid" Bartolin died from complications of cancer, thus bringing another end to the band. Frank Secich went on to join the band Deadbeat Poets, who released three albums between 2007 and 2011.

In 2016, Frank Secich and Jim Kendzor began performing again as Blue Ash, backed by Secich's band Deadbeat Poets. Sometimes jocularly referred to as Half Ash, this configuration toured Spain in June 2016. Secich, Kendzor and Deadbeat Poets member Pete Drivere have also performed several acoustic shows.

== Discography ==
=== LPs & CDs ===
- Blue Ash-No More, No Less-1973 Mercury LP SRM1-666
- Blue Ash- Front Page News-1977 LP PZ 34918 U.S., Venezuela
- Blue Ash-Around Again-2CD(A Collection Of Rarities From The Vault)2004 Not Lame NL 093
- Blue Ash -The Alternate Around Again-2007-Powerpop Lovers
- Blue Ash-No More, No Less-2008 Collectors' Choice CD
- Blue Ash- Hearts & Arrows-2015 2 LP Set- You Are The Cosmos Spain
- Blue Ash-15 Number Ones In A Perfect World-2016 CD- You Are The Cosmos Spain
- Blue Ash-Dinner At Mr. Billy's 2025 LP-CD Peppermint Records

=== Singles & EPs ===
- Blue Ash-Abracadabra (Have You Seen Her?) b/w Dusty Old Fairgrounds 1973
- Blue Ash-I Remember A Time b/w Plain To See 1973
- Blue Ash-Anytime At All b/w She's So Nice 1974
- Blue Ash-Look At You Now b/w Singing And Dancing Away 1977
- Blue Ash-You Are All I Need b/w Jazel Jane 1977
- Blue Ash-4 song 7-inch EP-You Are The Cosmos 2014 Spain
- Blue Ash-Abracadabra (Have You Seen Her?) b/w Hippy, Hippy Shake-Get Hip Records Archive Series 7-inch vinyl 2016

== See also ==
- Music of Ohio
