= Matt Ficner =

Canadian actor, puppeteer, and entrepreneur

- Born: 1973 (age 52–53); Ottawa, Ontario, Canada
- Occupations: Film actor Television actor Puppeteer; Entrepreneur
- Known for: Puppet design
- Parent(s): Debbie Ficner (mother); John Ficner (Father)

Matt Ficner (born 1973) is a Canadian actor, puppeteer, and entrepreneur. For over two decades, Matt has been involved in television, film and theatre projects. As president of Matt Ficner Productions Inc., he received a Top Forty Under 40 award from the Ottawa Business Journal in 2006 in recognition of entrepreneurial success.

He worked with the puppets on the movie Mr. Magorium's Wonder Emporium and has worked on multiple kids shows like Caillou and Ace Lightning. On Ace Lightning, Ficner designed the computer-generated characters for the series, and also provided the voices of the characters Zip and Snip in the first season. In 2008, Boingboing.net featured one of Mr. Ficner's Creepy Puppet shorts called Dusty Zombies. In 2009 he acted and did puppetry on the webseries Spellfury. He created the character of Dennis the raccoon for the Canadian television series Wingin' It.

== Filmography ==
=== As actor ===
- Caillou (1998) as Teddy
- Noddy as Rusty, Lichtenstein and Whiny
- Brats of the Lost Nebula (1998)
- Ace Lightning (2002) as Snip
- The Creepy Puppet Project (2004) as Doc. Whotnaught
- Spellfury (6 episodes, 2008–2009) as Tarek
- Wingin' It (13 episodes, 2010) as Dennis
- "Fernsby's Cryptid Critter Control " (2022) as Joe Fernsby

=== As puppeteer ===
- Ace Lightning (26 episodes, 2002) (as character designer)
- Wilbur (26 episodes, 2006)
- Planet Bizzaro: The World According to Zoomer (26 episodes, 2006–2007)
- Mr. Magorium's Wonder Emporium (2007)
- The Thing (2011)
- "Fernsby's Cryptid Critter Control " (8 episodes, 2022)

=== As writer, producer, director ===
- The Creepy Puppet Project (2004)
- "Fernsby's Cryptid Critter Control " (2022–present)
