= Molly Johnson =

Canadian singer (born 1959)

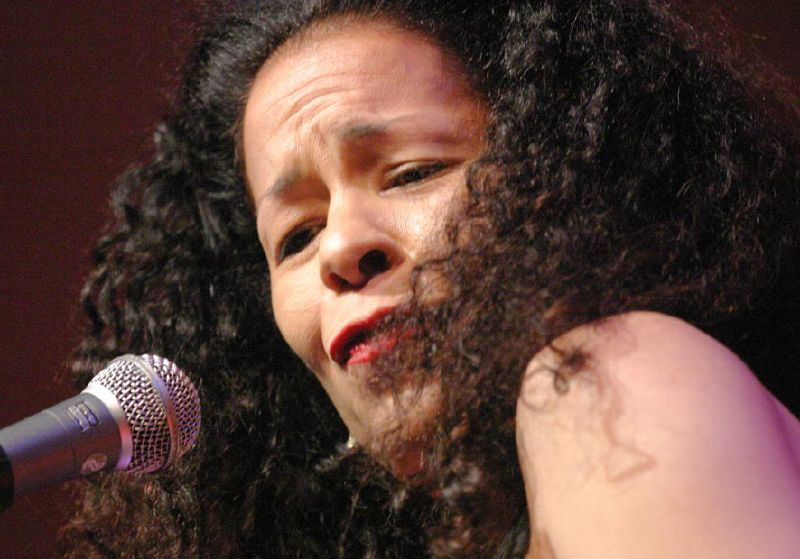
- Johnson performing in 2008

Background information
- Born: Margaret Leslie Johnson; April 14, 1959 (age 67); Toronto, Ontario, Canada
- Genres: Jazz, rock, pop
- Occupations: Singer, songwriter
- Years active: 1979–present
- Website: www.mollyjohnson.com

Margaret Leslie "Molly" Johnson (born April 14, 1959), OC is a Canadian singer of pop and jazz.

== Biography ==
Johnson began as a child performer, receiving formal training from the National Ballet School and the Banff School of Fine Arts. Johnson's brother Clark Johnson, an actor and director (Homicide: Life on the Street, The Wire), and sister Taborah Johnson, an actor and singer, are also noted Canadian performers.

Raised in Toronto, Ontario, as the mixed-race child of a white American mother and a black Trinidadian father, Johnson started her career in the mid-1960s when, as a young grade schooler, she and her brother were tapped by Toronto producer Ed Mirvish to appear in Porgy and Bess at the Royal Alexandra Theatre. In time Porgy and Bess was followed by South Pacific, Finian's Rainbow and other musicals. The budding child star was soon enrolled the National Ballet School as she desired to become a choreographer. By the age of 17, Johnson was fronting a disco band dubbed "A Chocolate Affair". The group lasted just over a year.

She was lead vocalist for two rock bands, Alta Moda in the 1980s and Infidels in the 1990s. Both of her bands had notable singles in Canada (Alta Moda's "Julian" and Infidels' "100 Watt Bulb" and "Celebrate"), but both bands broke up after just one album each.

Also in 1980s, she performed as a backing vocalist with Toronto-based group Breeding Ground, most notably on their singles "Happy Now I Know" and "Ceremony of Love", both of which received consistent college radio airplay, and had rotation on MuchMusic. She also performed with them live whenever her commitments with Alta Moda weren't in conflict. In 1989, she performed the song "The Best We Both Can Be" for the animated film Babar: The Movie, and also provided voice work for Babar and the Adventures of Badou in 2010.

Beginning in 1993, Johnson established an annual concert series, the Kumbaya Festival as a benefit for Canadian charities working around HIV and AIDS. She helped to raise over $1 million for people living with AIDS/HIV.

Although she has performed as a jazz singer throughout her career, beginning with Aaron Davis and David Piltch in the band Blue Monday and then with a band of backing musicians who would later become prominent in their own right as Big Sugar, she did not release a jazz album until her self-titled solo debut in 2000. She followed up with Another Day (2003). Both albums were well received at home and went on to be successful in France, where she continues to tour. In 2006 she released her third solo album Messin' Around.

Johnson became the first Canadian female vocalist in the Toronto Downtown Jazz Festival's 17-year history to sell out a show on the mainstage. She has performed aboard the Royal Yacht Britannia before the Prince Charles and Princess Diana, and has performed for Nelson Mandela and Quincy Jones. She has been the subject of various media feature stories, including Adrienne Clarkson Presents, June Callwood's National Treasures, and Bravo!'s Live at the Rehearsal Hall.

In 2007, she was made an Officer of the Order of Canada. On March 8, 2023, the French government bestowed upon her the Chevalier dans l'Ordre des Arts et des Lettres on the occasion of International Women's Day during a ceremony presided by French Ambassador to Canada, Michel Miraillet and hosted by Tudor Alexis, Consul General of France in Toronto.

Johnson was the weekend host of CBC Radio 2's Radio 2 Morning from September 2008 until December 2013.

On November 11, 2008, Johnson released her fourth full-length album, a record of standards entitled Lucky, via Universal Music Canada and Universal Music France. In March 2009 Lucky took home the Juno Award for Vocal Jazz Album of the Year.

She is currently working on The Black History Project: Canada - an initiative she has started to update Canadian history to include its impact and involvement with regards to Black Canadian history and the Underground Railroad.

== Discography ==
- Molly (Oasis Entertainment, 1999)
- Another Day (Marquis, 2002)
- Messin' Around (Anthem and Universal Canada, 2006), re-released as If You Know Love (Verve, 2007)
- Lucky (Verve and Universal Canada, 2008)
- The Molly Johnson Songbook (Universal Canada and A440 Entertainment, 2011), compilation
- Because of Billie (Universal Canada, 2014)
- Meaning to Tell Ya (Belle Productions, 2018)
- This Holiday Season (Universal Music Canada, 2020)- EP, Holiday album
- It's a Snow Globe World (Universal Music Canada, 2021), Holiday album (including re-release of This Holiday Season EP
