= Adam Bomb =

Adam Bomb may refer to:

- Adam Bomb (musician) (born 1963), American guitarist and singer
- Adam Bomb (wrestler), ring name of Bryan Clark (born 1964)
- Adam Bomb, internet comic strip character created by Andy Fish and Tony Antetomaso
- Adam Bomb, Garbage Pail Kids trading card
