= Infidels (band) =

Canadian musical group

- Origin: Toronto, Ontario, Canada
- Genres: funk rock
- Years active: 1990-1995
- Label: IRS Records
- Spinoff of: Alta Moda
- Past members: Molly Johnson; Norman Orenstein; Washington Savage; Jeff Jones; Owen Tennyson

Infidels were a Canadian funk rock band in the 1990s. The band won a Juno Award as Most Promising Group in 1992.

== History ==
The band formed in 1990 when Molly Johnson reunited with Norman Orenstein, her partner in the short-lived 1980s band Alta Moda. The duo originally wrote a number of songs that they planned to offer to Candi and the Backbeat, and sent them to the Canadian division of IRS Records, Candi's label. IRS president Paul Orescan, who had heard their work as Alta Moda, offered instead to sign them to record a new album. Considering Alta Moda to be a finished project, Johnson chose the new name as a tribute to the Bob Dylan album Infidels. They added Washington Savage, Jeff Jones and Owen Tennyson to the lineup, and released a self-titled album in 1991.

The single "100 Watt Bulb" peaked at #25 in the RPM charts the week of November 23, 1991, "Celebrate" peaked at #12 the week of February 22, 1992, "Without Love" peaked at #30 in the RPM charts the week of June 6, 1992 and "Shaking" peaked at #68 in the RPM charts the week of September 12, 1992. Despite the chart success of "100 Watt Bulb" and "Celebrate", however, the album was only a modest seller, peaking at #74 in RPM's albums chart the week of February 29, 1992.

The band won the award for Most Promising Group of the Year at the Juno Awards of 1992. Later the same year, Johnson and Orenstein collaborated with Meryn Cadell on the non-album single "Courage", a song about the environment. Written for the National Round Table on the Environment and the Economy, the song was released on a split single with The Razorbacks' "Land for Dreams" and its video was filmed at the Canadian Museum of Civilization.

The band recorded a second album in 1995, but were faced with label difficulties. The label wanted them to change their name because there was another band of the same name from Youngstown, Ohio, but Johnson and Orenstein resisted, since they were already well-associated with that name in Canada. As well, the label was going through financial difficulties at the time. As a result, Johnson decided to dissolve the band, and the 1995 album has never been released.

Johnson now performs as a jazz singer. Savage went on to form the band Blaxäm with Tuku and Saidah Talibah Matthews.
