= Bill Draut =

American comic book artist

- Born: Bill Draut; August 14, 1921
- Died: March 3, 1993 (aged 71)
- Areas: Penciller, Inker
- Notable works: Abel; Phantom Stranger

Bill Draut (August 14, 1921–March 3, 1993) was an American comic book artist best known for his work at Harvey Comics and DC Comics from the 1940s to the 1970s.

== Biography ==
Bill Draut began his career as an artist in the 1940s by drawing the "Sergeant Stony Craig" comic strip for the Bell Syndicate. After service in the United States Marine Corps during World War II, he then moved into the comic book industry with his earliest confirmed credit appearing in Harvey Comics' Stuntman Comics #1 (April–May 1946). He worked with Joe Simon and Jack Kirby at Crestwood Publications.

In 1956, Draut began drawing romance stories for DC Comics. He later did extensive work on that publisher's mystery titles including House of Mystery, House of Secrets, The Unexpected, and Weird War Tales. In 1966, Draut co-created Bee-Man with writer Otto Binder for Harvey Comics' Double-Dare Adventures. Draut drew Teen Titans #18 (Nov.–Dec. 1968) which was writer Marv Wolfman's first Teen Titans story and introduced the character originally called Starfire and later renamed Red Star. Draut inked the revival of the Phantom Stranger in Showcase #80 (Feb. 1969) and then drew the first four issues of the Phantom Stranger ongoing series. He and Mark Hanerfeld created Abel in DC Special #4 (July–Sept. 1969) and the character soon became the "host" of the House of Secrets series. Draut was to have drawn the first appearance of Marvel Comics' Scarecrow character but did not complete the assignment. He was a character designer on the G.I. Joe: A Real American Hero animated series for Sunbow Entertainment. Draut's final published work in comics was inking Steve Ditko's pencilled artwork in the story "Who Is The Monster?" in The Fly #3 (Oct. 1983).

== Bibliography ==
=== Archie Comics ===
- Adventures of the Fly #1 (1959)
- The Fly #3 (1983)

=== Charlton Comics ===
- Cody of the Pony Express #8 (1955)
- Crazy, Man, Crazy #v2#2 (1956)
- Fox Hole #5–6 (1955)
- From Here to Insanity #11 (1955)
- In Love #6 (1955)
- Police Trap #5 (1955)

=== Crestwood Publications/Prize Comics ===
- All for Love #1 (1957)
- Black Magic #1–4, 6–7, 9, 12–15, 17, 20–24, 32 (1950–1954)
- Headline Comics #27–31, 74–77 (1947–1956)
- Strange World of Your Dreams #1, 3 (1952)
- Young Brides #1 (1952)
- Young Love #1 (1949)
- Young Romance #1 (1947)

=== DC Comics ===
- DC Special #4 (13 Shock-Ending Stories) (1969)
- DC Special Series #12 (Secrets of Haunted House Special) (1978)
- Falling in Love #8, 10–11, 17, 25–26, 29, 31, 33, 37–38, 48–50, 52–54, 65, 67, 82–83 (1956–1966)
- The Flash #237 (Green Lantern backup story) (1975)
- Forbidden Tales of Dark Mansion #7, 12 (1972–1973)
- Ghosts #62, 71, 75–76, 78, 83 (1978–1979)
- G.I. Combat #213 (1979)
- Girls' Love Stories #49, 51, 59, 64, 66, 69, 73, 79, 83, 86, 89, 91, 98, 100, 122, 142, 147, 149–150, 154, 156–157, 162 (1957–1971)
- Girls' Romances #44, 48, 53, 60, 64–67, 69, 71, 74, 81, 85–87, 90, 95 (1957–1963)
- Heart Throbs #47 (1957)
- House of Mystery #177, 191, 193, 251–255, 257, 265, 273 (1968–1979)
- House of Secrets #81, 83, 86, 88, 92, 96, 127–128, 133, 139, 141–143, 146–147, 149 (1969–1978)
- Kong the Untamed #5 (1976)
- Leave It to Binky #71 (1970)
- Phantom Stranger vol. 2 #1–4, 32 (1969–1974)
- Plop! #3, 6, 15, 19 (1974–1976)
- Secret Hearts #38, 40, 45–46, 56, 58, 104, 145 (1957–1970)
- Secrets of Haunted House #2, 5 (1975–1976)
- Secrets of Sinister House #6, 14 (1972–1973)
- Sgt. Rock #305 (1977)
- Showcase #80 (Phantom Stranger); #104 (O.S.S. Spies at War) (1969–1978)
- Star Spangled War Stories #195 (1976)
- Superboy starring the Legion of Super-Heroes #213–215 (1975–1976)
- The Superman Family #184 (1977)
- Super-Team Family #2, 12 (1975–1977)
- Tales of Ghost Castle #3 (1975)
- Tales of the Unexpected #2 (1956)
- Teen Titans #18 (1968)
- The Unexpected #109–111, 140, 146, 162, 189, 190 (1968–1979)
- Unknown Soldier #217 (1978)
- Weird Mystery Tales #4, 22 (1973–1975)
- Weird War Tales #30–32, 36, 39–40, 43, 48–49, 51, 55–58, 69 (1974–1978)
- Weird Western Tales #15, 36 (1972–1976)
- Welcome Back, Kotter #6–7 (1977)
- The Witching Hour #7, 83 (1970–1978)
- Young Love #125–126 (1977)
- Young Romance #125, 156 (1963–1968)

=== Marvel Comics ===
- Journey into Mystery #40 (1956)
- Spellbound #29 (1956)
- Strange Stories of Suspense #11 (1956)
- Western Outlaws #16 (1956)

Preceded by n/a	Phantom Stranger vol. 2 artist 1969	Succeeded by Mike Sekowsky
Preceded by Mike Grell	Superboy and the Legion of Super-Heroes inker 1975–1976	Succeeded by Mike Grell
