= Heart Throbs =

American romance comic book series

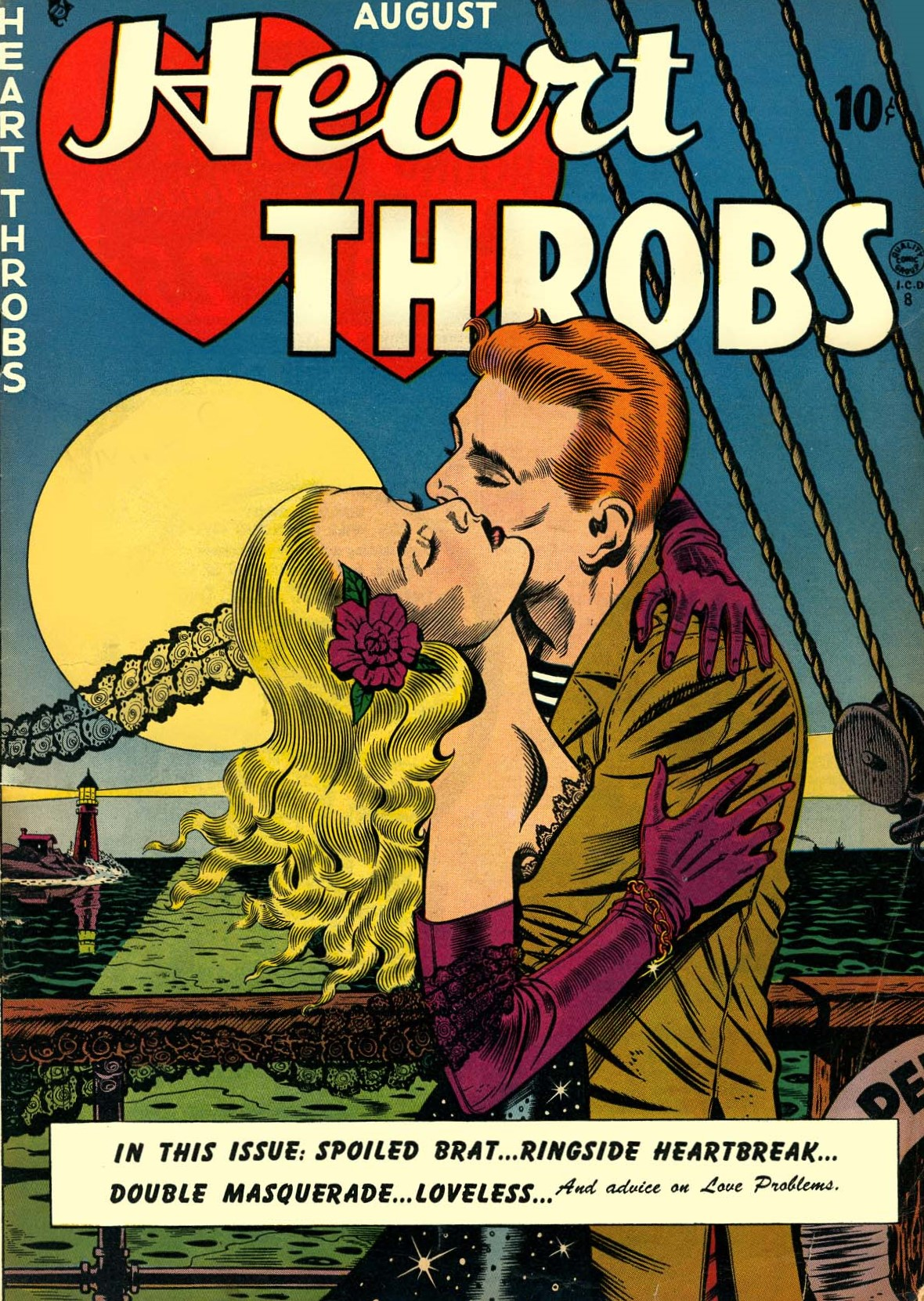
- Heart Throbs #1 (Aug. 1949) by Bill Ward.

Publication information
- Publisher: Quality Comics; DC Comics
- Schedule: varied: Bimonthly and 8x/year
- Format: Ongoing series
- Genre: Romance
- Publication date: Aug. 1949 – Oct. 1972
- No. of issues: 146

Creative team
- Written by: Bob Kanigher, Barbara Friedlander
- Artist(s): Jay Criton, Gene Colan, Ogden Whitney, Mort Drucker, John Romita, Sr., Win Mortimer, John Rosenberger
- Penciller(s): John Forte, Jay Scott Pike
- Inker(s): Vince Colletta, Bernard Sachs, Gene Colan, Russ Jones, Tony DeZuniga
- Letterer(s): Ira Schnapp, Gaspar Saladino
- Editor(s): Whitney Ellsworth, Phyllis Reed, L.M. Nadle, Jack Miller, Barbara Friedlander, Joe Orlando, Dorothy Woolfolk

Collected editions
- Heart Throbs: The Best of DC Romance Comics: ISBN 0671252364

Heart Throbs was a romance comic published by Quality Comics and DC Comics from 1949 to 1972. Quality published the book from 1949–1957, when it was acquired by DC. Most issues featured a number of short comics stories, as well advice columns, text pieces, and filler. The long-running feature "3 Girls—Their Lives—Their Loves", drawn by Jay Scott Pike and inked by Russ Jones, ran in Heart Throbs from 1966–1970.

In addition to Pike and Jones, regular contributors to Heart Throbs during its run included Bob Kanigher, Barbara Friedlander, Jay Criton, Gene Colan, John Romita, Sr., John Forte, Vince Colletta, Bernard Sachs, Win Mortimer, John Rosenberger, and Tony DeZuniga.

== Publication history ==
Quality Comics published 46 issues of Heart Throbs from Aug. 1949–Dec. 1956. Many early issues featured photographic covers. The company closed in 1956, selling most of its assets to National Periodical Publications (now known as DC Comics).

With its acquisition of Heart Throbs, DC continued its numbering, the first issue being #47 (Apr./May 1957). The company published 100 issues of Hearth Throbs, until #146 (Oct. 1972).

With issue #147 (Nov. 1972), DC changed the title of the book to Love Stories, publishing six more issues before cancelling the comic for good with issue #152 (Oct./Nov. 1973).

=== Collected editions ===
In 1979, Fireside Books published Heart Throbs: The Best of DC Romance Comics, which featured many stories from the pages of Heart Throbs.

== Recurring features ==
Starting with its first issue as publisher, DC ran the regular text feature "It Happened in Hollywood" in Heart Throbs until the early 1960s.

Starting with issue #102 (June/July 1966), Heart Throbs began the long-running serial "3 Girls—Their Lives—Their Loves". It ran 22 episodes before concluding in issue #123 (Dec. 1969/Jan. 1970).

=== Advice columns ===
During the Quality Comics period, Hearth Throbs featured Marilyn Minton's "Advice on Love Problems".

The advice column "Telling It the Way It Is... to Lynn Farrell" began running in 1969. The column was retitled "Like It Is!" (with advice dispensed by "Donna Fayne") in 1972, near the end of the book's run.

== Contributors ==
Notable creators who worked on the title for Quality Comics included Jay Criton, who worked on the title from 1954–56, and Gene Colan, who did spot stories in the 1950s. Ogden Whitney also contributed artwork to the book during this period. Penciler John Forte worked on the title for periods under both publishers.

For a while Mort Drucker supplied illustrations for regular one-page fillers after the title's acquisition by DC. Colan returned as an inker in the DC period, working on the title from 1963–1967. Vince Colletta inked Heart Throbs stories at different times throughout the period 1958–1972. Bernard Sachs inked many covers and stories through the DC period, being particularly active up through 1969.

John Romita Sr. (who was cover artist for many of DC's romance titles) drew most of the covers from 1960–1963. Bob Kanigher wrote many stories during the later half of the 1960s.

In addition to his work on "3 Girls", Pike drew the majority of the book's covers from 1967–1972. Win Mortimer and John Rosenberger were regular contributors during the same period. Tony DeZuniga inked the book in 1971–1972.

Under the auspices of DC, Heart Throbs' initial editor was Whitney Ellsworth. Phyllis Reed took over as editor in 1959, staying on the book until 1963. Larry "L.M." Nadle edited Heart Throbs until his death in December 1963, after which it was taken over by Jack Miller. Barbara Friedlander was the book's editor, as well as one of its lead writers, during the period 1966-1968. Jack Miller returned as editor in 1968, staying until 1969 when he was replaced by Joe Orlando. Dorothy Woolfolk edited the title from 1971 to the end of its run.

== Legacy ==
In the late 1970s, underground cartoonist Larry Fuller created Gay Heart Throbs, a homosexual homage to Heart Throbs. It lasted only a few issues.

The 1987–1991 comic book series Good Girls, created by Carol Lay, satirizes romance comics conventions, particularly those of Heart Throbs.

In 1999, the DC Comics imprint Vertigo published a four-issue limited series titled Heartthrobs, which spoofed Heart Throbs in an R-rated manner. Heartthrobs featured satirical adult-oriented stories by such creators as Brian Azzarello, Frank Quitely, Ilya, Bob Fingerman, and Richard Corben.
