= Run for Love (disambiguation) =

Run for Love may refer to:

- Run for Love (film) (Chinese: Bēn Ài), a 2016 Chinese film
- "Run for Love!", a comic illustrated by Tony Abruzzo which was the base of Roy Lichtenstein's painting Hopeless
- Run For Love, a road race Armonk, New York
- "Run for Love", a 1984 song by Winder
- "Run for Love", a 2007 song by Charlie Dée
- "Run for Love", a 2011 song by Joan as Police Woman from The Deep Field
