= Zena Brody =

American editor

- Born: Zena Carol Friedland; March 10, 1928 New York, U.S.
- Died: June 12, 1971 (aged 43)
- Area: Editor
- Notable works: DC romance comics (Girls' Romances, Girls' Love Stories, Secret Hearts)
- Spouse: Eugene Brody (m. 1951)

Zena Brody (March 10, 1928 – June 12, 1971) worked for DC Comics as an editor for the romance comics line during the golden age of comics. On her appointment in 1949, Brody was the first ever woman comics editor.

== Early life ==
Brody was born to Samuel Friedland and Rebecca Rosen, who were Russian immigrants. She only had one sibling, a sister named Gloria Jean Friedland. Brody attended the University of Michigan, where she gained a Bachelor of Arts degree in English. She married Eugene Brody on June 24, 1951, in New York.

== Career ==
After graduating from the University of Michigan, Brody was hired on by editor-in-chief Irwin Donenfeld to be the first editor of the DC Comics romance line. In 1952, she was editing the titles Secret Hearts, Girls' Romance and Girls' Love Stories. Donenfeld said in an interview that:

The romance magazines really appealed to young girls," he says, "so I felt a woman would have a better handle on what a young girl would like, better than a guy like Bob Kanigher, who was doing war books."

Brody was hired on to launch Girls' Love Stories, which took on traditional themes such as female behavior, gender roles, love, sex, and marriage. She continued on to edit Girls' Romances and Secret Hearts. Zena continued her career until she was succeeded by editors Ruth Brant, Phyllis Reed, and Dorothy Woolfolk.
