= Drowning Girl =

Painting by Roy Lichtenstein (1963)

- Artist: Roy Lichtenstein
- Year: 1963
- Catalogue: 80249
- Medium: oil and synthetic polymer paint on canvas
- Dimensions: 171.6 cm × 169.5 cm (67 5/8 in × 66 3/4 in)
- Location: Museum of Modern Art, New York City
- Accession: 685.1971

Drowning Girl is a 1963 American painting in oil and synthetic polymer paint on canvas by Roy Lichtenstein, based on original art by Tony Abruzzo. The painting is considered among Lichtenstein's most significant works, perhaps on a par with his acclaimed 1963 diptych Whaam!. One of the most representative paintings of the pop art movement, Drowning Girl was acquired by the Museum of Modern Art in 1971.

The painting has been described as a "masterpiece of melodrama", and is one of the artist's earliest images depicting women in tragic situations, a theme to which he often returned in the mid-1960s. It shows a teary-eyed woman on a turbulent sea. She is emotionally distressed, seemingly from a romance. Using the conventions of comic book art, a thought bubble reads: "I Don't Care! I'd Rather Sink — Than Call Brad For Help!" This narrative element highlights the clichéd melodrama, while its graphics — including Ben-Day dots that echo the effect of the printing process — reiterate Lichtenstein's theme of painterly work that imitates mechanized reproduction. The work is derived from a 1962 DC Comics panel; both the graphical and narrative elements of the work are cropped from the source image. It also borrows from Hokusai's The Great Wave off Kanagawa and from elements of modernist artists Jean Arp and Joan Miró. It is one of several Lichtenstein works that mention a character named Brad who is absent from the picture.

== Background ==
During the late 1950s and early 1960s a number of American painters began to adapt the imagery and motifs of comic strips. Roy Lichtenstein made drawings of comic strip characters in 1958. Andy Warhol produced his earliest paintings in the style in 1960. Lichtenstein, unaware of Warhol's work, produced Look Mickey and Popeye in 1961. Although Warhol had produced silkscreens of comic strips and of other pop art subjects, he supposedly relegated himself to Campbell's Soup Cans as a subject at the time to avoid competing with the more finished style of comics by Lichtenstein. He once said "I've got to do something that really will have a lot of impact that will be different enough from Lichtenstein and James Rosenquist, that will be very personal, that won't look like I'm doing exactly what they're doing."

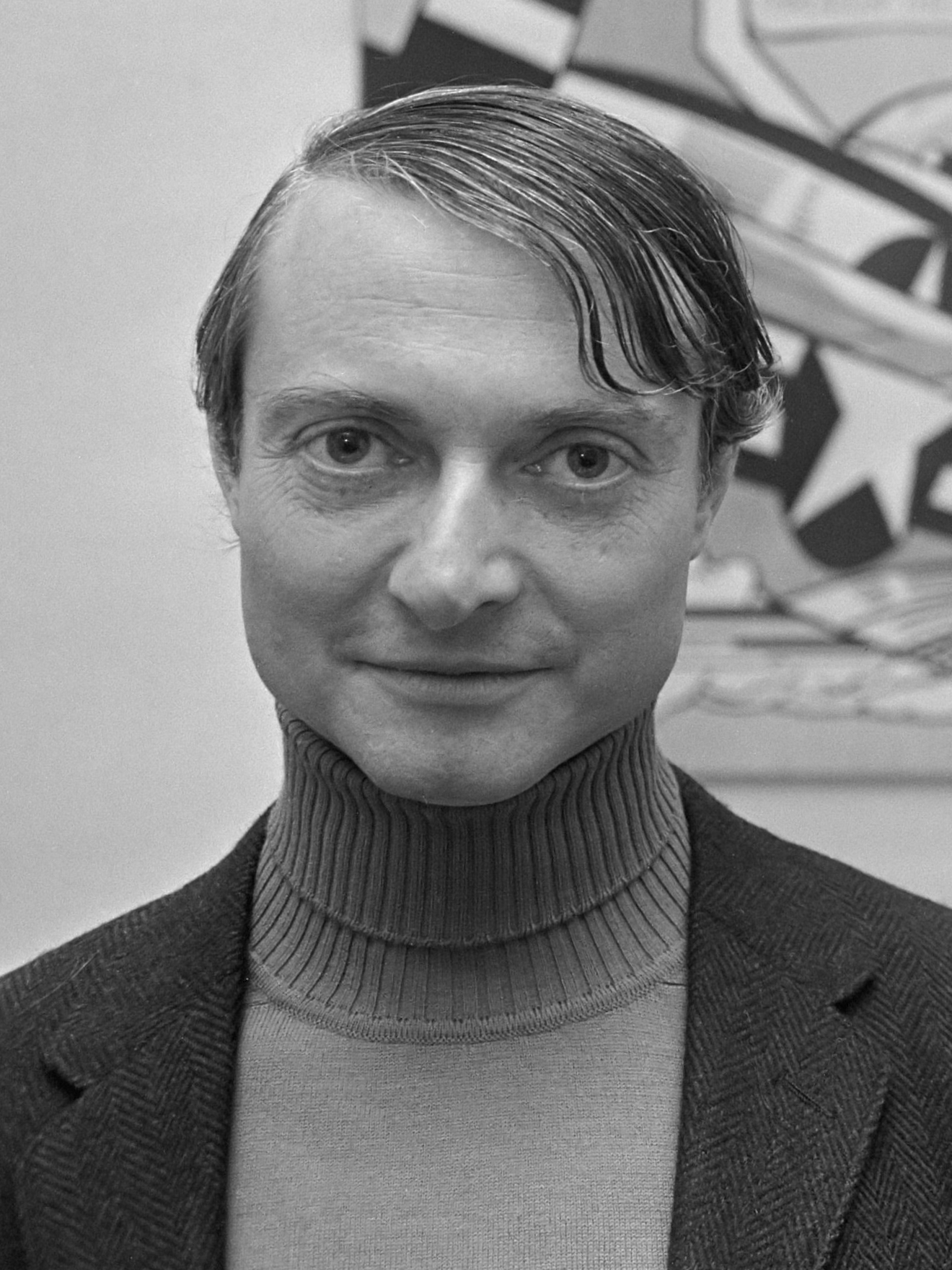
In 1961, Roy Lichtenstein's cartoon work advanced from animated cartoons to more serious themes such as romance and wartime armed forces.

Drowning Girl depicted the advancement of Lichtenstein's cartoon work, which represented his 1961 departure from his abstract expressionism period, from animated cartoons to more serious themes such as romance and wartime armed forces. Lichtenstein said that, at the time, "I was very excited about, and very interested in, the highly emotional content yet detached impersonal handling of love, hate, war, etc., in these cartoon images." Lichtenstein parodied four Picassos between 1962 and 1963. Picasso's depictions of weeping women may have influenced Lichtenstein to produce portrayals of vulnerable teary-eyed women, such as the subjects of Hopeless and Drowning Girl. Another possible influence on his emphasis on depicting distressed women in the early- to mid-1960s was that his first marriage was dissolving at the time. Lichtenstein's first marriage to Isabel Wilson, which resulted in two sons, lasted from 1949 to 1965; the couple separated in 1963.

When Lichtenstein made his transition to comic-based work, he began to mimic the style while adapting the subject matter. He applied simplified color schemes and commercial printing-like techniques. The style he adopted was "simple, well-framed images comprised of solid fields of bold color often bounded by thick, stark border lines." The borrowed technique was "representing tonal variations with patterns of colored circles that imitated the half-tone screens of Ben-Day dots used in newspaper printing". PBS asserts that this is an adaptation of the ligne claire style associated with Hergé. Lichtenstein once said of his technique: "I take a cliche and try to organize its forms to make it monumental."

The subject of Drowning Girl is an example of Lichtenstein's post-1963 comics-based women who "look hard, crisp, brittle, and uniformly modish in appearance, as if they all came out of the same pot of makeup." In the early 1960s, Lichtenstein produced several "fantasy drama" paintings of women in love affairs with domineering men causing women to be miserable, such as Drowning Girl, Hopeless and In the Car. These works served as prelude to 1964 paintings of innocent "girls next door" in a variety of tenuous emotional states. "In Hopeless and Drowning Girl, for example, the heroines appear as victims of unhappy love affairs, with one displaying helplessness ... and the other defiance (she would rather drown than ask for her lover's help)." Drowning Girl, the aforementioned works and Oh, Jeff...I Love You, Too...But... are among those tragedies that make the author a popular draw at museums.

== History ==
Tony Abruzzo's splash page from "Run for Love!" in Secret Hearts no. 83 (November 1962) was the source for Drowning Girl.

Drowning Girl is derived from the splash page from "Run for Love!", illustrated by Tony Abruzzo and lettered by Ira Schnapp, in Secret Hearts #83 (November 1962), DC Comics. This is the same comic book issue that inspired Hopeless.

In 1963, Lichtenstein was parodying various types of sources such as commercial illustrations, comic imagery and even modern masterpieces. The masterpieces represented what could have been dubbed the "canon" of art and was thought of as "high art," while the "low-art" subject matter included comic strip images. His masterworks sources included the likes of Cézanne, Mondrian and Picasso. During this time in his career, Lichtenstein noted that "the things that I have apparently parodied I actually admire." At the time, Lichtenstein was exploring the theme of "industrialization of emotion". In Lichtenstein's obituary, Los Angeles Times critic Christopher Knight said the work was "a witty rejoinder to De Kooning's famously brushy paintings of women". His comic romances often depicted stereotypical representations of thwarted passions. Although the Lichtenstein Foundation website claims that Lichtenstein did not begin using his opaque projector technique until the fall of 1963, Lichtenstein described his process for producing comics based art, including Drowning Girl:

As directly as possible ... From a cartoon, photograph or whatever, I draw a small picture—the size that will fit into my opaque projector ... I don't draw a picture to reproduce it—I do it in order to recompose it ... I project the drawing onto the canvas and pencil it in and then I play around with the drawing until it satisfies me.

— Lichtenstein

When Lichtenstein had his first solo show at the Leo Castelli Gallery in New York City in February 1962, it sold out before the opening. In addition to Drowning Girl, the exhibition included Look Mickey, Engagement Ring, Blam and The Refrigerator. The show ran from February 10 through March 3, 1962. According to the Lichtenstein Foundation website, Drowning Girl was part of Lichtenstein's first exhibition at Ferus Gallery in Los Angeles from April 1 – April 27, 1963, featuring Masterpiece, Portrait of Madame Cézanne and other works from 1962 and 1963. It was also part of his second solo exhibition at the Leo Castelli Gallery from September 28 – October 24, 1963 that included Torpedo...Los!, Baseball Manager, In the Car, Conversation, and Whaam!. Marketing materials for the show included the lithograph Crak! The Museum of Modern Art acquired Drowning Girl in 1971, and their webpage for this work credits Philip Johnson and Mr. and Mrs. Bagley Wright for the acquisition.

== Description ==
Some sources describe the subjects of Lichtenstein's tragic girls series as heroines (in the sense that they are the counterparts to the heroes), and others do not (in the sense that they are not heroic). Drowning Girl is a painting of a female subject who would prefer to give in to the power of the ocean than call for aid. Lichtenstein's version of the scene eliminates everything but the sea and a few body parts of the subject: her head, shoulder and hand, which are barely above the water. As her face is presented her eyes are shut with drops of what appear to be tears flowing from them. Because Lichtenstein only presents a single frame, the viewer does not know what happened before this moment and what is going to happen after it. Furthermore, the viewer has no way to know who Brad is and why she is so reluctant to call him.

According to The Grove Encyclopedia of American Art, the most important element of Lichtenstein's procedure in the early 1960s was "the enlargement and unification of his source material". Although, according to some sources, the changes made to produce Drowning Girl are not regarded as significant, Lichtenstein made several notable changes from the original source: "In the original illustration, the drowning girl's boyfriend appears in the background, clinging to a capsized boat. Lichtenstein cropped the image dramatically, showing the girl alone and encircled by a threatening wave. He changed the caption from 'I don't care if I have a cramp!' to 'I don't care!' and the boyfriend's name from Mal to Brad." With the former narrative change, Lichtenstein removed evidence that the drowning girl has a cramp in her leg. With the latter narrative change, Lichtenstein attempted to change the perception of the boyfriend. When discussing another work (I Know...Brad), Lichtenstein stated that the name Brad sounded heroic to him and was used with the aim of clichéd oversimplification.

Lichtenstein's method entailed "strengthening of the formal aspects of the composition, a stylization of motif, and a 'freezing' of both emotion and actions". Although comic-book panels depict a moment in time, Drowning Girl is borrowed from an example of a comic-book panel depiction of a moment relatively more "pregnant" with past- and future-dependent drama than most moments. This work also marks a phase in Lichtenstein's career when many of his works were given present-participial titles such as Sleeping Girl, Crying Girl and Blonde Waiting, which accentuates the works' "relation to process and action." According to The Grove Encyclopedia of American Art, during this phase of Lichtenstein's career "a constant if restrained and a gentle sense of humor contribute just as much to the cheerful lightness of Lichtenstein's work as the balanced, completely harmonious composition."

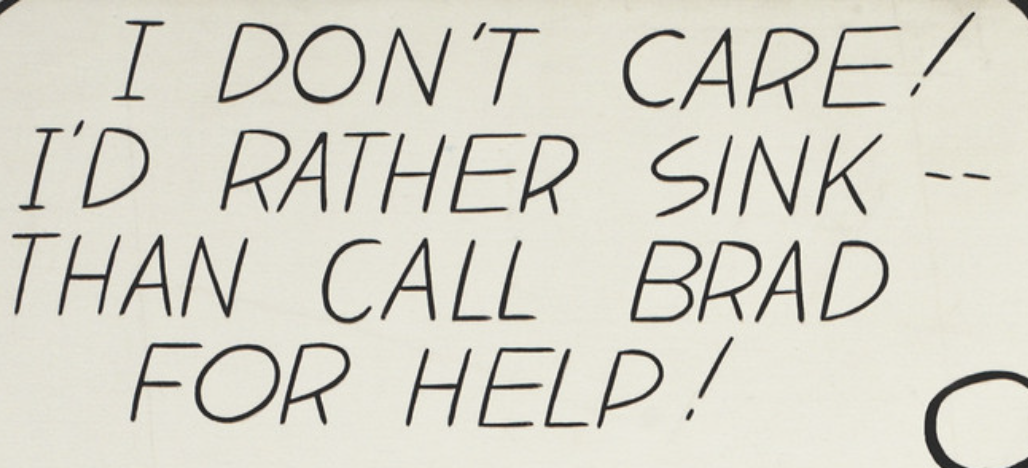
Narrative content of Drowning Girl

Narrative content was in the forefront of much of Lichtenstein's work as a means to engage the viewer. Measuring 171.6 cm × 169.5 cm (67.625 in × 66.75 in), Drowning Girl presents "a young woman who seems to have cried herself a river ... literally drowning in emotion," according to Janis Hendrickson. The melodrama makes it clear that she has been hurt by a "Brad", the name given to several of Lichtenstein's heroes. Vian Shamounki Borchert says that the caption makes it clear that the subject is practically "drowning in a sea of tears".

In typical Lichtenstein fashion, the tragic female is presented "in a suspended state of distress." According to Janis Hendrickson, the subject's head appears to rest on a wave as if it were a pillow and lies in the water as if it were a bed, creating a blend of "eroticism and final resting place". The waters of the sea swirl around the subject's waves of hair creating the perception of a whirlpool. The painting is representative of Lichtenstein's affinity for single-frame drama that reduces the viewer's ability to identify with it and that abstracts emotion. His use of industrial and mechanical appearance further trivialize the sentiments, although the painterly touches add to its simplification.

== General context ==
In the early 1960s Lichtenstein's theme of comics-based work was hotly debated. In a 1963 article in The New York Times, Brian O'Doherty wrote that Lichtenstein's work was not art, saying Lichtenstein was "one of the worst artists in America" who "briskly went about making a sow's ear out of a sow's ear." This was part of a widespread debate about the merits of Lichtenstein's comic blow-ups as true art. In January 1964 Life ran a story under the title "Is He the Worst Artist in the U.S.?" on this controversy. Later reviews were much kinder. Todd Brewster noted that this may have been motivated by popular demand; he told Life in 1986 that "Those cartoon blowups may have disturbed the critics, but collectors, tired of the solemnity of abstract expressionism, were ready for some comic relief. Why couldn't the funny pages be fine art?" His work is now widely accepted, although some criticize him for borrowing from comics without attributing the original creators, paying royalties, or seeking permission from copyright holders. David Barsalou has dedicated decades to identifying all of Lichtenstein's source materials and has posted more than 1,000 images on Flickr detailing Lichtenstein's unrecognized sources.

Some critics question Lichtenstein's artistic skills. Everett Kinstler said that despite Lichtenstein's association with romance comics, in his day "no comics publisher would have hired Lichtenstein—he wasn't good enough." Kinstler said Lichtenstein lacked the ability to portray the emotional range of the story through facial expressions and body language independently.

Art historians Hugo Frey and Jan Baetens note that the Batman comic story Art Gallery of Rogues included a panel that approximately redrew Lichtenstein's Drowning Girl. They discuss this as an example of comic-book artists incorporating imagery associated with Pop Art back into comics.

== Reception ==
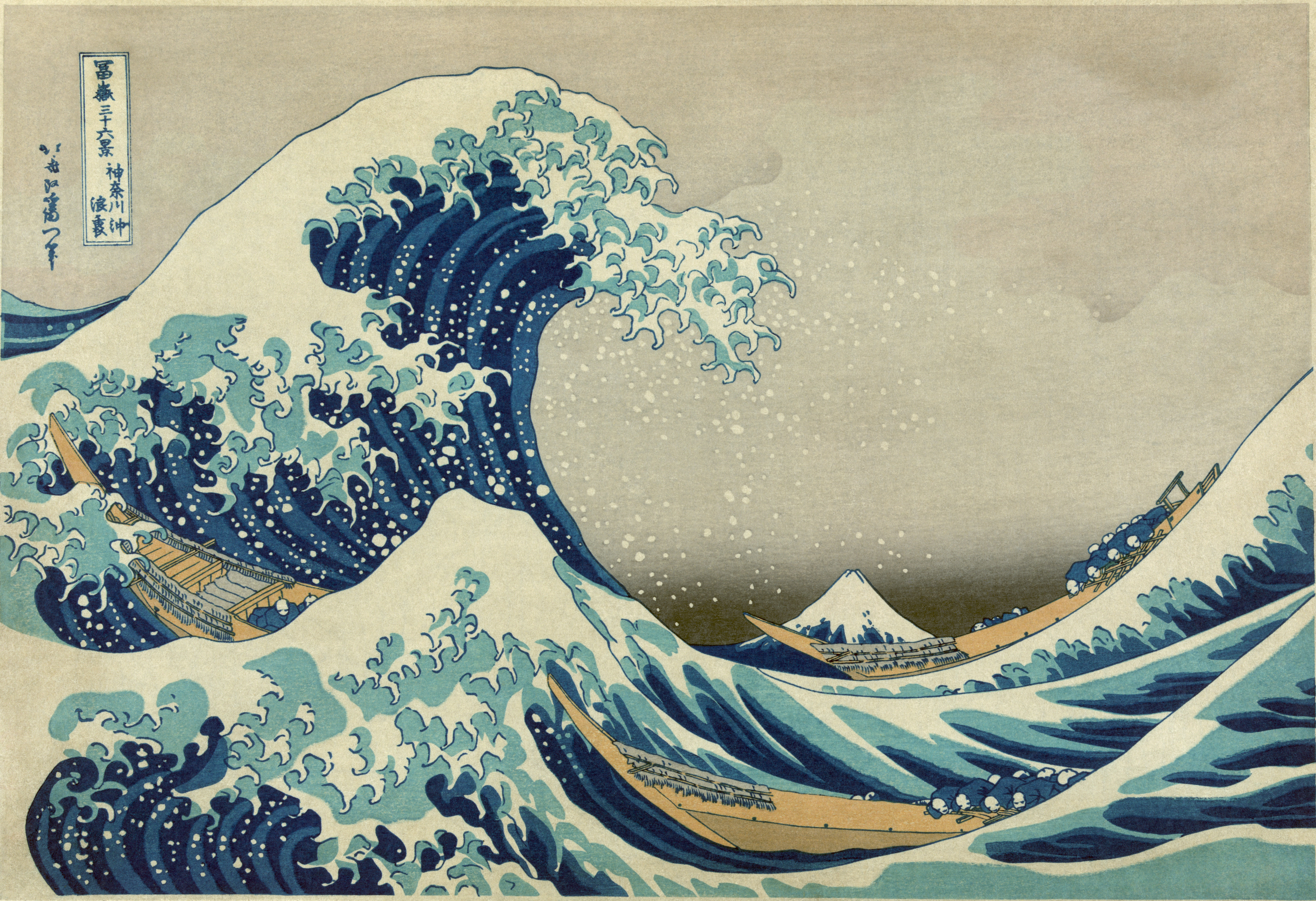
Lichtenstein acknowledges that the wave is adapted from The Great Wave off Kanagawa, the famous woodblock print by Hokusai.

Drowning Girl was painted at the apex of Lichtenstein's use of enlarged dots, cropping, and magnification of the original source. In 1993, Solomon R. Guggenheim Museum curator Diane Waldman noted that Lichtenstein made Drowning Girl a cornerstone of his career because of "his extraordinary sense of organization, his ability to use a sweeping curve and manipulate it into an allover pattern". According to the 2007 edition of The Oxford Dictionary of American Art and Artists, the work is "a mix of cliché, melodrama, pathos, and absurdity ..." In 1995, art scholar Jonathan Fineberg called it "a remarkably impassive style". The image is typical of Lichtenstein's depiction of comic subjects responding to a situation in a clichéd manner.

Lichtenstein's tinkering with the source material resulted in a recomposition with sharper focus after he eliminated several elements that distract from the depiction of the woman, such as the capsized boat, troubled male subject and the general seascape. The result, Lanchner wrote, was swirling, swooping waves and "animate white foam" that envelope the subject with a "pictorial buoyancy" that form an "aquatic continuum".

Drowning Girl presents an "unmistakeable acknowledgement to the flamboyant linearism of Art Nouveau". The waves are intended to "recall Hokusai as well as the biomorphic forms of Arp and Miró;" just as the source comics may have intended to. Lichtenstein has claimed a strong relation between the original comic book source panel and Hokusai's The Great Wave off Kanagawa, making this work a bridge between the two. The adaptation of the wave print is said to add a decorative look and feel to the painting, without which the work might be much more alarming to the viewer. Lichtenstein even made the connection between Drowning Girl's arabesque waves and "the Art Nouveau aesthetic". Regarding this work, Lichtenstein stated:

In the Drowning Girl the water is not only Art Nouveau, but it can also be seen as Hokusai. I don't do it just because it is another reference. Cartooning itself sometimes resembles other periods in art – perhaps unknowingly ... They do things like the little Hokusai waves in the Drowning Girl. But the original wasn't very clear in this regard – why should it be? I saw it and then pushed it a little further until it was a reference that most people will get ... it is a way of crystallizing the style by exaggeration.

Tøjner describes the work as "Lichtenstein's finest formulation of a counter-image to the many explosions in his universe", noting that the drama is past its peak although it may seem to be at a crescendo. He also notes that "the tears are drawn with classic Lichtenstein waxy fullness" despite the surrounding water, which must be significant since "naturalistic justification" is absent. A November 1963 Art Magazine review stated that this was one of the "broad and powerful paintings" of the 1963 exhibition at Castelli's Gallery. Nonetheless, the name of the work was not universally known. In Art Magazine's review of his 1964 Castelli Gallery show, Lichtenstein was referred to as the author of I Don't Care, I'd Rather Sink (Drowning Girl). In 2005, Gary Garrels of the Museum of Modern Art wrote that the work is a "poetics of the utterly banal, of displaced ordinariness" resulting in an "image frozen in time and space", making it "iconic". Comparing this to the source, Garrels says it is a rendering "in a simplified vocabulary" produced while Lichtenstein put aside his mechanical objectivity. According to The Grove Encyclopedia of American Art, extreme examples of his formalization become "virtual abstraction" when the viewer recalls that the motif is an element of a larger work. Thus, Lichtenstein reinforced a non-realist view of comic strips and advertisements, presenting them as artificial images with minimalistic graphic techniques. Lichtenstein's magnification of his source material stressed the plainness of his motifs as an equivalent to mechanical commercial drawing, leading to implications about his statements on modern industrial America. Nonetheless, Lichtenstein appears to have accepted the American capitalist industrial culture.

In 2003, Sarah Rich and Joyce Henri Robinson contrasted Lichtenstein's Ben-Day dots use in Drowning Girl with another artist's work, noting that the work "satirizes the melodrama of soap operas and serial comics, turning the drama of the title figure's potential suicide into a high camp performance".

In 2009, Lanchner wrote of how Lichtenstein's translation of a "highly charged" content with coolly handled presentation intensified the contrast between the two.

Many sources describe Whaam! and Drowning Girl as Lichtenstein's most famous works. It is also regarded as one of his most influential works along with Whaam! and Look Mickey. John Elderfield, Museum of Modern Art chief curator noted that the 2004 "MoMA in Berlin" exhibition held during the museum's renovation was a "synoptic overview of 20th-century art". Highlights from the 212-piece exhibition according to various publications such as The New York Times and artnet were van Gogh's The Starry Night, Matisse's Dance and Lichtenstein's Drowning Girl, all of which were touring outside the United States for the first time.

Drowning Girl was part of the largest-ever retrospective of Lichtenstein, which visited the Art Institute of Chicago (May 22–September 3, 2012), the National Gallery of Art in Washington, D.C. (October 14–January 13, 2013), the Tate Modern in London (February 21–May 27, 2013), and the Centre Pompidou (July 3–November 4, 2013). During the 2012–13 retrospective, The Huffington Post described Drowning Girl as Lichtenstein's "masterpiece of melodrama". Danish art critic and Louisiana Museum of Modern Art director Poul Erik Tøjner called the work an example of Lichtenstein's "post-coital perdition" pieces, describing it as the "star witness" of this genre of his works. He notes that the subject is reaching far-flung depths as she acts out of pride. Tøjner perceived eroticism in this painting, likening the open mouth to a vaginal feature and noting the singularity of Lichtenstein using an open mouth. With that in mind, he compares the tears to ejaculate residue.

== See also ==
- 1963 in art
