= John Romita =

John Romita may refer to:

- John Romita Sr. (1930–2023), American comic book artist best known for his art on The Amazing Spider-Man for Marvel Comics in the 1960s
- John Romita Jr. (born 1956), American comic book artist, son of John Romita, Sr; best known in 1970s–2000s for Iron Man, Uncanny X-Men, and The Amazing Spider-Man
