= Masterpiece (Lichtenstein) =

Painting by Roy Lichtenstein

- Artist: Roy Lichtenstein
- Year: 1962
- Movement: Pop art
- Dimensions: 137 cm × 137 cm (54 in × 54 in)
- Location: Private collection

Masterpiece is a pop art painting by Roy Lichtenstein, from 1962, that uses his classic Ben-Day dots and narrative content contained within a speech balloon. In 2017, the painting sold for $165 million.

== Background ==
According to the Lichtenstein Foundation website, Masterpiece was part of Lichtenstein's first exhibition at Ferus Gallery in Los Angeles from April 1 – April 27, 1963, featuring Drowning Girl, Portrait of Madame Cézanne and other works from 1962 and 1963. When discussing another work (I Know...Brad), Lichtenstein stated that the name Brad sounded heroic to him and was used with the aim of clichéd oversimplification. Drowning Girl is another notable work with Brad as the heroic subject.

The source of this image was a comic book panel with the two subjects positioned similarly to their position here, but they were situated in an automobile. In the source image the narrative content of the speech balloon said "But someday the bitterness will pass..."

Masterpiece was part of the largest ever retrospective of Lichtenstein, which visited The Art Institute of Chicago from May 16 to September 3, 2012, the National Gallery of Art in Washington, D.C., from October 14, 2012, to January 13, 2013, the Tate Modern in London from February 21 to May 27, 2013, and The Centre Pompidou from July 3 to November 4, 2013. Several publications presented Masterpiece as part of their announcement of the retrospective.

In January 2017, Agnes Gund sold the 1962 painting Masterpiece, which for years hung over the mantle of her Upper East Side apartment, for $165 million. The proceeds of the sale were used to inaugurate the Art for Justice Fund, a fund for criminal justice reform. The price was one of the fifteen highest ever to be paid for an artwork. The purchaser was Steven A. Cohen.

== Critical response ==
Masterpiece is regarded as a tongue-in-cheek joke that reflects upon Lichtenstein's own career. In retrospect, the joke is considered "witty and yet eerily prescient" because it portended some of the future turmoil that the artist would endure. In the painting, the blonde woman's speech bubble, "Why, Brad darling, This painting is a masterpiece! My, soon you'll have all of New York clamoring for your work!" conveys her remark as she gazes at the painting, of which a corner of the back is shown. Silent Brad conveys his agreement by his facial expression. Adrian Searle of The Guardian says that the 1962 work, whose narrative and graphical content were both borrowed, was timely because Lichtenstein had his first exhibition in New York City at Leo Castelli Gallery that year, making the painting aspirational in an ironic way that comments on success and "the socio-sexual status of the hot young artist". The satirical commentary on Lichtenstein's career, followed the inside joke made the year before in Mr. Bellamy. According to Roberta Smith of The New York Times, Masterpiece was one of Lichtenstein's works created in a way that produced "faint and uneven" Ben Day dots.

== See also ==
- 1962 in art
- List of most expensive paintings
