= Romance comics =

Comics genre

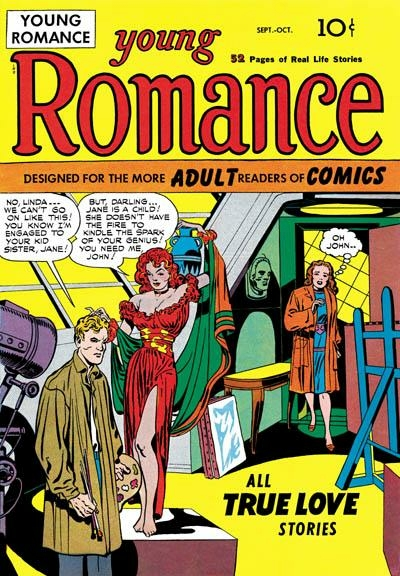
- Young Romance #1 (Oct. 1947) launched the genre. Cover art by Joe Simon and Jack Kirby.
- Authors: Matt Baker; Jay Scott Pike; Alex Toth; Mike Sekowsky; Marie Severin
- Publishers: Crestwood Publications; Fox Feature Syndicate; Charlton Comics; Fawcett Comics; DC Comics
- Publications: Young Romance; My Romance; My Life; Sweethearts; Young Love

Romance comics is a genre of comic books that were most popular during the Golden Age of Comics. The market for comics, which had been growing rapidly throughout the 1940s, began to plummet after the end of World War II when military contracts to provide disposable reading matter to servicemen ended. This left many comic creators seeking new markets. In 1947, part of an effort to tap into new adult audiences, the romance comic genre was created by Joe Simon and Jack Kirby with the Crestwood Publications title Young Romance.

== History ==
As World War II ended the popularity of superhero comics diminished, and in an effort to retain readers comic publishers began diversifying more than ever into such genres as war, Western, science fiction, crime, horror and romance comics. The genre took its immediate inspiration from the romance pulps; confession magazines such as True Story; radio soap operas, and newspaper comic strips that focused on love, domestic strife, and heartache, such as Rex Morgan, M.D. and Mary Worth. Teen humor comics had romantic plots before the invention of romance comics.

Simon and Kirby's Young Romance debuted in 1947. In the next 30 years, over 200 issues of the flagship romance comic would be produced.

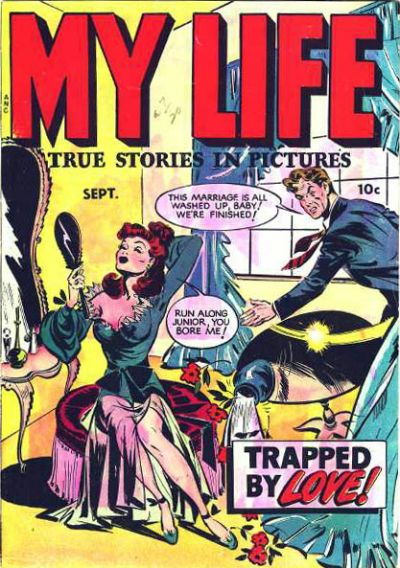
The first issue of Fox Feature Syndicate's My Life (Sept. 1948) was the third romance comic book title on the newsstands following Crestwood's Young Romance and Timely/Marvel's My Romance.

By 1950, more than 150 romance titles were on the newsstands from publishers such as Quality Comics, Avon, Lev Gleason Publications, and National (DC Comics). More than one in four of the comic books released in the first half of that year were romance comics and a graph in Newsdealer magazine for that year showed that women aged 17-25 were reading more comic books than the males. The number of titles was too many for the market to bear; there was a collapse in the last half of 1950, followed by a more sustainable revival in the years 1951-56.

Love comic books typically featured several self-contained stories per issue, narrated in the first person by the female protagonist of the story in a confessional style.

The DC Comics romance line was initially overseen by Jack Miller, who also wrote many stories. (Later, a number of female editors oversaw DC's romance line, including Zena Brody and Dorothy Woolfolk.) As author Michelle Nolan writes, "National's romance line was remarkably stable and thus must have sold consistently well. Beginning in 1952, ... the company produced Girls' Love Stories, Girls' Romances, and Secret Hearts on a bi-monthly basis through late 1957, when those three titles along with Falling in Love began to appear eight times per year.... The company picked up a fifth romance title, Heart Throbs, ... after Quality Comics left the business in 1956." By 1970, right before the romance market collapsed, DC had seven romance titles.

Fox Feature Syndicate published over two dozen love comics with 17 featuring "My" in the title—My Desire, My Secret, My Secret Affair, et al.

Charlton Comics published a wide line of romance titles, particularly after 1953 when it acquired the Fawcett Comics line, which included Sweethearts, Romantic Secrets, and Romantic Story. Sweethearts was the comics world's first monthly romance title (debuting in 1948), and Charlton continued publishing it until 1973.

Artists known for their work on romance comics during the period included Tony Abruzzo, Matt Baker, Frank Frazetta, Everett Kinstler, Jay Scott Pike, John Prentice, John Romita, Sr., Mike Sekowsky, Leonard Starr, Alex Toth, and Wally Wood. Romance comics were relatively welcoming to women artists; notable female artists of the 1950s included Alice Kirkpatrick, Valerie Barclay, Ruth Atkinson and Ann Brewster.

=== Decline and Golden Age demise ===
In his book Seduction of the Innocent (1954), Fredric Wertham argued that romance comics sexualized female characters, stating that many of them used sensual images, such as accentuated breasts and hips, to attract the attention of readers, especially teenage boys, which he saw as a form of premature and inappropriate sexual stimulation.

He also mocked warnings such as “Not Intended For Children,” which, according to him, only increased youthful interest, and satirized figures such as the “super-lover,” the romantic version of superheroes. For Wertham, these magazines were even more boring than detective comics, filled with sentimentality, false feelings, and hypocrisy.

Following the implementation of the Comics Code in 1954, publishers of romance comics self-censored the content of their publications, making the stories bland and innocent with an emphasis on traditional patriarchial concepts of women's behavior, gender roles, domesticity, and marriage. Visually, women became less sexualized and their clothing more modest. In reprints of romance comics, scenes and dialogue were redrawn to comply with the Code's standards: clothing was added, suggestive poses were removed, and in some cases, even the speech balloons were replaced.

When the sexual revolution questioned the values promoted in romance comics, along with the decline in comics in general, romance comics began their slow fade. DC Comics, Marvel Comics, and Charlton Comics carried a few romance titles into the middle 1970s, but the genre never regained the level of popularity it once enjoyed. The era of romance comics came to an end with the last issues of Young Romance and Young Love in the middle 1970s.

Charlton and DC artist and editor Dick Giordano stated in 2005: "[G]irls simply outgrew romance comics ... [The content was] too tame for the more sophisticated, sexually liberated, women's libbers [who] were able to see nudity, strong sexual content, and life the way it really was in other media. Hand-holding and pining after the cute boy on the football team just didn't do it anymore, and the Comics Code wouldn't pass anything that truly resembled real-life relationships." Comic book artist and historian Trina Robbins points out that the stories were by then edited and written by people who were out of touch with the interests of girls and young women: "the stories, no matter how well-drawn, read as though they were written by clueless forty-five year old men - which they were."

Decades later, romance-themed comics made a modest resurgence with Arrow Publications' "My Romance Stories", Renegade Comics Renegade Romance, Dark Horse Comics' manga-style adaptations of Harlequin novels, and long-running serials such as Strangers in Paradise — described by one reviewer as an attempt "to single-handedly update an entire genre with a new, skewed look at relationships and friendships."

== In popular culture ==
Pop artist Roy Lichtenstein derived many of his best-known works from the panels of romance comics:

- Crying Girl (1963) — adapted from "Escape from Loneliness," pencilled by Tony Abruzzo and inked by Bernard Sachs, in Secret Hearts #88 (DC Comics, June 1963)
- Crying Girl (1964) — adapted from "Exit Love--Enter Heartbreak!", drawn by Werner Roth and John Romita Sr. in Secret Hearts #88 (DC Comics, June 1963)
- Drowning Girl (1963) — Lichtenstein adapted the splash page from "Run for Love!", illustrated by Tony Abruzzo and lettered by Ira Schnapp, in Secret Hearts #83 (DC Comics, November 1962)
- Hopeless (1963) — adapted from a panel from the same story, "Run for Love!", artwork by Tony Abruzzo and lettered by Ira Schnapp, in Secret Hearts #83 (November 1962)
- In the Car (sometimes called Driving) (1963) — adapted from a Tony Abruzzo panel in Girls' Romances #78 (DC, September 1961)
- Oh, Jeff...I Love You, Too...But... (1964) — adapted from a panel by Tony Abruzzo
- Ohhh...Alright... (1964) — also derived from Secret Hearts #88 (June 1963)
- Sleeping Girl (1964) — based on a Tony Abruzzo panel from Girls' Romances #105 (October 1964).
- We Rose Up Slowly (1964) — based on a panel from Girls' Romances #81 (January 1962)

== Notable romance comics ==
Title	Publisher	Issues	Publ. dates	Notes
A Date with Judy	DC	79	1947–1960	Combined romance with humor
Falling in Love	DC	143	1955–1973	
First Love Illustrated	Harvey	90	1949–1963	Harvey's only notable romance comic
Girls' Love Stories	DC	180	1949–1973	
Girls' Romances	DC	160	1950–1971	
Heart Throbs	Quality/ DC	146	1949–1972	Acquired from Quality in 1957
I Love You	Charlton	124	1955-1980	
Just Married	Charlton	114	1958-1976	
Love Diary	Charlton	102	1958-1976	
Love Romances	Marvel	101	1949-1963	
Lovelorn/ Confessions of the Lovelorn	American	114	1949-1960	
Millie the Model	Marvel	207	1945-1973	Ostensibly a humor title; only a true romance comic from 1963 to 1967
My Date Comics	Hillman	4	1947-1948	Simon & Kirby; first humor-romance comic
My Life: True Stories in Pictures	Fox	12	1948-1950	Fox's longest-running romance comic — the only one of the company's 17 romance series with the word "My" in the title to last more than 8 issues
Patsy Walker	Marvel	124	1945-1965	Ostensibly a humor title; only a true romance comic in 1964–1965
Romantic Adventures/ My Romantic Adventures	American	138	1949–1964	
Romantic Secrets	Fawcett/ Charlton	87	1949–1964	Acquired from Fawcett in 1953
Romantic Story	Fawcett/ Charlton	130	1949–1973	Acquired from Fawcett in 1954
Secret Hearts	DC	153	1949–1971	Published at various times by the National (DC) romance imprints Arleigh Publishing Co./Corp. and Beverly Publishing Co.
Strangers in Paradise	Abstract Studio	106	1994-2007	
Superman's Girl Friend, Lois Lane	DC	137	1958–1974	Ditched the romance angle by c. 1970; eventually merged into The Superman Family
Sweethearts	Fawcett/ Charlton	170	1948-1973	First monthly romance comic; acquired from Fawcett in 1954
Teen Confessions	Charlton	97	1959-1976	
Teen-Age Romances	St. John	45	1949-1955	
Teen-Age Love	Charlton	93	1958-1973	
Young Love	Crestwood/ DC	199	1947–1977	Acquired from Crestwood in 1963
Young Romance	Crestwood/ DC	208	1947–1975	Generally considered the first romance comic, created by Simon & Kirby. Acquired from Crestwood in 1963

=== Reprints ===
Comics historian John Benson collected and analyzed St. John Publications' romance comics in Romance Without Tears (Fantagraphics, 2003), focusing on the elusive comics scripter Dana Dutch, and the companion volume Confessions, Romances, Secrets and Temptations: Archer St. John and the St. John Romance Comics (Fantagraphics, 2007). To research the 1950s era of romance comics, Benson interviewed Ric Estrada, Joe Kubert and Leonard Starr, plus several St. John staffers, including editor Irwin Stein, production artist Warren Kremer and editorial assistant Nadine King.

In 2011, an anthology Agonizing Love: The Golden Era of Romance Comics, edited by Michael Barson, was published by Harper Design. In 2012, many of Simon and Kirby's romance comics were reprinted by Fantagraphics in a collection entitled Young Romance: The Best of Simon & Kirby's 1940s-'50s Romance Comics, edited by Michel Gagné.

== British romance comics ==
Romance comics in the United Kingdom also flourished in the mid-1950s with such weekly titles as Mirabelle (Pearson), Picture Romances (Newnes/IPC), Valentine (Amalgamated Press), and Romeo (DC Thomson). All four titles lasted into the 1970s. Other British romance comics included Marilyn (1955–1965), New Glamour (1956–1958), Roxy (1958–1963), Marty (1960–1963), and Serenade (1962–1963); all of which eventually merged into Valentine and Mirabelle (Valentine itself merged into Mirabelle in 1974). (Note: In contrast to romance comics, which were aimed at older teens and young women, the prevalent form of UK comics marketed to females were girls' comics, geared toward younger teens, which also flourished during this period. These weekly comics developed more of a romance angle in the 1980s.)

In 1956–1957 DC Thomson launched a line of monthly romance titles: Blue Rosette Romances, Golden Heart Love Stories, Love & Life Library, and Silver Moon Romances. In April 1965, all four titles were merged into the single weekly Star Love Stories title, with one issue per month maintaining the cover logo from the original companion titles. Star Love Stories, which changed its name to Star Love Stories in Pictures in 1976, lasted until 1990.

The photo comic romance titles Photo Love and Photo Secret debuted in 1979 and 1980 respectively. They both eventually merged into another publication.

== See also ==
- List of romance comics
- British girls' comics
- Shōjo manga
