= John Rosenberger =

American cartoonist (1918–1977)

- Born: John Francis Rosenberger; November 30, 1918 Richmond Hill, Queens, U.S.
- Died: January 24, 1977 (aged 58)
- Areas: Penciller, inker
- Notable works: Girls' Romances; Superman's Girl Friend, Lois Lane; The Superman Family

John Francis Rosenberger (November 30, 1918 – January 24, 1977), also occasionally credited as John Diehl, was an American comics artist and painter from after the Second World War until the mid-1970s. Educated at the Pratt Institute, he worked primarily in the romance and superhero genres of comics, with forays into many other subjects.

== Biography ==
=== Early life (1918–1945) ===
Rosenberger was born and grew up in the Richmond Hill neighborhood of Queens. During early childhood, he was bedridden for two years with scarlet fever. It was during this time he began to draw. His father, a printer, encouraged John's artistic ambitions, and recruited him to help at the print shop. John continued to draw, and took inspiration from such artists as Norman Rockwell, Alex Raymond, Hal Foster, and Milton Caniff.

In 1938, Rosenberger enrolled in night classes at the Pratt Institute, where he met and started a romantic relationship with Marguerite "Peggy" Chapellier. Peggy was a fellow student as well as the daughter of prominent art dealer George Chapellier. During their time at Pratt, John was painting houses and Peggy worked for Western Publishing as a comics colorist. The two continued to see each other as they took classes through 1941, and were married on May 27, 1942.

Soon after the marriage, John was drafted into the U.S. Army, compelling the couple to relocate to Washington, D.C. There, John taught at the U.S. Army Corps of Engineers School at Fort Belvoir, and was editor of the military magazine The Specialist, to which he contributed pin-ups and other illustrations. In 1943 John was sent overseas for the remainder of the war, working on the construction of an oil pipeline in the China Burma India Theater. The Rosenbergers' first son John was born while he was away.

After the war, the Rosenbergers moved into a new house in Jackson Heights, Queens, and John took a job at his father-in-law's gallery, eventually becoming manager. Chapellier Galleries was located next to the Whitney Museum, and dealt in American art, endorsing such painters as William Merritt Chase, Robert Henri and Frank Duveneck. Meanwhile, Rosenberger painted portraits and spent evenings and free time preparing samples of his art and looking for publishers.

=== Early comics career (1946–1960) ===
Rosenberger had done a bit of work for Dell Comics before the war. He started comics work again in 1946, and by 1949 he was working entirely freelance. He had left his job at the gallery in April 1948, and was soon working on crime, western, adventure, and romance stories for several different publishers.

Robert Bernstein was a writer Rosenberger met while drawing for Brevity, Inc., a company which produced industrial, political, and educational comics in booklet form. The pair pitched an original serial newspaper strip called Sands of the South Seas a couple of years later. The proposal resulted in the publication of one issue of a comic book (retitled Sands of the South Pacific) by Toby Press. Future newspaper strip pitches were less successful, with both Christopher Crown (1959) and Chris Cross (1965) rejected by the syndicates, but the two would become frequent creative collaborators on other projects.

Other work came for Rosenberger in the form of painted covers for paperback book publishers. With his background in oil painting, this kind of work was less stressful than comics jobs, which proved to be a great pressure for him. Indeed, Rosenberger suffered a nervous breakdown in 1952, after which the family temporarily moved to a small town in Connecticut. He soon resumed working on the paperback covers, but was hesitant in going back to work for comics.

His reentry into regular comics work was facilitated by friendly encouragement from Richard E. Hughes, editor for the American Comics Group (ACG). After about a year in Connecticut, in which the Rosenbergers went deep into debt, John signed on for work with ACG and the family moved to Levittown, Long Island, close to their new good friends the Hugheses.

While there was some work from Dell-affiliated Custom Comics (which produced educational pamphlets), work with Brevity, Inc. ended when its owner unexpectedly died in 1953. There was a dispute over royalties and a failed attempt by Rosenberger and Bernstein to buy the company, but nothing came of it, leaving ACG as Rosenberger's biggest account for the mid- to late-1950s. He covered all genres for ACG, and worked in all the company's titles in some part through the mid-1960s, including Adventures into the Unknown, Forbidden Worlds, Unknown Worlds, and Romantic Adventures, all of which had managed to survive the implementation of the Comics Code Authority in 1954.

=== Superheroes and Romance (1960–1975) ===
A page of Rosenberger's work on a Lois Lane cover story in The Superman Family #166 (Aug.–Sept. 1974).

On September 6, 1960, Rosenberger started an account with Archie Publications, and soon began work on the Simon & Kirby-created title The Fly for the Archie Adventure Series. Rosenberger then teamed with Robert Bernstein to create the Jaguar in a similar mold. He served as a regular artist on several other titles for the Adventure Series before the group segued into the campy Mighty Comics.

Other projects Rosenberger worked on with Archie included the first issue of a short-lived iteration of The Shadow, written by Jerry Siegel, and some work penciling Archie stories. In late 1966 he stopped all his work with Archie Publications.

Meanwhile, Rosenberger had been working for National (now DC Comics) since 1963 on romance stories. His style suited the genre in that he kept up-to-date with fashionable hair and clothing styles. He notably drew women as ideal beauties, and his leading men were all handsome.

In 1965 he drew his first superhero story for DC. It was a Supergirl and Wonder Woman story for The Brave and the Bold #63 titled "The Revolt of the Super Chicks!", and it was an appropriate subject for Rosenberger's expertise. Cartoonist Fred Hembeck has noted that Rosenberger's superhero work showed his background in the romance genre, with "luscious babes" and a unique proficiency in rendering "expressions of impotent bewildered befuddlement" on the faces of male protagonists.

Rosenberger continued with romance work for DC in comic books such as Falling in Love, Girls' Love Stories, Girls' Romances, Secret Hearts, and Young Romance, but the genre's popularity was quickly waning. Around 1972–1974, Rosenberger was regularly working on various features for DC titles such as Strange Sports Stories, The Superman Family, Wonder Woman, and World's Finest Comics, and with such characters as Zatanna and Lois Lane. He and Robert Kanigher co-created Lady Cop in 1975. That character appeared in the fourth season of the Arrow TV series in 2015 and was portrayed by Rutina Wesley.

In 1974, Rosenberger stopped work on DC projects for unknown reasons. He started penciling for Sy Barry, the regular artist for The Phantom newspaper strip, whose eyesight was beginning to fail him. He continued with this task on-and-off for about a year.

=== Sickness and death (1976–1977) ===
Rosenberger suffered a heart attack on April 22, 1976, and took about two months off to recover. In August he was diagnosed with cancer, and he died on January 24, 1977, at the age of 58. One of his last stories was for Wonder Woman #217 (April–May 1975), for which he would pencil only the first four pages before taking ill. Subsequently, this issue was redrawn completely by Dick Dillin. The Rosenberger pages were later published in The Amazing World of DC Comics #15 (Aug. 1977).

== Bibliography ==
Comics work (interior pencil art) includes:

=== Archie Comics ===
- Adventures of The Fly #11–28 (1961–1963)
- Adventures of The Jaguar #1–15 (1961–1963)
- Adventures of Young Dr. Masters #1–2 (1964)
- Betty and Me #3 (1966)

=== DC Comics ===
- The Amazing World of DC Comics #15 (featuring the unpublished pencils of Wonder Woman #217; this story would be re-drawn by artist Dick Dillin) (1977)
- The Brave and the Bold #63 (Supergirl and Wonder Woman) (1965)
- Date with Debbi #4, 7, 16 (1969–1970)
- Falling in Love #70, 76, 80, 94, 97–102, 104–105, 107–109, 115 (1964–1970)
- 1st Issue Special #4 (Lady Cop) (1975)
- Girls' Love Stories #112–114, 119, 132, 134–135, 137, 139–140, 142, 144, 146–152, 158, 161, 168–170, 172–175 (1965–1973)
- Girls' Romances #131–136, 142–143, 146, 148, 151, 159 (1968–1971)
- Secret Hearts #90, 111–114, 116, 118–110, 124, 130, 134, 138–140, 145, 148 (1963–1970)
- Strange Sports Stories #4–6 (1974)
- Supergirl #1 (Zatanna backup story); #5 (1972–1973)
- The Superman Family #166, 169 (Lois Lane); #168 (Supergirl) (1974–1975)
- Superman's Girl Friend, Lois Lane #122–137 (1972–1974)
- The Unexpected #177 (1977)
- Wonder Woman #215–216 (1974–1975)
- Young Love #67–68, 104 (1968–1974)
- Young Romance #152, 158, 160–161, 163, 166–167, 173–175, 197–198 (1968–1974)

=== Marvel Comics ===
- Adventures into Terror #31 (1954)
- Adventures into Weird Worlds #22–23 (1953)
- Journey into Unknown Worlds #16–17, 27 (1953–1954)
- Where Monsters Dwell #28 (1974)

Preceded by Werner Roth	Superman's Girl Friend, Lois Lane penciller 1972–1974	Succeeded by n/a
Preceded by Curt Swan	Wonder Woman penciller 1974–1975	Succeeded by Dick Dillin
