= Lady Cop =

- Lady Cop from 1st Issue Special #4, artist Dick Giordano.

Publication information
- Publisher: DC Comics
- First appearance: 1st Issue Special #4 (July 1975)
- Created by: Robert Kanigher; John Rosenberger

In-story information
- Alter ego: Liza Warner

The Lady Cop is a fictional police officer, a comic book character published by DC Comics. She debuted in 1st Issue Special #4 (July 1975), and was created by Robert Kanigher and John Rosenberger.

The Lady Cop is Liza Warner, a young woman who watches from beneath a bed as a murderer in cowboy boots slaughters her two roommates, leaving the ace of spades behind as his calling card. Later a policewoman (circa 1975) praises her eidetic memory, calling her a "born police officer". Liza enrolls in the unnamed metropolitan city's police academy, performing her civic duty while hoping to one day find the mysterious "killer in boots". After a long absence, Liza Warner appeared in The All-New Atom #6 and #12, now as chief of police for Ivy Town.

Liza Warner appeared in the fourth and fifth seasons of Arrow, portrayed by Rutina Wesley.

== In other media ==
Liza Warner appears in Arrow, portrayed by Rutina Wesley. In the series, Liza is a former police sergeant for the Star City Police Department and a member of its anti-vigilante task force who goes rogue following the events of the third season. In the episodes "Beyond Redemption" and "The Sin-Eater", Warner clashes with Team Arrow and joins forces with China White and Carrie Cutter in a failed attempt at taking over Star City.

== See also ==
- Police Woman
