= Crying Girl =

Two works by Roy Lichtenstein

Crying Girl (1963), Roy Lichtenstein, lithograph on lightweight, off-white wove paper, 16 by 24 inches (40.6 cm × 61.0 cm)

Crying Girl (1964), Roy Lichtenstein, porcelain enamel on steel, 46 by 46 inches (116.8 cm × 116.8 cm)

Crying Girl is the name of two different works by Roy Lichtenstein: a 1963 offset lithograph on lightweight, off-white wove paper and a 1964 porcelain enamel on steel.

== Background ==
During the late 1950s and early 1960s, many American painters began to adapt the imagery and motifs of comics. Lichtenstein in 1958 made drawings of comic strip characters. Andy Warhol produced his earliest paintings in this style in 1960. Lichtenstein, unaware of Warhol's work, produced Look Mickey and Popeye in 1961. In the early 1960s, Lichtenstein produced several "fantasy drama" paintings of women in love affairs with domineering men, causing women to be miserable. These works served as prelude to 1964 paintings of innocent "girls next door" in a variety of tenuous emotional states. Picasso's depictions of weeping women may have influenced Lichtenstein to produce portrayals of vulnerable teary-eyed women. Another possible influence on his emphasis on depicting distressed women in the early to mid-1960s was that his first marriage was dissolving at the time. Lichtenstein's first marriage to Isabel Wilson, which resulted in two sons, lasted from 1949 to 1965.

Although single-panel comic representations depict a moment in time, both works are examples in which the moment is "pregnant" with drama related to other times. This work also marks a phase in Lichtenstein's career when many of his works were named with present-participial names such as Sleeping Girl, Crying Girl and Blonde Waiting, which accentuates the works' "relation to process and action."

== 1963 lithograph ==
The lithograph, which shows a crying woman with her hand near her mouth, is on lightweight, off-white wove paper. It measures 16 by 24 inches (40.6 cm × 61.0 cm). This image was adapted from a comic book panel from the romance comic Secret Hearts #88 (DC Comics, June 1963), in the story "Escape from Loneliness," penciled by Tony Abruzzo and inked by Bernard Sachs.

Artist Chuck Close claimed to have purchased the lithograph from Leo Castelli on a visit to New York in 1963 for $10 ($105 in 2025 dollars). Close recalled the purchase: "I remember I bought [a] Roy Lichtenstein... for [ten] dollars from Leo Castelli at Lichtenstein's first [sic] show. I brought it back to Yale and I was attacked unmercifully." (Lichtenstein's first solo show at The Leo Castelli Gallery in New York City, which sold out before opening, ran from February 10 through March 3, 1962. His second solo exhibition at the Leo Castelli Gallery ran from September 28 through October 24, 1963.)

== 1964 enamel ==
Comic book source: a Werner Roth/John Romita Sr. panel from Secret Hearts #88 (DC Comics June 1963)

The porcelain enamel on steel, which depicts a woman wiping away a tear, measures 46 by 46 inches (116.8 cm × 116.8 cm). It was adapted from a story in the same romance comic, Secret Hearts #88 (DC Comics, June 1963): "Exit Love--Enter Heartbreak!", drawn by Werner Roth and John Romita Sr.

The 1964 enamel has been held at the Milwaukee Art Museum since 1965, and is considered to be one of Roy Lichtenstein's earliest attempts at producing enamel-on-steel works from the same type of comic book imagery he had begun producing as conventional hand-painted canvases.

== See also ==
- 1963 in art
