= Girls' Love Stories =

Comic book published by DC Comics

- Cover to issue #1 of Girls' Love Stories, August–September 1949.

Publication information
- Publisher: DC Comics
- Schedule: Bi-monthly (#1-47, #175-180); 8 times a year (#48-161); Monthly (#162-174)
- Format: Ongoing
- Publication date: August–September 1949 — November–December 1973
- No. of issues: 180

Creative team
- Written by: Zena Brody, Bob Kanigher, Lee Goldsmith, Barbara Friedlander, George Kashdan, Jack Miller, Phyllis Reed, Morris Waldinger
- Artist(s): Bill Draut, Bob Oksner, Jay Scott Pike, John Romita, Sr.
- Penciller(s): Tony Abruzzo, Gil Kane, Art Peddy, Joe Rosen, John Rosenberger, Mike Sekowsky, Morris Waldinger
- Inker(s): Vince Colletta, Frank Giacoia, Mike Peppe, Bernard Sachs
- Editor(s): Zena Brody, Phyllis Reed, Bob Kanigher

Girls' Love Stories was an American romance comic book magazine published by DC Comics in the United States. Started in 1949 as DC's first romance title, it ran for 180 issues, ending with the Nov-Dec 1973 issue. The stories covered such topics as girls worrying about getting a man, or marrying out of pressure, not love. Some of the early covers were photographs. The book's initial tagline was "True to Life!"

Writers for the title included Bob Kanigher, George Kashdan and Steven Pineda. Notable artists for Girls' Love Stories included George Tuska, Tony Abruzzo, Vince Colletta, Bill Draut, Frank Giacoia, Gil Kane, Bob Oksner, Art Peddy, Jay Scott Pike, John Romita Sr., Joe Rosen, John Rosenberger, Bernard Sachs, and Mike Sekowsky.

Editor Zena Brody began working on Girls' Love Stories in 1952.

Images taken from Girls' Love Stories have been used in some of Roy Lichtenstein's work.
