= Secret Hearts =

Defunct romance comics series

Publication information
- Publisher: DC Comics
- Schedule: Bi-monthly, 8x per year
- Format: Ongoing
- Genre: Romance
- Publication date: Sept.–Oct. 1949 – July 1971
- No. of issues: 153

Creative team
- Written by: Gerry Conway, Natalie Krigstein, Ann Martin, Jack Oleck, Len Wein
- Artist(s): Tony Abruzzo, Liz Berube, Nick Cardy, John Celardo, Gene Colan, Vince Colletta, Tony DeZuniga, Bill Draut, Lee Elias, Frank Giacoia, Dick Giordano, Sid Greene, Carmine Infantino, Gil Kane, Bob Oksner, Arthur Peddy, Carl Pfeufer, Jay Scott Pike, John Romita Sr., John Rosenberger, Joe Rosen, Werner Roth, Mike Sekowsky, Alex Toth, Win Mortimer
- Letterer(s): Ira Schnapp
- Editor(s): Jack Miller, Zena Brody (c. 1952–c. 1957), Ruth Brant, Phyllis Reed, Dorothy Woolfolk, Barbara Friedlander

Secret Hearts was a romance comic anthology published by DC Comics in the United States, primarily in the 1950s and '60s. A staple of the company's romance line, it was "one of the publisher's most successful and well-known romance titles."

Notable artists featured in Secret Hearts include Mike Sekowsky, John Romita Sr., Jay Scott Pike, Tony Abruzzo, Liz Berube, John Celardo, Gene Colan, John Rosenberger, Joe Rosen, and Werner Roth.

Pop artist Roy Lichtenstein based a number of his works, including Drowning Girl (1963), on panels from Secret Hearts.

== Publication history ==
DC published Secret Hearts under a variety of the company's romance line imprints, including Arleigh Publishing Co./Corp. and Beverly Publishing Co., as well as the typical National Periodical Publications, Inc.. Debuting with a Sept.–Oct. 1949 cover-date, Secret Hearts ran for 153 issues, ending with the July 1971 issue.

Secret Hearts was released on a bimonthly schedule from 1949 to mid-1957, when it went to an eight-times-a-year schedule. The first six issues of the title were 52 pages each; it underwent a publishing hiatus of nearly a year and a half between issue #6 (July–August 1950) and #7 (December 1951-January 1952). When the comic returned, it was 36 pages per issue, where it stayed for the remainder of its run.

By the title's 150th issue (cover date March 1971), circulation had dropped to an average of 140,927, with only 53 subscriptions. The final issue of Secret Hearts came out on May 20, 1971. It was the first of DC's seven romance titles to be canceled.

== Overview ==
Each issue of Secret Hearts featured at least three separate stories of romance, each one usually about 8 pages in length. In 1964, the title began running serialized soap opera-style stories; the first one beginning in issue #96 (June 1964), featuring Amy Ames, "Miss Listening Heart" of the Daily Star. The series lasted through #109 (Jan. 1966) (skipping #108).

"Reach for Happiness," written by Jack Miller, was another serialized story that ran for 29 consecutive episodes from issue #110 (Mar. 1966) through issue #138 (Sept. 1969). About the town of Danville Corners, "Reach for Happiness," was a knockoff of the hit TV soap opera Peyton Place. The story grew increasingly complex, so much so that the publisher included a one-page update about the cast. The ending of "Reach for Happiness" "was unorthodox for the time period, to say the least: On the final page, heroine Karen asks hero Greg, 'Oh, Greg, Greg, Greg, my darling — will you marry me?' To which our man of few words replies, 'You bet I will!'"

The title's letters page, called Ann Martin, Counselor-at-Love, featured romantic advice to readers.

== Connection with Roy Lichtenstein ==
Pop artist Roy Lichtenstein based a number of his works on panels from Secret Hearts. One of Lichtenstein's most well-known works, Drowning Girl (1963), was adapted from the splash page of "Run for Love!", from Secret Hearts #83 (Nov. 1962), illustrated by Tony Abruzzo and lettered by Ira Schnapp. Other notable examples of Lichtenstein works based on panels from Secret Hearts include:

- Hopeless (1963) — adapted from a panel from the same story, "Run for Love!", artwork by Abruzzo and lettered by Schnapp, in Secret Hearts #83 (Nov. 1962)
- Crying Girl (1963) — adapted from "Escape from Loneliness," penciled by Abruzzo and inked by Bernard Sachs, in Secret Hearts #88 (June 1963)
- Crying Girl (1964) — adapted from "Exit Love--Enter Heartbreak!", drawn by Werner Roth and John Romita Sr., in Secret Hearts #88 (June 1963)
- Ohhh...Alright... (1964) — also derived from Secret Hearts #88 (June 1963)
