= Tony Abruzzo =

American comic book artist (1916–1990)

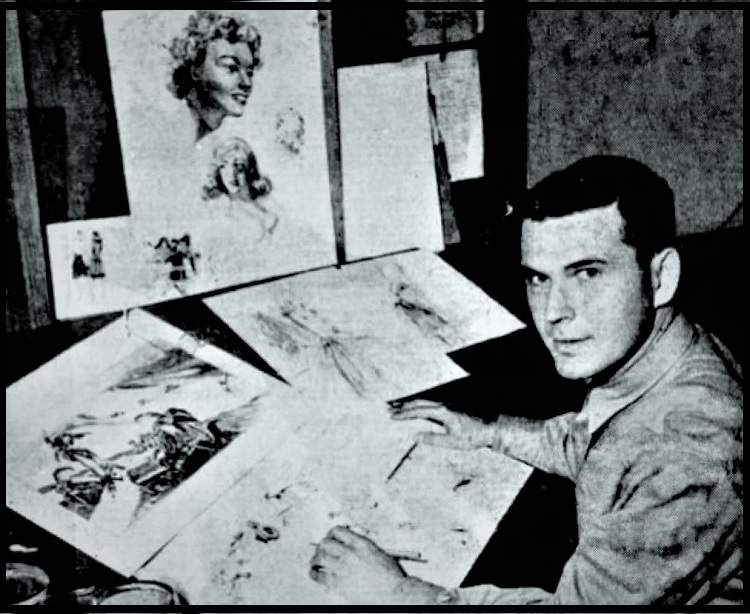
- Abruzzo in 1942, while in the U.S. Army
- Born: June 21, 1916 New York City, U.S.
- Died: December 30, 1990 (aged 74) Brooklyn, New York
- Area: Penciller
- Notable works: Girls' Love Stories

Anthony Joseph "Tony" Abruzzo (1916–1990) was an American comic book artist. He is best known for his work in the romance comics field for National Periodicals (later DC Comics), particularly Girls' Love Stories, for which he illustrated stories continuously from 1954 to 1972. In the early 1960s, pop artist Roy Lichtenstein derived many of his best-known works from the panels of romance comics that had been illustrated by Abruzzo.

== Biography ==
=== Early life and education ===
Anthony Joseph Abruzzo was born in 1916 in New York City, the child of Sicilian immigrant Antonio Abruzzo Jr. and Amelia (Mildred) Kehnle. Tony Abruzzo's father was an underemployed professional entertainer, and he grew up amidst familial tension as his parents' marriage deteriorated. After their divorce, he lived with his mother, who remarried a man named Louis Priore, in Ozone Park, Queens, where Tony was raised. Meanwhile, Anthony's father remarried a woman named Evelyn Hayes.

Young Tony flourished, embracing a diverse array of activities at Alexander Hamilton High School in Brooklyn. His involvement in the school's drama society garnered attention, as did his poetry, which was entered into an annual national writing competition sponsored by Scholastic magazine. Four of Abruzzo's poems were published in the 1933 edition of Scholastic's Saplings.

Abruzzo trained at the Traphagen School of Fashion, and initially gained recognition as a dress designer. Possibly inspired by his aunt and grandmother, who were also dressmakers. He also ventured into fashion advertisement design and harbored aspirations of moving to Paris to pursue a career in fashion. From Traphagen, Abruzzo moved to the Pratt Institute, receiving a certificate in pictorial illustration from Pratt in April 1937.

=== Army service ===
The outbreak of World War II interrupted Abruzzo's plans as he was drafted into the U.S. Army. During his military service, at Fort Knox near Louisville, Kentucky, he illustrated tanks, scout cars, and jeeps for specialized Armored Force training manuals. While in the Army, he was the subject of a number of news articles about his diverse drawing talents. He also began publishing comics in the Army, including a comic strip called Randy Allen, both in Armored Force News and Army Times.

In 1944, Abruzzo's comic strip work was exhibited as part of a group show at Louisville's historic Brown Hotel, sponsored by the Courier-Journal, The Louisville Times, and the Kentucky Press Association. Abruzzo left the Army with the rank of sergeant.

=== Comics career ===
After the war, Abruzzo found work as a comic book artist, initially for the Christian publisher Standard Publishing (based in Cincinnati). Comics Abruzzo worked on in 1946–1947 included Mission: Rescue!, Parables Jesus Told, and Life of Esther Visualized, all written by Dorothy Fay Foster.

By the early 1950s, Abruzzo had transitioned to working as a comic book artist for National Periodicals (the predecessor of DC Comics). His background in the fashion industry positioned him as a fitting artist for the company's extensive array of romance titles. Abruzzo’s earliest signed artwork in a romance comic was in Secret Hearts #12 (Oct.-Nov. 1952), published by Beverly Publishing, a National imprint. Throughout the early 1970s, Abruzzo illustrated numerous love stories featuring captivating female protagonists in titles such as Girls' Love Stories, Girls' Romances, Secret Hearts, Young Love, Young Romance, and Falling in Love. Robert Kanigher, a long-time DC editor, said of Abruzzo, that he was, "The finest artist in the romance field, bar none."

=== Personal life and death ===
Abruzzo died in Brooklyn, New York, on December 30, 1990, at age 74. He never married or had children.

When asked about the life of Abruzzo, Robin Snyder (a comic book writer) said,"I have been looking for this fellow for over 30 years. He is the great lost mystery man of the comics." Highlighting the limited information available on Abruzzo's life outside his illustrations in comics.

== Abruzzo and Lichtenstein ==
Roy Lichtenstein made a splash in the 1960s with his pop art "appropriations" based on the work of Abruzzo and other comic book artists, who rarely received any credit. One of Lichtenstein's most well-known works, Drowning Girl (1963), was adapted from the splash page of "Run for Love!", illustrated by Abruzzo and lettered by Ira Schnapp, in Secret Hearts #83 (DC Comics, November 1962). Critics have noted that the waves in Lichtenstein's image are intended to "recall Hokusai as well as the biomorphic forms of Arp and Miró;" just as Abruzzo's art may have intended to. Lichtenstein has claimed a strong relation between Abruzzo's original panel and Hokusai's The Great Wave off Kanagawa, making this work a bridge between the two.

Notable other examples of Lichtenstein works based on Abruzzo's art include:

- Crying Girl (1963) — adapted from "Escape from Loneliness," penciled by Abruzzo and inked by Bernard Sachs, in Secret Hearts #88 (DC Comics, June 1963)
- Hopeless (1963) — adapted from a panel from the same story, "Run for Love!", artwork by Abruzzo and lettered by Schnapp, in Secret Hearts #83 (November 1962)
- In the Car (sometimes called Driving) (1963) — adapted from an Abruzzo panel in Girls' Romances #78 (DC, September 1961)
- Oh, Jeff...I Love You, Too...But... (1964)
- Ohhh...Alright... (1964) — also derived from Secret Hearts #88 (June 1963)
- Sleeping Girl (1964) — based on an Abruzzo panel from Girls' Romances #105 (October 1964)

Jack Cowart, executive director of the Lichtenstein Foundation, contests the notion that Lichtenstein was a copyist, saying: "Roy's work was a wonderment of the graphic formulae and the codification of sentiment that had been worked out by others. The panels were changed in scale, color, treatment, and in their implications. There is no exact copy." Comics industry figures don't have such a sanguine attitude about Lichtenstein's swipes.

In 2013, Abruzzo's artwork was exhibited as part of the show "Image Duplicator", curated by Rian Hughes and Jason Atomic, at Orbital Comics in London. The exhibition involved cartoonists "re-appropriating the works of Roy Lichtenstein, tracking them back to their original source material and then creating a new comic book image that credits the original artist." Abruzzo was one of the artists featured, alongside the likes of Dave Gibbons, Rian Hughes, Salgood Sam, Steven Cook, and Howard Chaykin.
