= Gaspar Saladino =

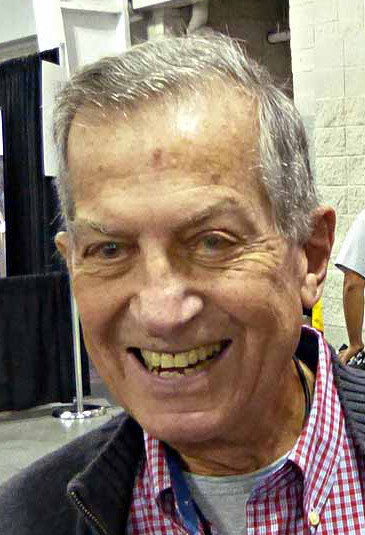
- Gaspar Saladino, 2014
- Born: September 1, 1927 Brooklyn, New York, U.S.
- Died: August 4, 2016 (aged 88)
- Areas: Letterer, logo designer
- Pseudonyms: Gaspar, Gaspar S., L.P. Gregory, Lisa Petergreg
- Notable works: Numerous DC Comics and Marvel Comics logos Arkham Asylum; Superman vs. the Amazing Spider-Man
- Awards: Shazam Award (1971, 1973)

Gaspar Saladino (September 1, 1927 – August 4, 2016) was an American letterer and logo designer who worked for more than sixty years in the comic book industry, mostly for DC Comics. Eventually Saladino went by one name, "Gaspar," which he wrote in his trademark calligraphy.

From 1966 to the 1990s, he lettered many of the logos, titles, captions and balloons on DC Comics covers. For a period in the 1970s, he was also "page-one letterer" for many Marvel Comics books.

== Biography ==
=== Early life and education ===
Saladino was born in Brooklyn, New York City, and attended Manhattan's School of Industrial Art. While in school Saladino did some comic-book inking for Lloyd Jacquet's "Funnies, Inc.", one of several "packagers" of the time that produced outsourced comics for publishers entering the new medium. After graduating from high school, Saladino enlisted in the U.S. Army, which stationed him in Japan in a public relations capacity. He returned home in 1947.

=== Career ===
==== Lettering ====
In 1949, he approached DC Comics, where production chief Sol Harrison showed Saladino's art samples to editors. One, Julius Schwartz, while unimpressed with the art, offered Saladino regular work as a letterer. Though working in the office, ensconced between letterer Ira Schnapp and production artist Mort Drucker, Saladino was employed as a freelancer, earning $2 a page and generally earning $90 a week. He recalled in a 2007 interview, "DC wanted a full-time letterer and by being present I got first choice of assignments. I also thought it was beneficial to be able to work hand in hand with the artists."

Saladino recalled in 2007 that his first job for DC was a "cowboy romance" comic. The title was Romance Trail #5 (March–April 1950) in which he lettered two stories, "Romance By Mail" with art by Carmine Infantino and Joe Giella, and a one-page poem "Western Serenade" with art by Alex Toth. These were Saladino's first printed works for DC. They were followed by more work in Romance Trail and the western series Jimmy Wakely, starting with issue #5 (June 1950).

He did much of the lettering for the humor strips of Henry Boltinoff in Action Comics. In the late 1950s and 1960s, Saladino was a mainstay on DC editor Julius Schwartz's books, like Strange Adventures, Mystery in Space, Justice League of America, The Flash, Showcase, and many more.

When Carmine Infantino came on as DC's art director and then editorial director in 1966/1967, he gradually shifted all of DC's premiere lettering tasks: logos, cover lettering and house ads, from veteran letterer Ira Schnapp to Saladino. This changed the whole line's look, adding Saladino's bold, dynamic style., Saladino continued to letter many interior pages as well.

In the late 1960s, while freelancing for DC, Saladino began freelancing for Marvel as well, using the pseudonym L.P. Gregory and lettering titles including Iron Man, The Avengers and Tales to Astonish. In the mid-to-late 1970s Saladino became the uncredited "page-one letterer" for many Marvel Comics titles. He eventually credited himself as simply either Gaspar or Gaspar S.

In 1976, Saladino lettered the historic DC-Marvel crossover comic Superman vs. the Amazing Spider-Man. He also lettered the oversize special issue Superman vs. Muhammad Ali. By 1977, Saladino was lettering most of DC's war comics, in addition to many superhero and mystery stories. From 1976 to 1977, he lettered the Los Angeles Times Syndicate comic strip The Virtue of Vera Valiant, by writer Stan Lee and artist Frank Springer.

Saladino's output after 2002 was minimal.

==== Logos ====
Swamp Thing #1, featuring Saladino's logo design. Cover art by Bernie Wrightson.

Saladino designed the logos for DC's Swamp Thing, Vigilante, Phantom Stranger, Metal Men, Adam Strange, House of Mystery, House of Secrets, and Unknown Soldier, among others. He also re-designed established character logos to make them more contemporary and stylish, such as with Green Lantern. He also did the lettering for cover blurbs for a wide variety of titles and for seasonal house ads that ran in several issues at a time.

For Marvel, Saladino's logos, which he either created or updated, include The Avengers, Sgt. Fury and his Howling Commandos, Captain America and the Falcon, and Marvel Triple Action.

In 1974, with the launch of the short-lived publisher Atlas Comics, Saladino designed logos for all the company's titles.

In the 1980s he designed logos for Neal Adams' Continuity Comics and for some titles published by Eclipse Comics.

In the 1990s he designed product logos for the Lucky Mojo Curio Company, a metaphysical supply manufactory founded by Catherine Yronwode, the former editor-in-chief of Eclipse Comics.

== Lettering style ==
A panel from Arkham Asylum (story by Grant Morrison, art by Dave McKean), showing Saladino's distinctive lettering treatment.

Saladino's default dialoguing style was curvy and naturally enmeshed with the artwork. When producing house ads or cover blurbs, he sometimes altered the standard letterforms in order to interlock letters. One trademark was his use of big, bold, oversized exclamation points.

During the early 1970s Saladino lettered the interiors for the then-new title Swamp Thing. It was in the pages of this series that he created the concept of character-designated fonts, with Swamp Thing's distinctive outlined, "drippy" letters.

Saladino always lettered by hand. Likewise, his word balloons were drawn freehand, never with a template.

== Personal life ==
Saladino and his wife Celeste were married in 1957. At first the couple lived in Queens Village, then moved to a home in Plainview, Long Island in 1959, where they lived the rest of Gaspar's life. They had three children, Greg (born in 1960), Lisa (1962) and Peter (1965). At present there are five grandchildren: Jordan, Brea, Jackson, Alyssa and Kaila. In April 2013, he was named honorary chief of the Plainview Fire Department as a 50-year member.

== Selected bibliography ==
- Justice League of America (DC, 1962–1967)
- G.I. Combat (DC, 1979–1981)
- L.E.G.I.O.N. (DC, 1989–1994)
- Hellblazer (DC/Vertigo, 1990–1994)
- The Flash, vol. 2 (DC, 1993–2002)
- R.E.B.E.L.S. (DC, 1994–1996)
- Seekers Into the Mystery (DC/Vertigo, 1996–1997)

== Awards ==
- 1971 Shazam Award: Best Letterer
- 1973 Shazam Award: Best Letterer
