= John Romita Sr. =

American comic book artist (1930–2023)

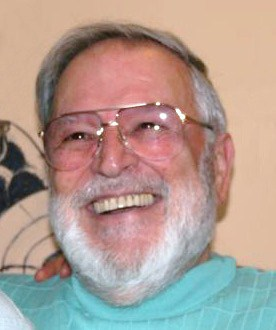
- Romita in 2006
- Born: John Victor Romita; January 24, 1930 New York City, U.S.
- Died: June 12, 2023 (aged 93) Floral Park, New York, U.S.
- Areas: Penciller, Inker
- Notable works: The Amazing Spider-Man; The Punisher
- Awards: Inkpot Award, 1979; Will Eisner Award Hall of Fame, 2002; Inkwell Awards Joe Sinnott Hall of Fame, 2020
- Spouse: Virginia Bruno (m. 1952)
- Children: 2, including John Jr.

John Victor Romita (/rəˈmiːtə/; January 24, 1930 – June 12, 2023) was an American comic book artist best known for his work on Marvel Comics' The Amazing Spider-Man and for co-creating characters including Mary Jane Watson, the Punisher, Kingpin, Wolverine, and Luke Cage. Romita was the father of John Romita Jr., also a comic book artist, and the husband of Virginia Romita, who was for many years Marvel's traffic manager.

His first comics work was in 1949 as a ghost artist for Timely Comics, the precursor to Marvel, through which Romita met editor-in-chief Stan Lee. In 1951, Romita began drawing horror, war, and romance comics for Atlas Comics (previously Timely), and also drew his first superhero work, a 1950s revival of Captain America. He worked exclusively for DC Comics from 1958 to 1965 and was the artist for many of their romance comics. During these years, Romita further developed his ability to draw beautiful women, which he later became well known for.

Romita joined Marvel in 1965, initially drawing Daredevil comics. In 1966, when Spider-Man artist and co-creator Steve Ditko left Marvel, Romita was chosen by writer Lee as the new artist for Amazing Spider-Man. Within a year of Romita becoming the Spider-Man artist, The Amazing Spider-Man rose from Marvel's second-best-selling title to the company's top-seller. Romita brought a new romance style to Spider-Man comics that soon became the new design for the character. In June 1973, Romita was promoted to Marvel's art director and heavily influenced the look of Marvel comics throughout the 1970s and 1980s. Romita was inducted into the Will Eisner Comic Book Hall of Fame in 2002.

== Early life ==
John Victor Romita was born on January 24, 1930, in Brooklyn, New York City, where he was also raised. The son of Marie and Victor Romita, a baker, he also had three sisters and a brother. Romita was of Italian descent, from Apulia and Calabria. He began drawing at 5 years old. Romita graduated from Manhattan's School of Industrial Art in 1947, having attended for three years after spending ninth grade at a Brooklyn junior high school. Among his instructors were Howard Simon, a book illustrator, and Ben Clements, a magazine illustrator. Romita was deeply influenced by a variety of artists and illustrators. As a young reader of comics, he admired Noel Sickles, Roy Crane, and Milton Caniff. Caniff's Terry and the Pirates in particular was an early inspiration for Romita. Later in his career, he also drew inspiration from Sy Barry, Alex Toth, and Carmine Infantino. Beyond comics, he looked up to commercial illustrators such as Jon Whitcomb, Coby Whitmore, and Al Parker.

On Romita's 17th birthday, he received his first artist work from the Manhattan General Hospital. An anesthesiologist paid Romita $60 a week to create a medical exhibit on pneumatology medicine, which Romita completed in six months. Romita entered the comics industry in 1949 on the series Famous Funnies. "Steven Douglas up there was a benefactor to all young artists", Romita recalled. "The first story he gave me was a love story. It was terrible. All the women looked like emaciated men and he bought it, never criticized, and told me to keep working. He paid me two hundred dollars for it and never published it—and rightfully so".

== Career ==
Romita was working at the New York City company Forbes Lithograph in 1949, earning $30 a week, when comic book inker Lester Zakarin, a friend from high school whom he ran into on a subway train, offered him either $17 or $20 a page to pencil a 10-page story, possibly a crime comic about 1920s mobsters, for him as an uncredited ghost artist. Now making more money on two pages than his usual weekly salary, Romita accepted the story and continued to ghost for Zakarin on other work. The work was for Marvel's 1940s forerunner, Timely Comics, which helped give Romita an opportunity to meet editor-in-chief and art director Stan Lee. Romita ghost-penciled for Zakarin on Trojan Comics' Crime-Smashers and other titles, eventually signing some "Zakarin and Romita".

=== Atlas Comics ===
Captain America #78 (September 1954). Cover art by Romita.

The collaboration ended in early 1951, when Romita was drafted into the U.S. Army. Taking the initiative prior to induction, he showed art samples to the base art director on Governors Island in New York Bay, who arranged for him to be stationed there to do layouts for recruitment posters once Romita had completed basic training at Fort Dix, New Jersey. Romita was promoted to corporal after seven or eight months; now allowed to live off the post, he rented an apartment in Brooklyn.

When not on duty, Romita could leave the base and go into Manhattan. In mid- to late 1951, he recalled in 2002, "I went uptown one day for lunch. I stopped over at Stan Lee's [office in the Empire State Building, where Timely Comics had by now evolved into Atlas Comics], and his secretary came out ... and I said, 'Stan doesn't know my name but I've worked for him for over a year'. I was in uniform! She must've told him this GI ... wants to do some comics. She said, 'Stan said here's a four-page science fiction story'. I penciled it and struggled with my first inking. That was the first story I did on my own. I did Westerns and war stories then". The collection Marvel Visionaries: John Romita Sr. and former Marvel editor-in-chief Roy Thomas, in Alter Ego 9, each identify that four-page science fiction story as "It!", about a murderous alien in the guise of a baby. That story saw print in Strange Tales #4 (December 1951), although the Grand Comics Database lists Romita's first identified published comic-book work as penciler and inker of the six-page story "The Bradshaw Boys" in Atlas' Western Outlaws #1 (February 1951)—published nearly a year earlier. This may refer to a ghosted Zakarin story. The Atlas Tales database lists both "It!" and the six-page "Out of My Mind", in Astonishing #7 (also December 1951), as Romita's first full penciling and inking—although "It!" carries a later job number (9118) than the other tale (8964).

Romita went on to draw a wide variety of horror comics, war comics, romance comics and other genres for Atlas. His most prominent work for the company was the short-lived 1950s revival of Timely's hit character Captain America, in Young Men #24–28 (December 1953 – July 1954) and Captain America #76–78 (May–September 1954). Romita had been offered the Captain America work by Lee after Mort Lawrence's art was deemed unsatisfactory. The character was billed now as "Captain America, Commie Smasher" in the wake of the Cold War and faced enemies associated with the Soviet Union. The series was a commercial failure, and was cancelled after just three issues. Romita attributed the series' failure to the changing political climate, particularly the public opposition to the Korean War; the character subsequently fell out of active publication for nearly a decade.

Additionally, Romita would render one of his first original characters, M-11 the Human Robot, in a five-page standalone science-fiction story in Menace #11 (May 1954). While not envisioned as an ongoing character, M-11 was resurrected decades later as a member of the super-hero team Agents of Atlas. Romita was the primary artist for one of the first series with a black star, "Waku, Prince of the Bantu"—created by writer Don Rico and artist Ogden Whitney in the omnibus title Jungle Tales #1 (September 1954). The ongoing short feature starred an African chieftain in Africa, with no regularly featured Caucasian characters. Romita succeeded Whitney with issue #2 (November 1954).

=== DC Comics romance-comics artist ===
In the mid-1950s, while continuing to freelance for Atlas, Romita did uncredited work for DC Comics. Romita had been recommended to DC's editors by his artist friend Carmine Infantino while serving in the Korean War. After declining comics sales in the late 1950s forced Atlas to let most of their artists go, Romita transitioned to work for DC exclusively in 1958. His first known work for the company is the tentatively identified penciling credit for the cover of romance comic Secret Hearts #58 (October 1959), and, confirmably, pencils for the seven-page story "I Know My Love", inked by Bernard Sachs in Heart Throbs #63 (January 1960). Other titles to which he contributed include Falling in Love, Girls' Love Stories, Girls' Romances, and Young Love.

Romita's artwork for these stories followed the house style for DC comics, and the first pages of his issues were often done by another artist. The cover art for romance comics was soon done primarily by Romita. He would "swipe"—an artists' term for using existing work as models, a common practice among novices—from movie stills and from the Milton Caniff comic strip Terry and the Pirates. Bernard Sachs and Sy Barry inked some of Romita's romance work, but Romita began inking his own pencils in the late 1950s or early 1960s. Romita had hoped a DC editor would eventually offer him a superhero comic, such as a Batman filler issue, but Romita remained on the romance titles.

Shortly afterward, however, romance comics began declining in popularity, and by 1965, DC had ceased buying art for new romance comics. The company then only used romance comics from their large inventory of previously unpublished comics or published reprints. Romita was not offered work by the other genre departments, although admitted he did not try to present himself to them either. Romita's last known DC story work was the six-page "My Heart Tricked Me", inked by Sachs, in Girls' Romances #121 (December 1966), though his spot illustrations, some or all of it reprints of earlier work, continued to appear on one-page "beauty tip" and other filler pages, as well as on letters pages, through early 1970, as did the occasional reprinted story.

=== Joining Marvel Comics ===
Even before his final original DC story was published, Romita had already returned to freelance for what had now become Marvel Comics. His first work for Marvel was inking Jack Kirby's cover and Don Heck's interior pencils on the superhero-team comic The Avengers #23 (December 1965).

Romita directed most of his efforts, however, toward finding advertising storyboard work. He obtained a position at the large ad agency BBDO through his friend Al Normandia, one of the firm's art directors. "They were going to pay me $250 a week. I'd made just over $200 a week with the romance [comics] but only by killing myself" with long hours of work. Struggling to find new ideas for comics, Romita decided he would only do inking for comic work again.

Marvel editor Stan Lee, however, had heard of Romita leaving DC, and asked to see him. At a three-hour meeting over lunch, Romita recalled that Lee promised to match the agency salary if Romita would come work for Marvel. Lee also assured him the freedom to choose his work location, allowing him to work either from home or the office on any given day, based on Romita's own preference. Romita had also received an offer to work in advertising, but chose Marvel instead because Lee had promised consistent assignments. Though Romita felt he no longer wanted to pencil, in favor of being solely an inker, Lee soon enticed him otherwise:

I had inked an Avengers job for Stan, and I told him I just wanted to ink. I felt like I was burned out as a penciler after eight years of romance work. I didn't want to pencil any more; in fact, I couldn't work at home any more—I couldn't discipline myself to do it. He said, "Okay," but the first chance he had he shows me this Daredevil story somebody had started and he didn't like it, and he wanted somebody else to do it. [He] showed me Dick Ayers' splash page for a Daredevil [and] asked me, 'What would you do with this page?' I showed him on a tracing paper what I would do, and then he asked me to do a drawing of Daredevil the way I would do it. I did a big drawing of Daredevil ... just a big, tracing-paper drawing of Daredevil swinging. And Stan loved it.

Romita began a brief stint on Daredevil beginning with issue #12 (January 1966), initially penciling over Jack Kirby's dynamic layouts as a means of learning Marvel's storytelling house style. Sales perked; while the title had a smaller print run than Marvel flagships The Amazing Spider-Man and Fantastic Four, it briefly had the company's highest percentage of sales compared to print-run. It also proved to be a stepping-stone for Romita's signature, years-long penciling run on The Amazing Spider-Man. During this time, a DC editor offered Romita to work on their Metamorpho character, but he declined. Lee wrote a two-part Daredevil story for issues #16–17 (May–June 1966) with Spider-Man guest starring, to see the character depicted by Romita.

=== Spider-Man ===
The reason for the tryout was the growing estrangement between Spider-Man co-creators Stan Lee and Steve Ditko. When Ditko abruptly left Marvel after completing The Amazing Spider-Man #38 (July 1966), Lee gave Romita the assignment. This followed Romita's eight-issue Daredevil run, the cover of the subsequent issue #20 (September 1966), and an incidental Hulk and two Captain America stories (in Tales to Astonish #77, March 1966, and Tales of Suspense #76–77, April–May 1966, respectively). The artist had trepidations:

I was hoping against it, believe it or not. People laugh when I say this, but I did not want to do Spider-Man. I wanted to stay on Daredevil. The only reason I did Spider-Man was because Stan asked me and I felt that I should help out, like a good soldier. I never really felt comfortable on Spider-Man for years. ... I felt obliged to [mimic] Ditko because ... I was convinced, in my own mind, that he was going to come back in two or three issues. ... I couldn't believe that a guy would walk away from a successful book that was the second-highest seller at Marvel. ... After six months, when I realized it wasn't temporary, I finally stopped trying to [mimic] Ditko. ... I was doing these nine-panel pages and the thin line, and I was doing Peter Parker without any bone structure—just like Ditko was doing, I thought.

Lee later commented that this transition in Romita's style actually worked out for the benefit of the series, as it gradually weaned readers off the Ditko look while ultimately allowing Romita to work in the style he most excelled at. Romita took over The Amazing Spider-Man with issue #39 (August 1966). His first inker on what would become Marvel's flagship series was Mike Esposito, who initially used the pseudonym "Mickey Demeo" to conceal from his regular employer, rival DC Comics, that he was moonlighting at Marvel. After three issues, Romita inked himself for issues #43–48 (November 1966 – May 1967), before Esposito returned—uncredited for issue #49 (June 1967), then as Mickey Demeo until finally taking credit under his own name with issue #56 (January 1968). Except for one issue (#65) inked by his successor, Jim Mooney, the Romita-Esposito team continued through issue #66 (November 1968), establishing the new look of Spider-Man. The Amazing Spider-Man had been Marvel's second-best-selling title at the time Romita began drawing it. Within a year, it overtook Fantastic Four to become the company's top seller.

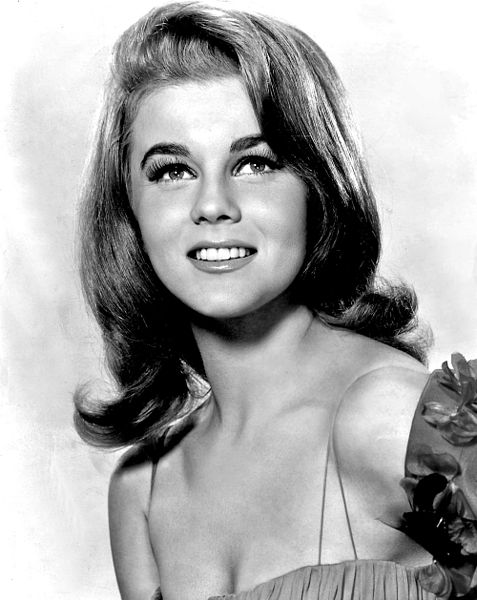
Romita based the design for Mary Jane Watson on the actress Ann-Margret.

Romita designed the look of Mary Jane Watson, a supporting character in the Spider-Man series who would later become the lead character's romantic interest. Romita has stated that in designing Mary Jane, he "used Ann-Margret from the movie Bye Bye Birdie as a guide, using her coloring, the shape of her face, her red hair and her form-fitting short skirts." Mary Jane Watson made her first full appearance in The Amazing Spider-Man #42 (November 1966), although she first appeared in #25 (June 1965) with her face obscured and had been mentioned since #15 (August 1964). Peter David wrote in 2010 that Romita "made the definitive statement of his arrival by pulling Mary Jane out from behind the oversized potted plant [that blocked the readers' view of her face in issue #25] and placing her on panel in what would instantly become an iconic moment." Other characters that debuted in the Lee-Romita era include the Rhino in #41 (October 1966), the Shocker in #46 (March 1967), the Kingpin in #50 (June 1967), and George Stacy in #56 (January 1968). Romita had based George Stacy on actor Charles Bickford. Lee and Romita's stories focused as much on the social and college lives of the characters as they did on Spider-Man's adventures. The stories became more topical, addressing issues such as the Vietnam War, political elections, and student activism.

Romita, increasingly called upon to do art corrections and touch-ups, and to interface with artists for ever-busy editor Lee, became Marvel's de facto art director. Cutting back on his Spider-Man workload, Romita began doing only layouts, with finished pencils by Don Heck or Jim Mooney for nearly every issue for a year-and-a-half (#57–75, February 1968 – August 1969). Romita then stepped back for six issues, drawing only covers while John Buscema laid out issues #76–81 (September 1969 – February 1970) for others to finish.

These steps at reducing Romita's Spider-Man workload had mixed results, Romita recalled in 2001, saying, "Stan was always trying to speed me up. He had Don Heck pencil over my breakdowns for a while. ... Then, when Don had finished the pencils, [Lee would] call me in to fix up anything ... that he didn't like. Even after it was inked, he'd have me changing what the inker had done. I told him, 'This was supposed to save me time, but it isn't!' ". Romita's initial run on the title, abetted by the three other artists, (Note: With issue #73, and then #76–81, Romita provided only covers and was absent from the inside, with Buscema providing layouts for penciler-inker Mooney. Romita returned with issue #82, doing layouts for Mooney to finish. Romita fully penciled the next issue, and then returned to layouts only, finished by Buscema, Mooney and Heck variously, through #87. He penciled the following issue himself. Gil Kane then penciled a four-issue stint with Romita inking and continuing to draw covers. Romita then finished his initial run penciling issues #93–95 (February–April 1971).) lasted through issue #95 (April 1971). Gil Kane succeeded him as Spider-Man's regular penciler through issue #105 (February 1972). Romita then began a second stint, doing full pencils for issues #105–115 and #119 (February–December 1972, April 1974), and providing occasional inking and most of the cover art through issue #168 (May 1977). Romita suggested to writer Gerry Conway that supporting character Gwen Stacy should die at the hands of the Green Goblin in "The Night Gwen Stacy Died" in issue #121 (June 1973). Her demise and the Goblin's apparent death one issue later formed a story arc widely considered as the most defining in the history of Spider-Man. In a June 2017 interview with SyFy Wire, Romita named The Amazing Spider-Man #108 and 109 as the two stories he was proudest of, explaining that by the time he did those issues, he was no longer invoking Steve Ditko, and was asserting his own style as an artist. Romita pointed to the Milton Caniff-inspired brushwork with which he rendered those pages, and lamented no longer owning the originals.

Comics-art historian Daniel Herman assessed of Romita's Spider-Man work:

Romita's transformation of the character redefined the character's look and took the strip in a different direction. It also made him a star artist in the comic book world. The trouble was, Romita took Spidey away from his roots and firmly planted him in the mainstream ... Marvel staffers would joke that Romita "took Spider-Man uptown". Romita reinvented the character and made it possible for [Spider-Man] to appeal to a wider audience, even if he removed the qualities that had made the strip a surreal standout.

Romita was the artist for the Spider-Man newspaper comic strip from its launch on January 3, 1977 through late 1980. He continued in his role as Marvel's art director during this time, anticipating that the strip would not last. Romita had promised Lee that he would continue the comic strip as long as sales continued to grow. The Spider-Man comic strip reached an audience of 500 newspapers, making it one of the most popular adventure comic strips at the time. At the start of the fourth year, the strip's number had begun to stagnate and then decline.

=== Marvel Comics art director ===
After editor-in-chief and art director Stan Lee assumed the positions of publisher and president in 1972, he promoted Romita to the position of art director in July 1973 after Romita had been in that position unofficially but on staff since 1972. In that capacity through at least the late 1980s, Romita played a major role in defining the look of Marvel Comics and in designing new characters. Among the characters he designed or helped design are the Punisher, Wolverine, Luke Cage, Bullseye, Tigra, and Brother Voodoo. Romita's catlike design for Wolverine was based on an encyclopedia description he found on wolverines, as vicious short animals with claws. For the Punisher, a rough sketch was provided by writer Gerry Conway, with a skull and crossbones on the chest. Feeling this was too simple, Romita made the skull larger to encompass the Punisher's torso, with his belt buckle resembling teeth. Romita also designed Natasha Romanova's Black Widow outfit, inspired by Miss Fury.

Romita collaborated with The Electric Company and to produce Spidey Super Stories comics, which were aimed at a younger audience and created with help from child psychologists. The series had 57 comics produced between 1974 and 1982. Romita created another program called "Romita's Raiders", which allowed young artists to gain hands-on experience and learn from the art staff at Marvel.

In 1976, Romita did uncredited art corrections on the large-format, first DC/Marvel intercompany crossover, Superman vs. the Amazing Spider-Man, over the pencils of Ross Andru. Later that same year, Romita inked Jack Kirby's pencil work on Captain America's Bicentennial Battles, a one-shot story published in an oversized treasury format. Around 1980, Romita's art directing duties expanded from comic books to special projects. His duties included supervising and hiring other artists, providing corrections and cover sketches when needed, and drawing art for various merchandise.

Romita's cover for the April 27 – May 3, 2002, issue of TV Guide

=== Later career ===
Romita inked the debut of new Captain Marvel Monica Rambeau in The Amazing Spider-Man Annual #16 (1982) and the first appearance of the Hobgoblin in The Amazing Spider-Man #238 (March 1983). He was one of six pencilers on Peter Parker, the Spectacular Spider-Man #121 (December 1986), and he penciled the nine-page story "I Remember Gwen" in The Amazing Spider-Man #365 (August 1992, the 30th-anniversary issue) and an eight-page backup story starring the hero and supporting character the Prowler in Peter Parker, the Spectacular Spider-Man Annual #13 (1993). In 1996, Romita announced his semi-retirement, but continued to work on multiple comics projects.

Romita both penciled and inked the 10-page backup story "The Kiss"—a flashback in which Peter Parker (Spider-Man) and his girlfriend Gwen Stacy share their first kiss—in Webspinners: Tales of Spider-Man #1 (January 1999). He drew an alternate-universe version of the Spider-Man characters in the one-shot Spidey: A Universe X Special (2001), and penciled the final four pages of the 38-page story in the milestone The Amazing Spider-Man #500 (December 2003) together with his son John Jr. penciling the other pages. Romita drew one of four covers to the April 27 – May 3, 2002, issue of TV Guide to promote the release of the 2002 Spider-Man film.

In the early 2000s, Romita contributed to multi-artist jams in commemorative issues. He did a panel in Captain America vol. 3, #50 (February 2002), starring the first Marvel superhero he had drawn; a portion of Iron Man vol. 3, #40 (May 2001), although the hero was not one of the artist's signature characters; a panel for Daredevil vol. 2, #50 (October 2003); and a few pages featuring Karen Page in Daredevil vol. 2, #100 (October 2007), done in the style of the romance comics he had drawn decades earlier. Romita both penciled and inked the cover of Daredevil vol. 2, #94 (February 2007) in that same romance comics style. The following year he drew a variant cover of his signature series, for The Amazing Spider-Man #568 (October 2008), doing so again with #642 (November 2010).

A Romita image of Spider-Man and a Hulk image penciled by Rich Buckler and inked by Romita were among the "Marvel Super Heroes" set of commemorative stamps issued by the U.S. Postal Service on July 27, 2007.

As of 2013, he served on the Disbursement Committee of the comic-book industry charity The Hero Initiative.

== Awards ==
Romita received an Inkpot Award in 1979, and was inducted into the Will Eisner Award Hall of Fame in 2002. Romita was inducted into the Inkwell Awards Joe Sinnott Hall of Fame in 2020.

== Personal life ==
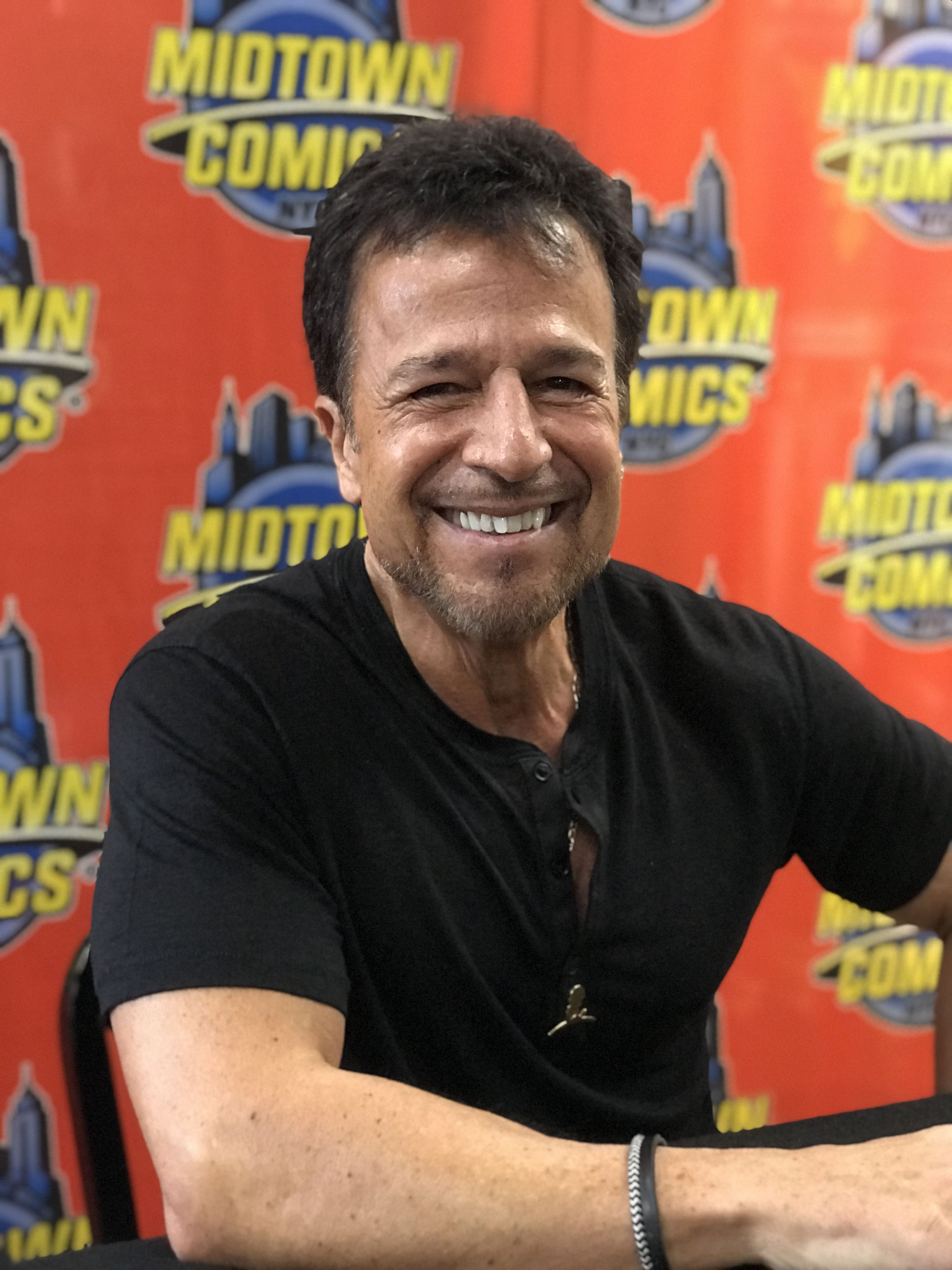
John Romita Jr. in 2019

John Romita Sr. married childhood sweetheart Virginia Bruno in November 1952, who also worked on staff at Marvel as traffic manager from 1975 to 1996. They lived in Brooklyn's Bensonhurst neighborhood until 1954, when they bought a house in the Queens neighborhood of Queens Village. Some years later, the family moved to Bellerose, New York, on Long Island.

Romita and his wife had two sons, Victor and John Jr. (born August 17, 1956), who followed in his footsteps to become a noted comic-book artist himself. At the time of his death, Romita had three grandchildren and one great-granddaughter.

== Death ==
Romita died in his sleep at his home in Floral Park, New York, on June 12, 2023, at the age of 93. The news was broken by his son, John Jr., the following day.

== Artistic style ==
Romita has been credited with creating a new Spider-Man art style with romance and adventure influences that appealed to an even wider audience. He drew a more handsome Peter Parker and beautiful women, and depicted "beautiful suffering" that combined soap opera and fantasy themes. The Romita have been described as "The artist's line work became more rounded, and his depiction of women in particular became a real strength that would sustain him in years to come. His women were described as "fair of face but realistic rather than stylized" and displayed distinctive personalities through body language. Comic artist Alex Ross has stated, "For me, John's Spidey is a design of such perfection and beauty so as to be simply the greatest-looking character in comics, by his hand."

While working on DC's romance comics, Romita, finding the stories dull and repetitive, began looking for ways to add more personality into the artwork. For example, Romita would add flowing hair on women or objects moving in the wind for panels that had little happening and depicting characters from unique angles. After moving to Marvel, Romita was known for drawing stylistic deep shadows and defined bone structure.

== Bibliography ==
=== DC Comics ===
- DC 100 Page Super Spectacular #5 (1971)
- Falling in Love #20, 25, 31, 35, 44, 50, 53–55, 59, 70, 81 (full art); #22 (inks over Tony Abruzzo) (1958–1966)
- Girls' Love Stories #52–53, 82–88, 90–94, 96, 99, 101, 116, 120, 138, 140, 162, 165, 170 (full art); #52, 58, 65 (inks over Mike Sekowsky); #95, 97–98 (inks over Werner Roth) (1958–1972)
- Girls' Romances #23, 62, 76, 85–86, 89–93, 95, 114, 121, 129, 159–160 (full art); #60, 86 (inks over Mike Sekowsky); #85, 94 (inks over Werner Roth) (1953–1971)
- Heart Throbs #63, 65–67, 77–86, 90, 93, 99, 101 (1959–1966)
- Secret Hearts #43, 60, 69–70, 78–93, 109, 152–153 (full art); #55, 61 (inks over Tony Abruzzo) (1957–1971)
- Young Love #39–43, 45–54 (1963–1966)
- Young Romance #125–128, 130–132, 171–172, 175 (1963–1971)

=== Marvel Comics ===
- Adventures into Weird Worlds #21 (1953)
- All-True Crime #44 (1951)
- The Amazing Spider-Man #39–58, 67, 72, 82–83, 87–88, 93–95, 106–119, 132, 365, 500 Annual '96 #1 (full art); #89–92, 96, 120–124 (inks over Gil Kane); #125, 146, 151 (inks over Ross Andru); #238, 247, 400, Annual #16 (inks over John Romita Jr.); 274 (inks over Tom Morgan and James Fry) (1966–2003) (Romita drew additional Silver Age issues as layout artist for pencilers Don Heck and Jim Mooney.)
- The Amazing Spider-Man vol. 2, #18 (inks over John Byrne) (2000)
- The Amazing Spider-Man Special Edition (1982)
- The Amazing Spider-Man comic strip (1977–1980)
- Astonishing #7, 18, 24, 43, 57, 61 (1951–1957)
- The Avengers #23 (inks over Don Heck) (1965)
- Battle #14, 26, 39, 45, 49, 53, 57–59 (1952–1958)
- Battle Action #20, 22, 25, 27, 29 (1955–1957)
- Battlefront #6, 10 (1952–1953)
- Battle Ground #9 (1956)
- Black Knight #4 (1955)
- Captain America #114, 138–144 (full art); #145 (inks over Gil Kane); #148 (inks over Sal Buscema) (1969–1972)
- Captain America vol. 3 #50 (among other artists) (2002)
- Captain America Comics #76–78 (1954)
- Caught #2 (1956)
- Combat #3, 6 (1952)
- Commando Adventures #2 (1957)
- Cowboy Action #10 (1956)
- Crime Cases Comics #7 (1951)
- Crime Exposed #5 (1951)
- Daredevil #12–19 (1966)
- Daredevil vol. 2 #50, 100 (among other artists) (2003–2007)
- Doctor Strange vol. 2 #7 (inks over Gene Colan) (1975)
- Droids #1–4 (1986)
- Fantastic Four #103–106, 108 (1970–1971)
- Frontier Western #7 (1957)
- Gunsmoke Western #38 (1956)
- The Incredible Hulk Annual #17 (1991)
- Journey into Unknown Worlds #22 (1953)
- Jungle Action #2–6 (1954–1955)
- Justice #42 (1954)
- Kid Colt Outlaw #70 (1957)
- Kingpin #1 (1997)
- Lorna, the Jungle Girl #17–26 (1956–1957)
- Love Romances #35, 37 (1954)
- Marines in Battle #3–4, 19 (1954–1957)
- Marvel Presents: Guardians of the Galaxy #3 (inker, Cover Art) (February 1976)
- Marvel Romance Redux: But I Thought He Loved Me #1 (inks over John Buscema) (2006)
- Marvel Romance Redux: Guys & Dolls #1 (inks over John Buscema) (2006)
- Marvel Romance Redux: Love is a Four-Letter Word #1 (2006)
- Marvel Tales #108 (1952)
- Marvel Tales vol. 2 #81 (1977)
- Marvel Treasury Special #2 ("Captain America's Bicentennial Battles") (inks over Jack Kirby) (1976)
- Men's Adventures #22, 24, 28 (1953–1954)
- Menace #3, 6, 8, 11 (1953–1954)
- My Love #1–2, 14 (full art); #2–3 (inks over John Buscema); #16 (inks over Steve Englehart) (1969–1972)
- My Love Story #9 (1957)
- My Own Romance #36, 40 (1954)
- Mystery Tales #7, 37, 41 (1953–1956)
- Mystic #11, 15, 23, 25 (1952–1953)
- Navy Action #5 (1955)
- Navy Combat #12 (1957)
- Our Love Story #1–2 (inks over John Buscema); #5 (inks over Gene Colan) (1969–1970)
- Outlaw Kid #5 (1955)
- Questprobe #1 (inks over Mark Gruenwald) (1984)
- Ringo Kid #11 (1956)
- Savage Tales (Femizons) #1 (1971)
- Secret Story Romances #16, 18 (1955)
- Sergio Aragonés Massacres Marvel #1 (inks over Sergio Aragonés) (1996)
- Six-Gun Western #1, 4 (1957)
- Spaceman #1 (1953)
- The Spectacular Spider-Man #121, Annual #13 (1986–1993)
- The Spectacular Spider-Man magazine #1–2 (1968)
- Spellbound #13, 24, 26–28 (1953–1956)
- Spider-Man #57 (inks over John Romita Jr.) (1995)
- Spider-Man/Kingpin: To the Death Oneshot (1997)
- Spider-Man: The Mutant Agenda #0 (1994)
- Spy Cases #5 (1951)
- Stories of Romance #5, 11 (1956–1957)
- Strange Tales #4, 35 (1951–1955)
- Strange Tales of the Unusual #1 (1955)
- Suspense #20, 25 (1952)
- Tales of Suspense (Captain America) #76–77 (1966)
- Tales to Astonish #67 (Giant Man) (inks over Bob Powell); #77 (Hulk) (inks over Jack Kirby) (1965–1966)
- The Tomb of Dracula magazine #2 (inks over Frank Robbins) (1979)
- True Secrets #4, 13, 38 (1951–1956)
- Two Gun Western #8 (inks over Les Zakarin) (1951)
- Ultimate Spider-Man Super Special #1 (2002)
- Uncanny Tales #10 (1953)
- Uncanny X-Men #177 (inks over John Romita Jr.) (1984)
- Universe X: Spidey #1 (inks over Jackson Guice) (2001)
- Untold Tales of Spider-Man #-1 (1997)
- Vampire Tales #2 (also inks over Jesus Blasco) (1973)
- War Action #10–11 (1953)
- War Adventures #7, 9 (1952)
- War Comics #10, 16, 20, 29, 40, 42 (1952–1956)
- Web of Spider-Man #52 (inks over Frank Springer) (1989)
- Webspinners: Tales of Spider-Man #1 (1999)
- Western Kid #1–17 (1954–1957)
- Western Outlaws #1, 7, 11, 13–14 (1954–1956)
- Western Outlaws and Sheriffs #70 (1951)
- Wild Western #24 (1952)
- World of Mystery #2 "(1956)
- World of Suspense #5 (1956)
- Young Men #24–28 (Captain America) (1953–1954)

=== Marvel Comics and DC Comics ===
- Superman vs. the Amazing Spider-Man #1 (1976)

== Notes ==
Preceded by Bob Powell and Wally Wood	Daredevil artist 1966	Succeeded by Gene Colan
Preceded by Jack Kirby	Tales of Suspense ("Captain America" feature) artist 1966	Succeeded by Jack Kirby
Preceded by Steve Ditko	The Amazing Spider-Man artist 1966–1970	Succeeded by Gil Kane
Preceded by Jack Kirby	Fantastic Four artist 1970–1971	Succeeded by John Buscema
Preceded by Gene Colan	Captain America artist 1971–1971	Succeeded by Sal Buscema
Preceded by Gil Kane	The Amazing Spider-Man artist 1972–1973	Succeeded by Ross Andru
