= Oh, Jeff...I Love You, Too...But... =

Painting by Roy Lichtenstein

- Artist: Roy Lichtenstein
- Year: 1964
- Movement: Pop art
- Dimensions: 121.9 cm × 121.9 cm (48 in × 48 in)
- Location: Private collection

Oh, Jeff...I Love You, Too...But... (sometimes Oh, Jeff) is a 1964 oil and magna on canvas painting by Roy Lichtenstein. Like many of Lichtenstein's works, its title comes from the speech balloon in the painting.

Although many sources, such as the Encyclopedia of Art, describe Whaam! and Drowning Girl as Lichtenstein's most famous works, artist Vian Shamounki Borchert believes it is this piece, calling it his Mona Lisa. Borchert notes that this painting captures "the magic" of its "anguished and yes [sic] beautiful blue-eyed, blond hair, full lips" female subject while presenting "sad eyes that seem to give in to what seems to be a doomed love affair".

Measuring 121.9 cm × 121.9 cm (48 in × 48 in), Oh, Jeff...I Love You, Too...But... is among the most famous of his early romance comic derivative works from the period when he was adapting cartoons and advertisements into his style via Ben-Day dots. The work is said to depict the classic romance comic storyline of temporary adversity.

Lichtenstein adapted the work from a comic illustrated by Tony Abruzzo; the panel's actual text reads, "Oh, Danny, I'm so sorry! I would have loved to go but I'm going to another party that night!" Lichtenstein's sketch for the work was done in graphite and colored pencils on paper in a 4 3/4 x 4 3/4 inches (12.1 x 12.1 cm) scale.

In the early 1960s, Lichtenstein produced several "fantasy drama" paintings of women in love affairs with domineering men causing women to be miserable, such as Drowning Girl, Hopeless and In the Car. These works served as prelude to 1964 paintings of innocent "girls next door" in a variety of tenuous emotional states such as in Oh, Jeff...I Love You, Too...But.... Using only a single frame from its source, Oh, Jeff...I Love You, Too...But...'s graphics are quite indicative of frustration, but the text in the speech balloon augment the romantic context and the emotional discord. After 1963, Lichtenstein's comics-based women "...look hard, crisp, brittle, and uniformly modish in appearance, as if they all came out of the same pot of makeup." This particular example is one of several that is cropped so closely that the hair flows beyond the edges of the canvas. This was painted at the apex of Lichtenstein's use of enlarged dots, cropping and magnification of the original source. The tragic situations of his subjects makes his works a popular draw at museums.

Oh, Jeff was sold for $210,000 (US$821,000 in 2025 dollars) on May 15, 1980, at Sotheby's, New York. At the time, the work was part of the Abrams family collection. As of February 3, 1994, the Los Angeles Times reported that it was part of the Stefan Edlis Collection.

== See also ==
- 1964 in art
