= We Rose Up Slowly =

Painting by Roy Lichtenstein

- Artist: Roy Lichtenstein
- Year: 1964
- Medium: Acrylic, oil, and pencil on canvas (two panels)
- Movement: Pop art
- Location: Museum für Moderne Kunst, Frankfurt am Main, Germany

We Rose Up Slowly is a 1964 painting by Roy Lichtenstein. Its materials consist of oil and magna on two canvas panels. The painting measures 68 inches (170 cm) x 92 inches (230 cm). It was previously exhibited at the Art Institute of Chicago and Centre Pompidou. It is currently in the collection of the Museum für Moderne Kunst.

== Description ==
Laura Barnett of The Guardian wrote that the painting depicts "two all-American archetypes — a handsome man, a luscious blonde — in a steamy embrace." The painting is adapted from a panel in the romance comic Girls' Romances #81 (National Periodical, Jan. 1962).

== See also ==
- 1964 in art
