= Girls' Romances =

Romance comic book series

Publication information
- Publisher: DC Comics
- Schedule: Bi-monthly, monthly
- Format: Ongoing
- Genre: Romance
- Publication date: Feb./March 1950 — Oct. 1971
- No. of issues: 160

Creative team
- Artist(s): Mike Sekowsky, Tony Abruzzo, Gene Colan, Lee Elias, Gil Kane, Win Mortimer, Bob Oksner, John Romita, Sr., John Rosenberger, Art Saaf, Jack Sparling, Alex Toth, George Tuska

Girls' Romances is a romance comic anthology published by DC Comics in the United States. Debuting with a Feb.,/Mar. 1950 cover-date, it ran for 160 issues, ending with the Oct. 1971 issue (the final issue came out on October 3, 1971, and sold for $0.25).

Mike Sekowsky was a regular artist on the book from 1952 to the end of its run. Other artists on the title included Tony Abruzzo, Gene Colan, Lee Elias, Gil Kane, Win Mortimer, Bob Oksner, John Romita, Sr., John Rosenberger, Art Saaf, Jack Sparling, Alex Toth, and George Tuska. Nick Cardy drew many covers.

Pop artist Roy Lichtenstein based a number of his works on panels from Girls' Romances, including In the Car (sometimes called Driving) (1963), We Rose Up Slowly (1964), and Sleeping Girl (1964).
