= I Know...Brad =

1964 painting by Roy Lichtenstein

- Artist: Roy Lichtenstein
- Year: 1964
- Movement: Pop art
- Dimensions: 174 cm × 95.9 cm (68.5 in × 37.75 in)
- Location: Ludwig Forum für Internationale Kunst; Aachen

I Know...Brad (sometimes I Know How You Must Feel, Brad) is a 1964 pop art painting by Roy Lichtenstein that uses his classic Ben-Day dots and a speech balloon. The work is located at the Ludwig Forum für Internationale Kunst in Aachen. It is an example of how Lichtenstein used his artistry to make significant changes to the original comics sources, in this case a panel by comic artist Ted Galino.

== Background ==
Lichtenstein stated that the name Brad sounded heroic to him and was used with the aim of clichéd oversimplification.

== Background ==
Source comic of this portrait

Ellen H. Johnson says that I Know...Brad descends from Ingres' Portrait of Madame Moitessier

Measuring 174 cm × 95.9 cm (68.5 in × 37.75 in), I Know...Brad is considered an ironic depiction of emotional expression. The work is a three-quarter-length, single image of a lovelorn girl. This is one of Lichtenstein's post-1963 comics-based women that "...look hard, crisp, brittle, and uniformly modish in appearance, as if they all came out of the same pot of makeup."

== Details ==
According to a reproduction of Ellen H. Johnson's article entitled "Lichtenstein and the Printed Image" from Art and Artists (London, June 1966) the painting is somewhat removed from the original, while satirically mimicking several elements of it:

The slick black contours in I Know How You Must Feel, Brad wittily parody the crazy 'grace' of the pointed fingers, narrow wrist, swelling hips and breast and the flowing blonde hair of the comic. But for all the mannerism in Lichtenstein's American beauty (who numbers Ingres' Madame Moitessier among her ancestors), the total work is a powerful, commanding painting at least as far removed from the original comic as Seurat's paintings are from Chéret's posters.

— Sources,

Johnson notes how Lichtenstein transforms the comic inspiration not only by enlarging the scale, but he also by eliminating non-essential details such as fingernails and traces of forearm musculature. In addition, by varying and reducing the number of lines he presents a better depiction of their character. His color change makes the work more dynamic and the subject more idealized. He also makes the landscape background more robust. Lichtenstein stated that the name Brad sounded heroic to him and was used with the aim of clichéd oversimplification. The work presents an "...unmistakeable acknowledgement to the flamboyant linearism of Art Nouveau...".

== See also ==
- 1964 in art
