= Ira Schnapp =

Austrian-American graphic designer

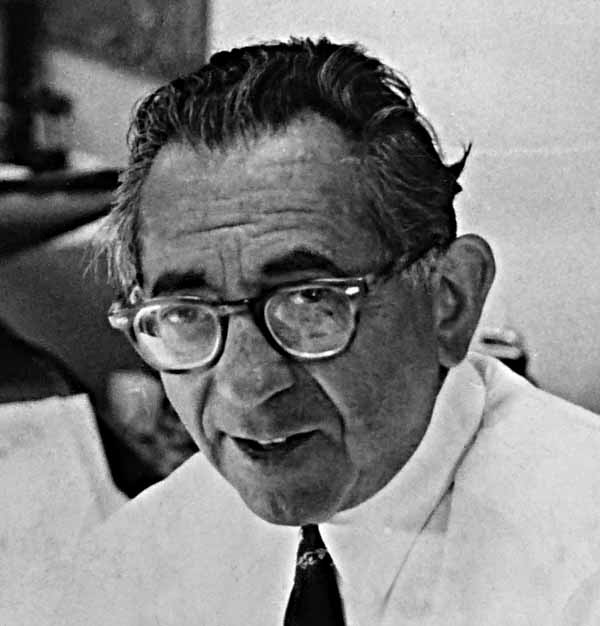
- Schnapp in 1955, at his desk in the National (DC) Comics offices
- Born: Israel Schnapp; October 10, 1894 Sassow, Kingdom of Galicia and Lodomeria, Austro-Hungarian Empire (now Sasiv, Ukraine)
- Died: July 24, 1969 (age 74) New York City, New York
- Areas: Letterer, Designer
- Notable works: Superman logo redesign (1940), DC Comics house style in logos, cover lettering and in-house advertising (1950–1967)

Ira Schnapp (October 10, 1894 – July 24, 1969) was a logo designer and letterer who brought his classic and art deco design styles to DC Comics (then National Comics) beginning with the redesign of the Superman logo in 1940. He did a great deal of logo and lettering work for the company in the 1940s. Around 1949, he joined the staff as their in-house logo, cover lettering and house-ad designer and letterer, and continued in that role until about 1967.

== Life and career ==
=== Early life and immigration ===
Schnapp was born in the small town of Sassow, then in the Kingdom of Galicia and Lodomeria, part of the Austro-Hungarian Empire. After World War II that area became part of Ukraine, and the town is now known as Sasiv. He was one of eight children, five born in Austria, three born after the family regrouped in New York City. Ira's father Max emigrated in 1895 and established himself in a grocery business. His oldest son Jacob followed in 1898. The rest of the family — mother Sadie, and sons Samuel, Joseph, Israel (Ira), and Moses — followed in 1900. Daughters Lena, Sara and Minnie were born in New York. The Schnapp family lived at 86 Ludlow Street in lower Manhattan, and Ira and his siblings probably attended New York's Public School #188. Ira definitely attended New York City's Stuyvesant High School, graduating in June 1913. Nothing specific is known about his art training. Ira's occupation is listed as Salesman in the New York State Census of 1915, and his family was then living in The Bronx. On September 30, 1918, he married Beatrice Schwadron. By 1920 the couple were living in their own home in The Bronx.

=== Architectural design, film titles, lobby cards, and pulp magazines ===
Little evidence has surfaced about Schnapp's early work during and after leaving school, but late in his life he often talked about helping to design the very large carved inscriptions on the façade of the James A. Farley Post Office Building on Manhattan's Eighth Avenue between 31st and 33rd Streets, constructed from 1908 to 1912. He was probably part of a design team working for the architects McKim, Mead and White. His role was making huge full-size tissue layouts of the letters, which are in the style of Rome's Trajan's Column, as drawn on the architectural plans by the architects. The tissues served as a guide for the stonecutters carving the letters on marble blocks. Schnapp later showed some of these tissue layouts to artist Neal Adams. He may have done similar work for inscriptions on other monumental buildings of the time like the New York Public Library Main Branch at Fifth Avenue and 42nd Street. How Schnapp became involved in this high-profile design job is unknown.

By 1917, Schnapp was doing lettering for the W.T. Slide Company of 115 East 23rd Street in Manhattan, according to his World War I draft card. This work was probably used as title and/or intertitle cards in silent films. Nothing is known of his output during the 1920s, but by the 1930s, Schnapp was doing show card lettering for movie theater lobbies, including huge displays for the premiere of King Kong at Radio City Music Hall in 1933, and many others.

Schnapp probably did all kinds of show card, print and advertising logos and lettering in the 1930s, including logos for pulp magazines being published by Harry Donenfeld and Jack Liebowitz. Schnapp was related to Liebowitz by marriage, and though there are no records of his work in the pulps, style similarities suggest he was working for the Donenfeld pulps by 1934.

=== The Art of the Ages ===
Ira and Beatrice Schnapp had two children: daughter Theresa, born in 1922, and a son, Martin, born in 1930. In the 1930 census Schnapp's occupation is given as Artist. By the early 1930s, Schnapp and his extended family and siblings had relocated to Manhattan's Upper West Side around 110th Street.

With his own family now numbering four, Schnapp looked for ways to increase his income. He began work on a project he hoped would become a syndicated newspaper feature. Called The Art of the Ages, each entry featured a famous work of art, either a painting or sculpture, reproduced in pen, ink, and textured shading, with a small portrait of the artist, and descriptive text. The only known publication of the series was in the Toledo Blade of Toledo, Ohio. Twenty-four entries were published from January 23 to July 2, 1940. No syndication information is included in any entry, and the project was not a success. The feature is the only known time Ira Schnapp received a newspaper byline.

=== The Superman Logo ===
By 1940, Donenfeld and Liebowitz, now in control of National Comics, were the dominant figures in comic book publishing. Their most popular character was Superman, who debuted in Action Comics #1 in 1938. Superman gained his own title with Superman #1 in the summer of 1939, featuring cover art and logo by Joe Shuster. Shuster redrew the logo for each subsequent issue, leading to a very inconsistent look. Schnapp was brought in to redesign the Superman logo. His version first appeared on the cover of Superman #6, dated Sept.-Oct. 1940. Based on Shuster's ideas, Schnapp gave the logo professional polish and correct perspective, greatly improving it. It was used on all Superman merchandise thereafter until another redesign in 1983, a very long run of 43 years. Schnapp is often credited with designing the Action Comics logo in 1938, but he later told a young fan, Michael Uslan (now a comics professional and movie producer) that the Superman logo redesign was his first work for the company. The designer of the original Action Comics logo remains unknown.

=== DC Comics freelance work ===
The Superman logo redesign began a relationship with DC Comics that lasted the rest of Schnapp's working life. His son Martin remembers him often working on lettering for interior pages at home, beginning in the early 1940s. By 1946, many stories lettered by Schnapp can be found, especially on the company's humor titles, though he worked on all kinds of stories, including those with superheroes. Schnapp also created more logos for DC, including most of their new titles from 1947 on, such as radio show-based titles like A Date With Judy, Gang Busters, and Mr. District Attorney. Perhaps his best-known logo from this period debuted on the first issue of Superboy, dated March–April 1949.

=== DC Comics staff position ===
Around 1949, Schnapp took a staff position at National (DC) Comics, working in their production department at 480 Lexington Avenue every day. Schnapp may have been the company's first staff letterer. His main task was to produce nearly all the logos, cover lettering and in-house advertising, as well as lettering story pages when he had time. By doing so, Schnapp set the style for the entire company, producing a huge amount of work that caught the imagination of readers and kept them coming back for more. Dozens of logos for books like The Flash, Justice League of America, Green Lantern, The Atom, Hawkman, and Metal Men brought Schnapp's classic and art deco styles to the newsstand. His cover lettering and house ads were full of excitement, encouraging children to buy the comics. Despite the great volume of work he was doing, Schnapp did not receive credit, except on two issues of The Inferior Five in 1967, near the end of his career. While readers loved his work, its creator remained unknown.

=== DC house ads ===
Beginning around 1950, Schnapp designed and hand-lettered hundreds of DC house ads. These ads ran across the entire line, with text by editors like Mort Weisinger and Julius Schwartz. Fans were intrigued by Schnapp's titles, such as "Coming Super-Attractions!" for the Superman titles, "Just Imagine!" for Justice League of America, and "Just One Second!" for The Flash. Schnapp may not have written those words, but his lettering made them exciting.

=== Lettering ===
Schnapp lettered comics stories of every kind for DC Comics beginning in the early 1940s, including humor, funny animals, romance, western, characters licensed from movies and TV shows, and super-heroes. He also produced lettering for the Superman and Batman comic strips. Despite his brilliance as a logo and title designer, in the words of comics historian Kirk Kimball, "Schnapp's word-balloon lettering was ... surprisingly pedestrian." By comparison, his balloon lettering for covers was more polished and precise, but still often sedate. Pop artist Roy Lichtenstein used the splash page of a romance story lettered by Schnapp in Secret Hearts #83 (November 1962) as the basis for one of Lichtenstein's most iconic works. Lichtenstein slightly reworked the art and dialogue, and re-lettered Schnapp's original word balloon. Drowning Girl (1963) is now part of the permanent collection of the Museum of Modern Art, New York.

The Comics Code seal, designed by Schnapp.

=== Comics Code Authority seal ===
In 1955, with changes brought about by Dr. Fredric Wertham and the adoption of the Comics Code, Schnapp designed the Comics Code Authority seal, which became a fixture on comic book covers for over forty years.

=== Retirement and death ===
In 1966-67, Carmine Infantino was appointed as DC's art director, and then editorial director. In a major shake-up, Infantino transitioned to Gaspar Saladino as the new main logo and house-ad designer and cover letterer for the entire line of comics. Long-time DC writer Marv Wolfman recalled that "DC kept Ira employed doing miscellaneous things around the production department because ... management felt they owed him for all his great work." Schnapp was retired by the company in 1968. Artist Neal Adams, who had befriended Schnapp when he started working at DC around 1967, said it meant Schnapp was being sent home to die. Gaspar Saladino, who had begun working on staff at DC in 1949, not long after Schnapp, called Schnapp "Mr. DC," and said "It was sad that when he left it was as though he'd never been there at all."

Schnapp's son Marty remembers his father dying suddenly of a heart attack on July 24, 1969. He died at St. Luke's Hospital on 113th Street, New York, not far from his long-time home. A brief New York Times obituary ran on July 26, 1969. There was no mention of his death at age 74 by DC Comics, and it seems to have gone unnoticed in the comics world. Schnapp's wife Beatrice died in 1977, and his daughter Theresa (Teddy) died in 2009. As of 2015, his son Marty was alive and working in New York City.

Several members of Ira Schnapp's family and extended family were also involved in the comics business. His brother Solomon married Faye Liebowitz, the sister of Jack Liebowitz, the co-owner of National (DC) Comics. One of their sons was Jay (Schnapp) Emmett, who began as a National employee and worked his way up to President of Warner Communications. Solomon and Faye's daughter Carol married Irwin Donenfeld, son of the other owner of National Comics, Harry Donenfeld. Schnapp was more closely related to Fred Iger, head of the American Comics Group. Iger was the son of Schnapp's sister Lee, making him Schnapp's nephew.

== Quotes ==
Mark Evanier, on the Superman logo:

It's probably the best logo ever designed for a comic book, and maybe for anything, anywhere.

Kirk Kimball of Dial B for Blog:

Readers — designers — look upon the work of Ira Schnapp, and despair! You will never surpass it! You will never equal it! You will never even come close to it! Try to imagine a world where Schnapp's work never existed ... It simply can't be done, because Schnapp's designs are inextricably woven into the very fabric of American pop culture. That is a legacy most designers can only dream of.

== Exhibitions ==
In 2015, the Type Directors Club of New York City hosted a retrospective exhibition of Schnapp's work, "The Super Type of Ira Schnapp", curated by Arlen Schumer.
