= Benjamin Day =

Benjamin Day or Ben Day may refer to:

== Publishing ==
- Benjamin Henry Day (1810–1889), American illustrator and printer; founder of the original New York Sun
- Benjamin Henry Day Jr. (1838–1916), American illustrator and printer
- The Ben Day process, printing technology invented by Benjamin Henry Day Jr.

== Other ==
- Benjamin Day (cyclist) (born 1978), Australian professional road racing cyclist
- Benjamin M. Day, 11th director of Ellis Island, from 1926 to 1931

== See also ==
- Day (surname)
