= A Tramp Abroad =

Work of travel literature by Mark Twain

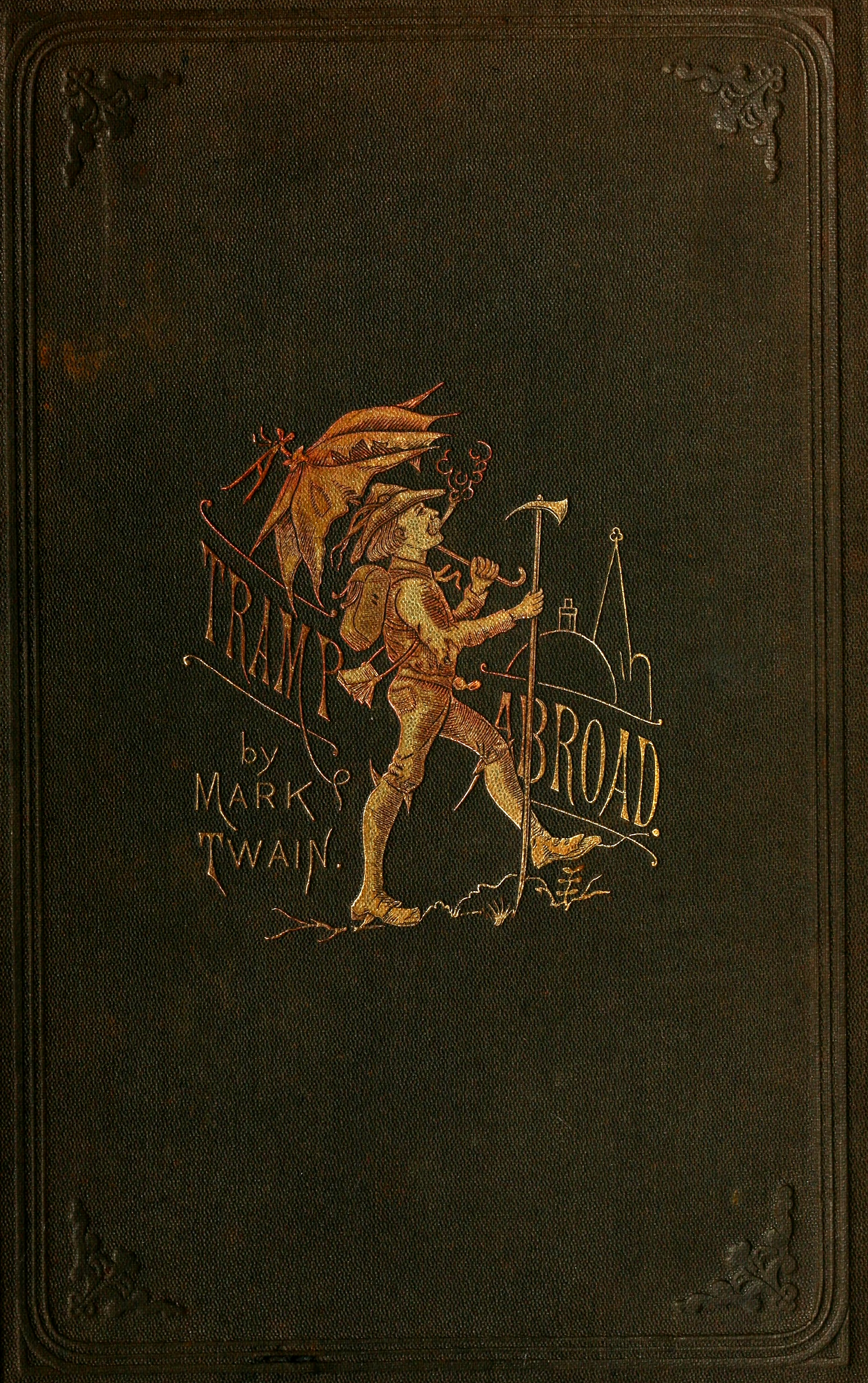
- First edition
- Author: Mark Twain
- Illustrator: Walter Francis Brown, True W. Williams, Benjamin Henry Day Jr., William Wallace Denslow, James Mahoney, Mark Twain, and others.
- Language: English
- Genre: Travel literature
- Set in: Germany, Switzerland, France, Italy; 1870s
- Publisher: American Publishing Company
- Publication date: 1880
- Publication place: United States
- Media type: Print
- Pages: 649
- Text: A Tramp Abroad at Wikisource

A Tramp Abroad is a work of travel literature, including a mixture of autobiography and fictional events, by American author Mark Twain, published in 1880. The book details a journey by the author, with his friend Harris (a character created for the book, and based on his closest friend, Joseph Twichell), through central and southern Europe. While the stated goal of the journey is to walk most of the way, the men find themselves using other forms of transport as they traverse the continent. The book is the fourth of Mark Twain's six travel books published during his lifetime and is often thought to be an unofficial sequel to the first one, The Innocents Abroad (1869).

As the two men make their way through Germany, the Alps, and Italy, they encounter situations made all the more humorous by their reactions to them. The narrator (Twain) plays the part of the American tourist of the time, believing that he understands all that he sees, but in reality understanding none of it.

== Plot ==
The first half of the book covers their stay in south-western Germany (Heidelberg, Mannheim, a trip on the Neckar river, Baden-Baden and the Black Forest). The second part describes his travels through Switzerland and eastern France (Lucerne, Interlaken, Zermatt, Chamonix and Geneva). The end of the book covers his trip through several cities in northern Italy (Milan, Venice and Rome). Several other cities are touched and described during their travels, as well as mountains such as Matterhorn, the Jungfrau, the Rigi-Kulm and Mont-Blanc.

Interleaved with the narration, Mark Twain inserted stories not related to the trip, such as Bluejay Yarn, The Man who put up at Gadsby's and others; as well as many German Legends, some invented by the author himself.

Six appendices are included in the book. They are short essays dedicated to different topics. The role of The Portier in European hotels and how they make their living, a description of Heidelberg Castle, an essay on College Prisons in Germany, "The Awful German Language", a humorous essay on German language, a short story called "The Legend of the Castle" and a satirical description of German newspapers.

== Illustrations ==
The book contains ca. 328 illustrations, which contribute to the humor in the book, mainly done by artists Walter Francis Brown, True W. Williams, Benjamin Henry Day and William Wallace Denslow.

Adaptations of previously published works by James Carter Beard, and Roswell Morse Shurtleff are also added, including, from Edward Whymper's Scrambles amongst the Alps, drawings by James Mahoney.

A few are Mark Twain's own drawings.

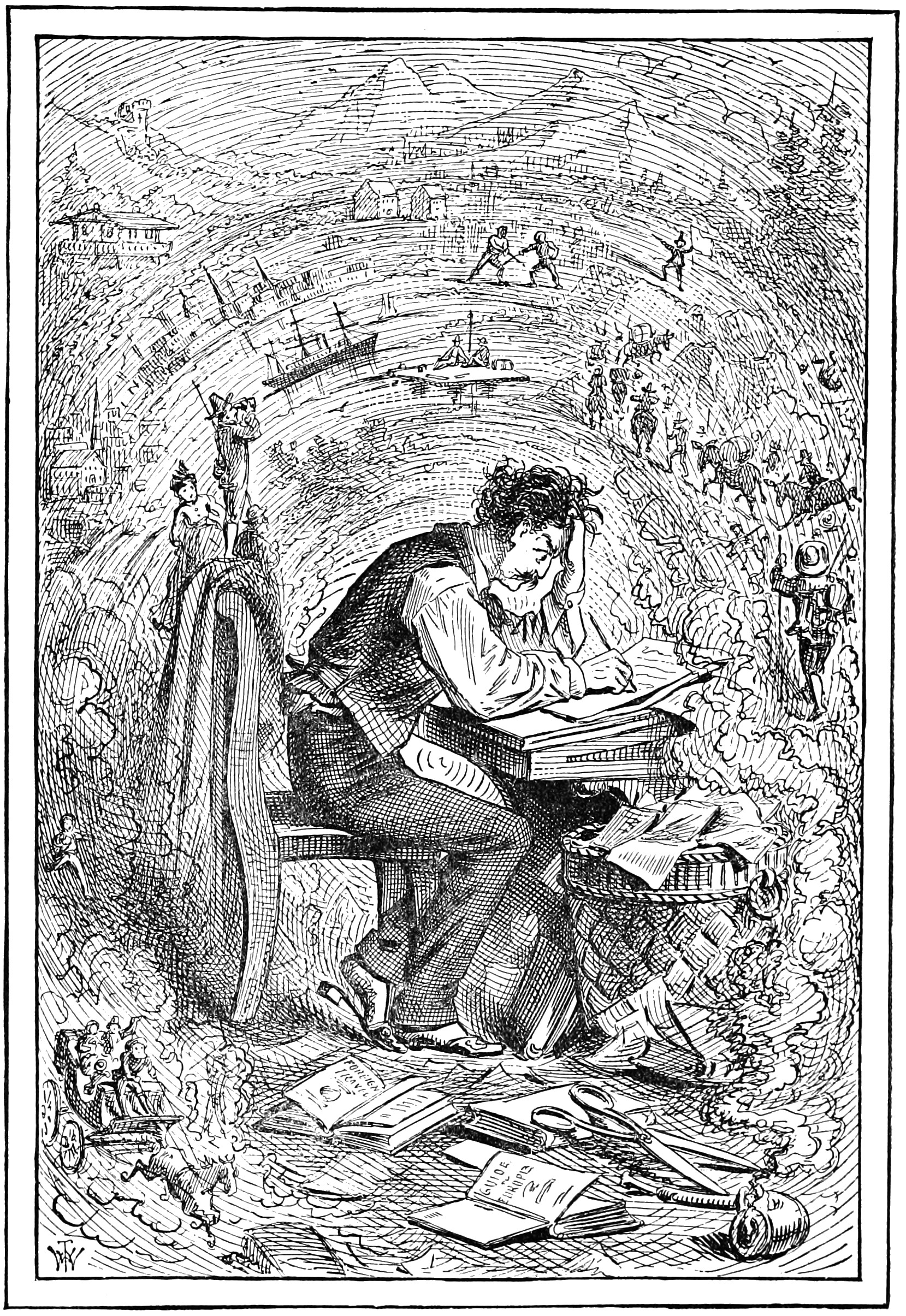
Mark Twain at work by True Williams (The Author's Memories, p. 17)

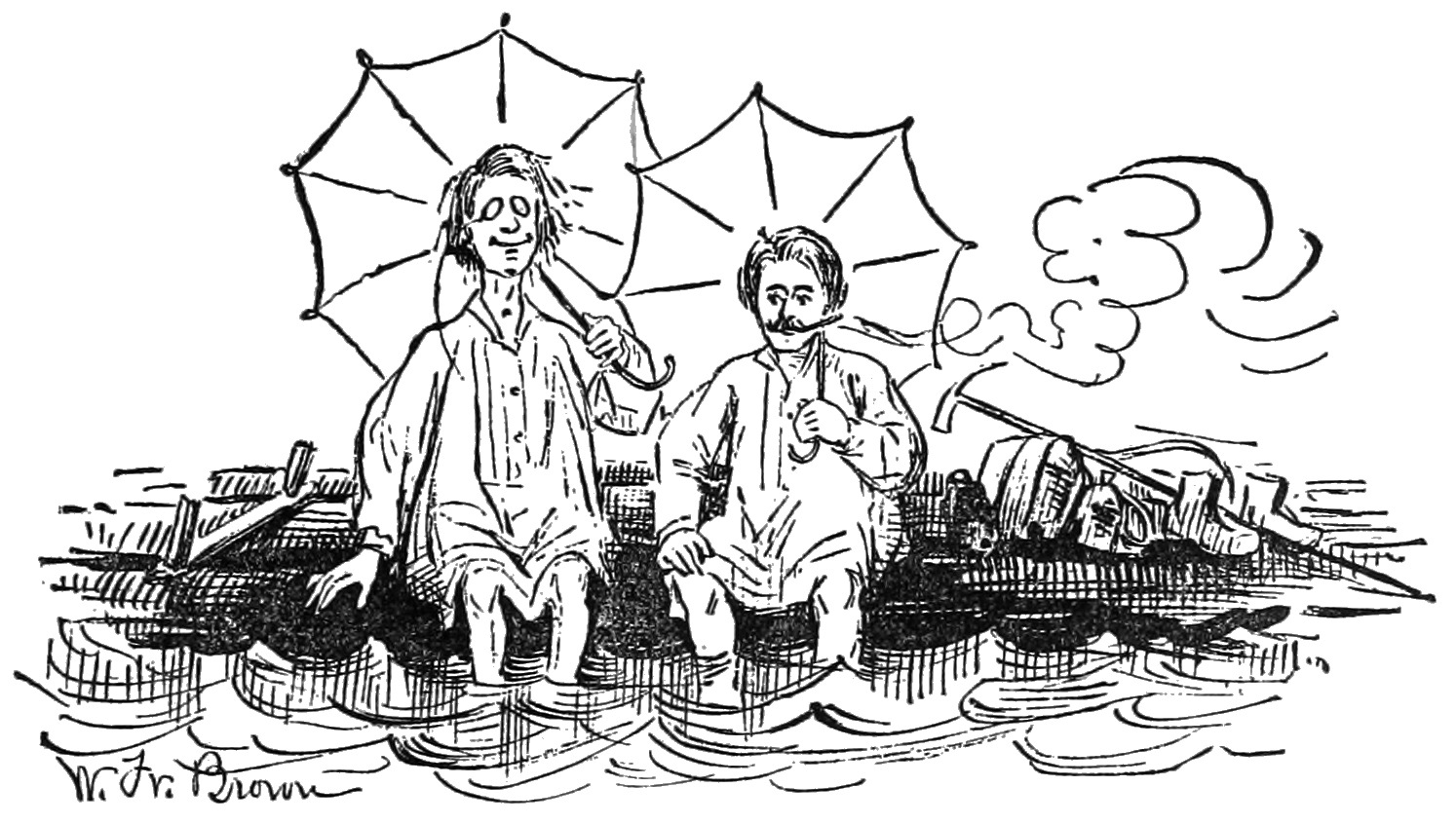
Harris and Twain (?) by Walter Francis Brown (A Deep and Tranquil Ecstacy, p. 129)

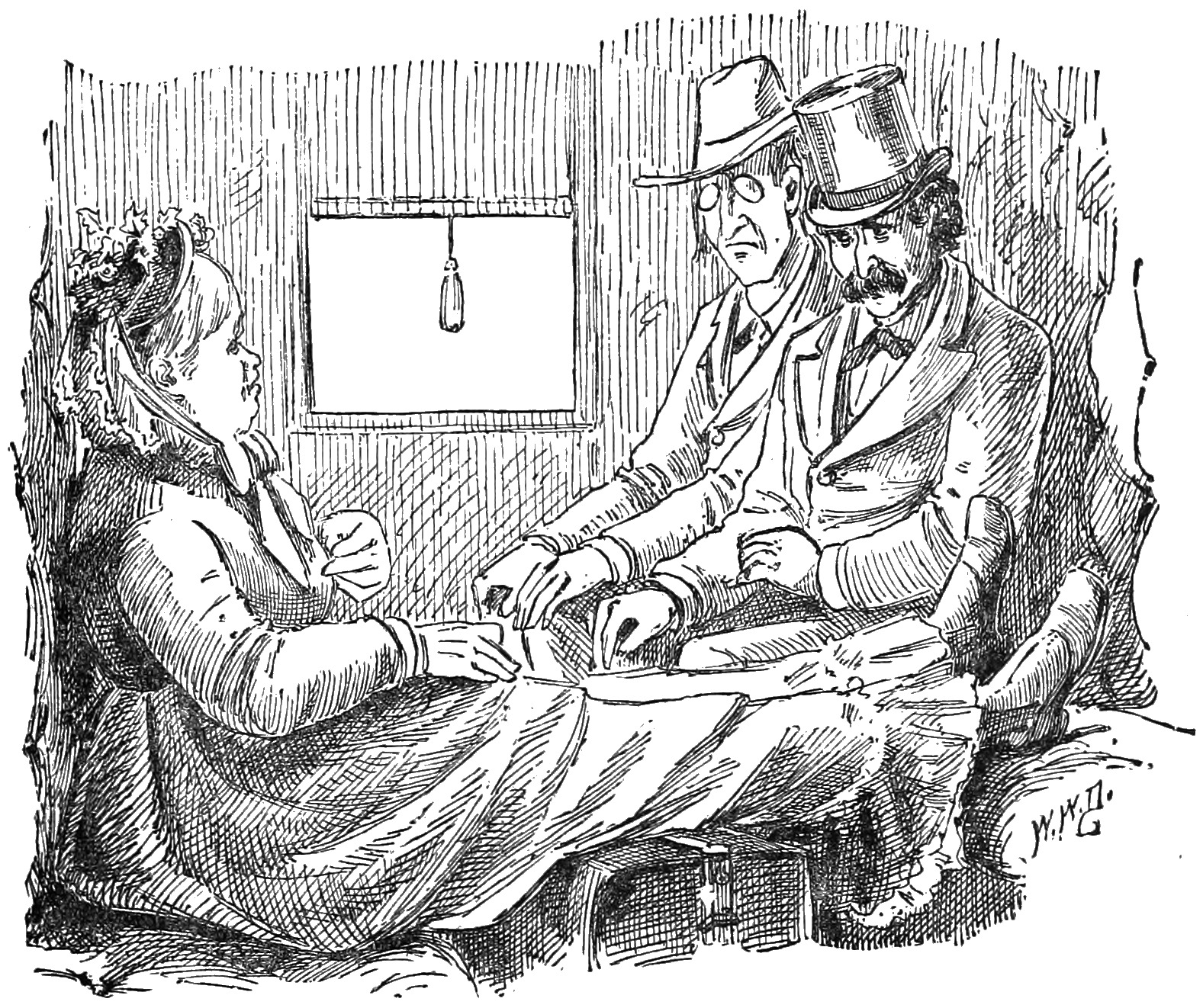
Harris and Twain (?) by William Wallace Denslow (Having Her Full Rights, p. 547)

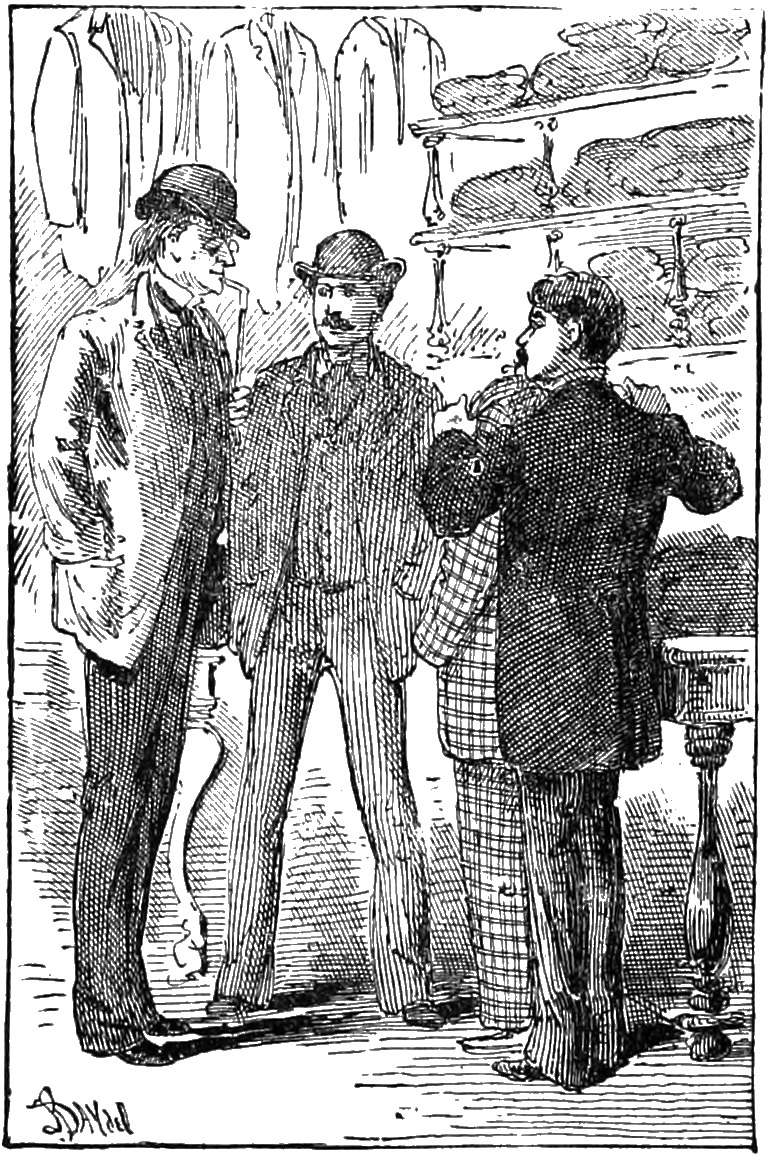
Harris and Twain (?) by Benjamin Henry Day Jr. (Stock in Trade, p. 556)

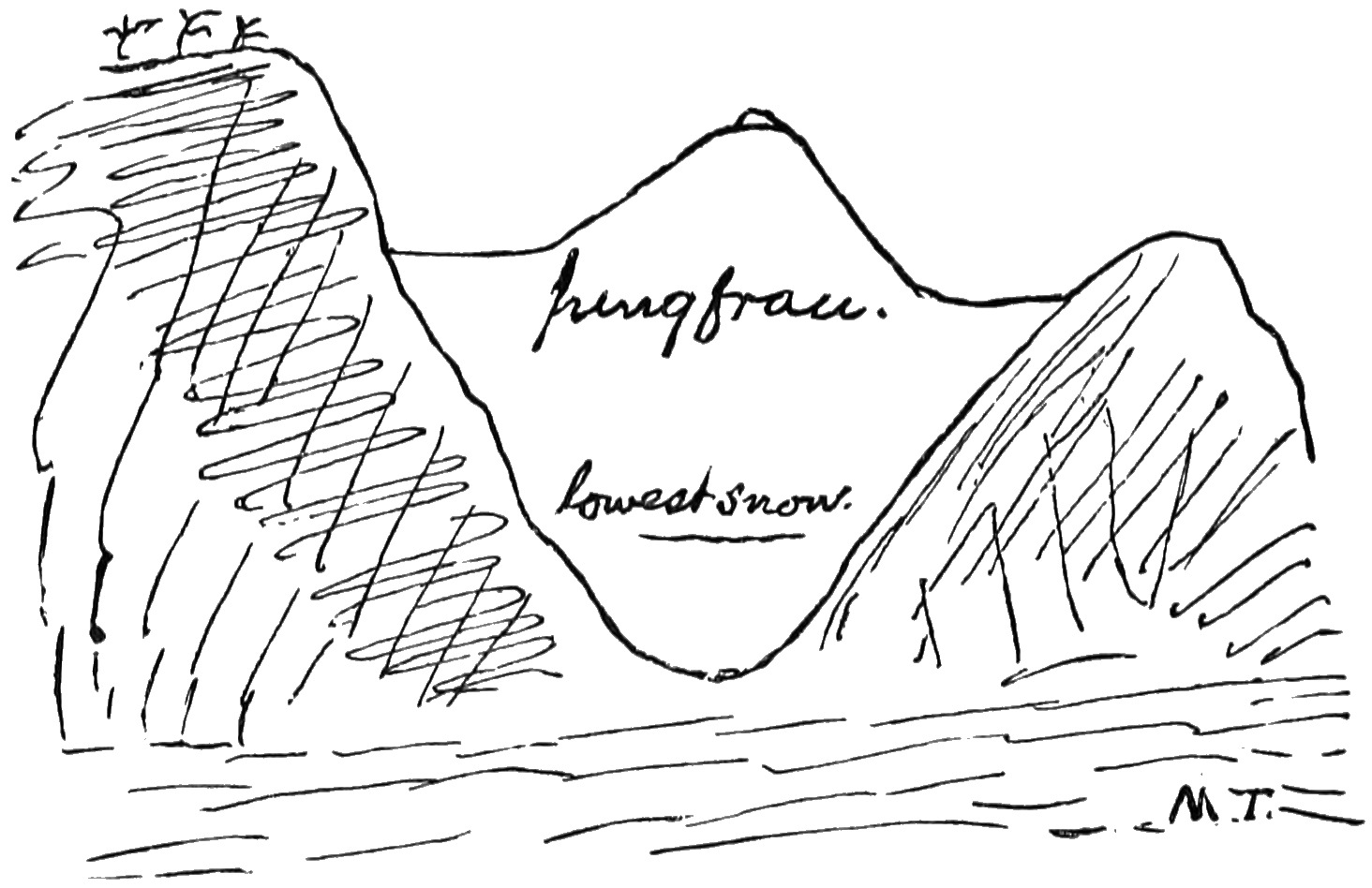
The Jungfrau by M. T. (p. 346)

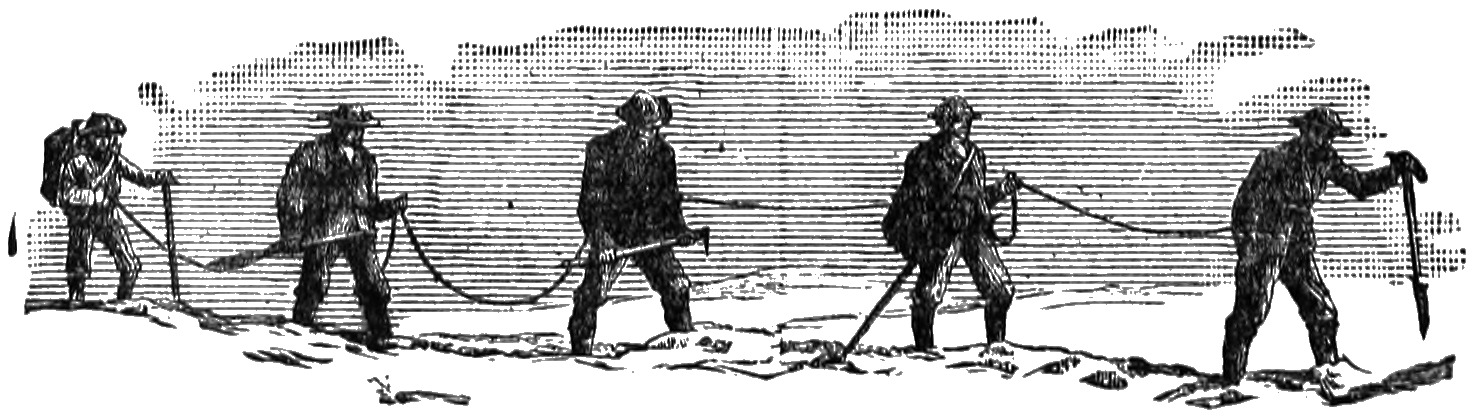
Roped Together, previously published in Scrambles amongst the Alps captioned The Right Way to use a Rope on Glacier with signatures "JM" and "Whymper sc"

== See also ==
- The Awful German Language
