= Clarence Day =

American writer (1874–1935)

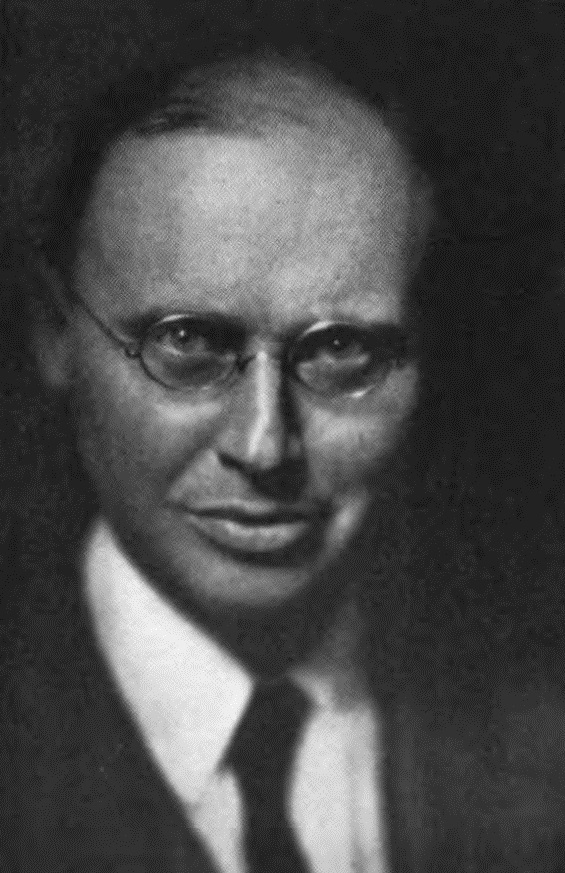
- Born: Clarence Shepard Day Jr. November 18, 1874; New York City, U.S.
- Died: December 28, 1935 (aged 61); New York City, U.S.
- Other name: B.H. Arkwright
- Education: Yale University; St. Paul's School
- Occupations: Author, cartoonist
- Employer: The New Yorker
- Known for: The Story of the Yale University Press (1920); This Simian World (1920); Thoughts Without Words (1928); God and my Father (1932); Scenes from the Mesozoic and Other Drawings (1935); Life with Father (1935); Life with Mother (1937, posthumous); Father and I (1940, posthumous)
- Spouse: Katherine Briggs Dodge (c. 1901–1995)
- Children: Wendy Veevers-Carter
- Parent(s): Clarence Shepard Day Sr (1844–1927); Lavinia (Stockwell) Day (1852–1929)
- Relatives: George Parmly Day (brother), founder of the Yale University Press; Julian Day (brother), stockbroker, soldier Benjamin Henry Day Jr. (uncle); Benjamin Day (grandfather)

Clarence Shepard Day Jr. (November 18, 1874 – December 28, 1935) was an American author and cartoonist, best known for his 1935 work Life with Father.

== Early life and family background ==
Day was born in New York City to Lavinia (née Stockwell) Day and stockbroker Clarence Shepard Day Sr. His father owned a Wall Street brokerage firm and was a banker, a railroad director, and Governor of the New York Stock Exchange.

Clarence Sr.'s firm was established in 1854 and had offices at 21 and 40 Wall Street, next to Federal Hall, and was a member of the Metropolitan Club, Union League Club, American Yacht Club (New York), and New England Society of New York.

His grandfather Benjamin Day and great-uncle Moses Yale Beach were the founders in 1833 of the New York Sun. His uncle Benjamin Henry Day Jr. was the inventor of the Ben Day printing process.

Day attended St. Paul's School and graduated from Yale University in 1896, where he edited the campus humor magazine The Yale Record. He became also a member of the Yale Club of New York.

== Career ==
In 1897, Day joined the New York Stock Exchange, and became a partner in his father's Wall Street brokerage firm. Day enlisted in the U.S. Navy in 1898, but developed crippling arthritis and spent the remainder of his life as a semi-invalid. Upon mustering out of the Navy, he returned to his business career, but his illness forced him to retire in 1903 and seek to improve his health in Arizona and Colorado. He soon returned to New York City, however, and began publishing the Yale Alumni Weekly and contributing essays and drawings to various publications.

Day's most famous work is the autobiographical Life with Father (1935), which detailed humorous episodes in his family's life, centering on his domineering father, during the 1890s in New York City. Scenes from the book, along with its 1932 predecessor God and My Father, and its 1937 sequel Life with Mother, published posthumously, were the basis for the 1939 play by Howard Lindsay and Russel Crouse, which became what is still Broadway's longest-running non-musical hit. In 1947—the year the play ended on Broadway—William Powell and Irene Dunne portrayed Day's parents in the film of the same name, which received Oscar nominations for cinematography, art direction, musical score and best actor (Powell). It also became a popular television sitcom, airing from 1953 to 1955.

Day was a vocal proponent of giving women the right to vote, and contributed satirical cartoons for U.S. suffrage publications in the 1910s. According to James Moske, an archivist with the New York Public Library, who arranged and cataloged the library's Clarence Day Papers, a survey of Day's early short stories and magazine columns reveals "he was fascinated by the changing roles of men and women in American society as Victorian conceptions of marriage, family, and domestic order unraveled in the first decades of the twentieth century."

A long-time contributor to The New Yorker, Day sometimes wrote using the pseudonym B.H. Arkwright. Brendan Gill's memoir Here at The New Yorker reprints a cartoon by Day originally published in that magazine. According to Gill, editor Harold Ross balked at publishing the drawing because it depicted a naked woman with one exposed breast. Day simply removed the nipple—retaining the breast with a broken line in the nipple's place—and Ross published it.

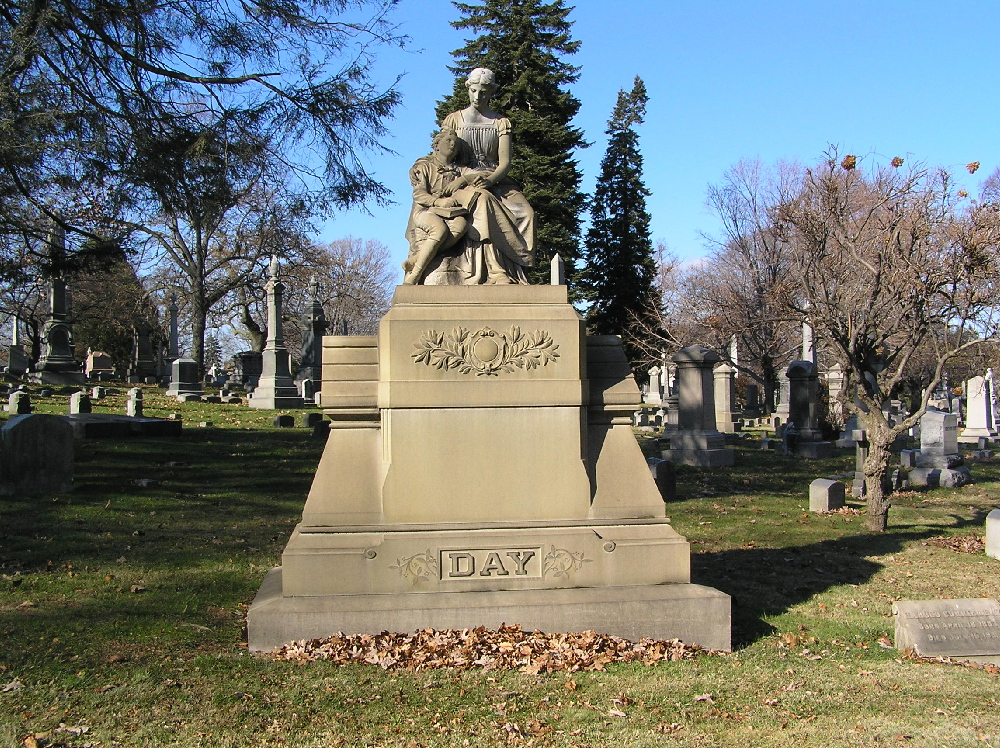
The monument of Clarence Day in Woodlawn Cemetery

Day's "In the Green Mountain Country" recounted the 1933 death and funeral of U.S. president Calvin Coolidge. His essay collection The Crow's Nest received a favorable review in The Nation by the prominent U.S. academician Carl Van Doren; a revised edition with new essays, poems and drawings was published after Day's death under the title After All.

Day achieved lasting fame in literary circles for his comment "The world of books is the most remarkable creation of man. Nothing else that he builds ever lasts. Monuments fall, nations perish, civilizations grow old and die out; and, after an era of darkness, new races build others. But in the world of books are volumes that have seen this happen again and again, and yet live on, still young, still as fresh as the day they were written, still telling men's hearts of the hearts of men centuries dead." The quotation was used in the endpapers for A Soldier's Reader.

The American Library Association honored individuals for outstanding work in encouraging the love of books and reading with the Clarence Day Award from 1959 to 1980. Honorees included Robert B. Downs, Mary Ann O'Brian Malkin, Dee Brown, Frances Clarke Sayers and Granville Hicks.

== Personal life ==
Day's brother George Parmly Day (1876–1959) was the longtime treasurer of Yale University and co-founder, with Clarence, of the Yale University Press. His brother Julian Day (1878–1947) was a stockbroker and soldier who served in the British Army during World War I, serving at Gallipoli and Palestine. He rose to the rank of major in the Imperial Camel Corps, was wounded in battle in 1918 and received the Military Cross and Order of the Nile. He lived in London much of his life.

Day died in New York City of pneumonia shortly after the publication of Life with Father, after it became a best-seller but before its success on Broadway. He was survived by his wife Katherine Briggs Dodge Day and their daughter Wendy.

== Works ==
- The Story of the Yale University Press (1920)
- This Simian World (1920)
- The Crow's Nest (1921)
- Thoughts Without Words (1928)
- God and my Father (1932)
- In the Green Mountain Country (1934)
- Scenes from the Mesozoic and Other Drawings (1935)
- Life with Father (1935)
- After All (1936; posthumous)
- Life with Mother (1937; posthumous)
- The World of Books (1938; posthumous)
- Father and I (1940; posthumous)
- The Noblest Instrument
