= Horatio D. Sheppard =

American journalist

Horatio Davis Sheppard (c. 1809 – February 24, 1879) (sometimes spelled Horatio Shepard) was an American medical doctor who in 1833 founded the first penny press newspaper in the United States, the New York Morning Post.

In 1830, Sheppard was a medical student with no real experience in publishing, but he had witnessed the populace of New York City willing to buy anything that cost a penny. For over a year he approached printing offices to propose that a paper could be successfully sold at a penny price, but had no luck convincing anyone until meeting Francis Story. Story was a foreman at the Spirit of the Times and printer of other items, and wanted to start his own business. He agreed to go in with Sheppard if they also brought on Horace Greeley. Greeley, however, insisted that the paper must be marketed at two cents, not one cent. Sheppard was forced to agree, but that defied the entire scheme of the venture.

With Greeley and Story, the two-cent Morning Post was first issued on January 1, 1833, but it did not prove a success. Its debt was quickly mounting, and they had little capital to speak of. All finally agreed to drop the price to one-cent (for its final two issues, which sold better), but it was too late, and the paper folded the same month. Nevertheless, Sheppard has been credited for the concept of the penny press in America, which proved successful later the same year when Benjamin Day launched The Sun.

After the adventure of the Morning Post ended, Sheppard left the newspaper business and went into medical practice, but he remained friends with Greeley until Greeley's death in 1872.

Sheppard died from pneumonia at St. Luke's Hospital in New York on February 24, 1879.
