= London Plan (disambiguation) =

The London Plan is a document currently written by the Mayor of London.

London Plan may also refer to:

- Greater London Development Plan (published in 1969, approved in 1976), produced by the Greater London Council
- Greater London Plan (1944), developed by Patrick Abercrombie
- County of London Plan (1943), prepared for the London County Council by John Henry Forshaw
- London Plan (newspapers), a largely antiquated system of newspaper distribution in the United States
