= Expressionist Head =

Works by Roy Lichtenstein

- Artist: Roy Lichtenstein
- Year: 1980
- Type: Painted Bronze
- Dimensions: 139.7 cm × 113.7 cm × 45.7 cm (55 in × 44.75 in × 18 in)
- Location: six editions

Expressionist Head by the American pop artist Roy Lichtenstein is the name associated with several 1980s works of art. It is widely associated with a set of six identical sculptures but is also associated with a series of paintings.

== Sculptures ==
In the 1980s and 1990s, Lichtenstein created painted bronze sculptures that were based on his earlier paintings. Expressionist Head was among the earliest of these sculptural adaptations. The sculpture is composed of painted and patinated bronze with painted wooden base.

Expressionist Head reflects rootings of German Expressionist prints because of its "angular anatomies and bold contours", but Lichtenstein swapped out his characteristic Ben-Day dots with hatch marks to in his favored primary colors. Like many Lichtenstein sculptures, this set is essentially two-dimensional rather than volumetric.

Lichtenstein replaced Ben-Day dots with stripes in some of his sketches because it was more efficient. Stripes did not become common in his finished goods until he began working with sculptures. In Expressionist Head, stripes accentuate the sculpture's linear aspects. Like almost all 20 of his sculptures produced up to 1980, this "...began as a line drawing, in elevation; proceeded to full-scale blacktape layout; and then to a magna-painted, handcrafted wooden maquette, which established the mold for the casting...in bronze by lost-wax process."

== Paintings ==
Expressionist Head
- Artist: Roy Lichtenstein
- Year: 1980
- Type: Pop art
- Dimensions: 182 cm × 152 cm (72 in × 60 in)
- Location: various

One element of the painting series (pictured in infobox) was sold at Sotheby's on May 12, 2010 for $4,282,500. In the subsequent months that element of the painting series was exhibited at the Nevada Museum of Art in a four-month single-painting exhibition. There are five different paintings listed on the Lichtenstein Foundation website under the title Expressionist Head. Three are from 1980, while one each is from 1982 and 1984. Another work by the same name had sold at Christie's, New York on November 18, 1997 for $ 300,000 USD.

== Critical commentary ==
The work is presented as feelingless as a statement of the detachment of many current forms of production and reproduction of works of art.

== See also ==
- 1980 in art
