= Newspaper hawker =

Street vendor of newspapers

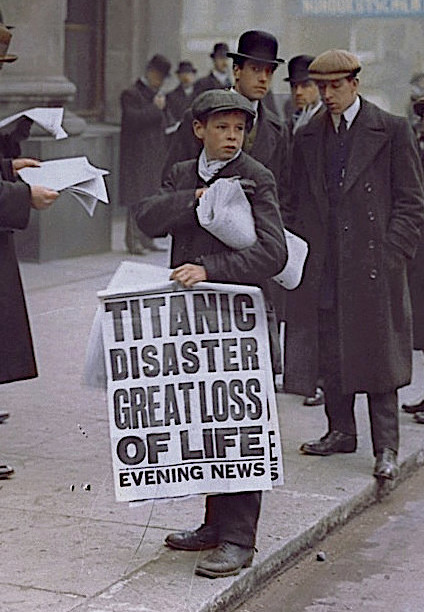
London newsboy Ned Parfett with news of the Titanic disaster, April 16, 1912

A newspaper hawker, newsboy or newsie is a street vendor of newspapers without a fixed newsstand. Related jobs include paperboys, delivering newspapers to subscribers, and news butchers, selling papers on trains. The job was historically done by children, especially in the United States. The profession has faced significant decline worldwide in modern times owing to the advent of online news.

In the United States they became an iconic image of youthful entrepreneurship. Famous Americans that had worked as newsboys included Bruce Barton, Ralph Bunche, Joe DiMaggio, Thomas Edison, Dwight Eisenhower, Sam Rayburn, Walter Reuther, David Sarnoff, Cardinal Spellman, Harry Truman and Mark Twain.

== United States ==
Benjamin Franklin is sometimes called the "first American newsboy", as he helped deliver his brother's New England Courant in 1721. But the real beginning of the trade of newsboy comes in 1833, when the New York Sun started hiring vendors in New York City. At the time, newspapers were generally either picked up at the newspaper's office, sent by mail, or delivered by printers' apprentices or other employees. The Sun, by contrast, was not sold in stores or by subscription. Its publisher, Benjamin Day, recruited unemployed people using help-wanted notices to vend his newspaper. Instead of the adults he expected, his ad drew children: the first was the 10-year-old Irish immigrant Bernard Flaherty, who turned out to be a talented hawker—later a stage comedian—who would cry out the day's most sensational headlines: "Double Distilled Villainy"; "Cursed Effects of Drunkenness!"; "Awful Occurrence!"; "Infamous Affair!". These newsboys could either hawk to passersby on the street or establish subscription routes; many did both.

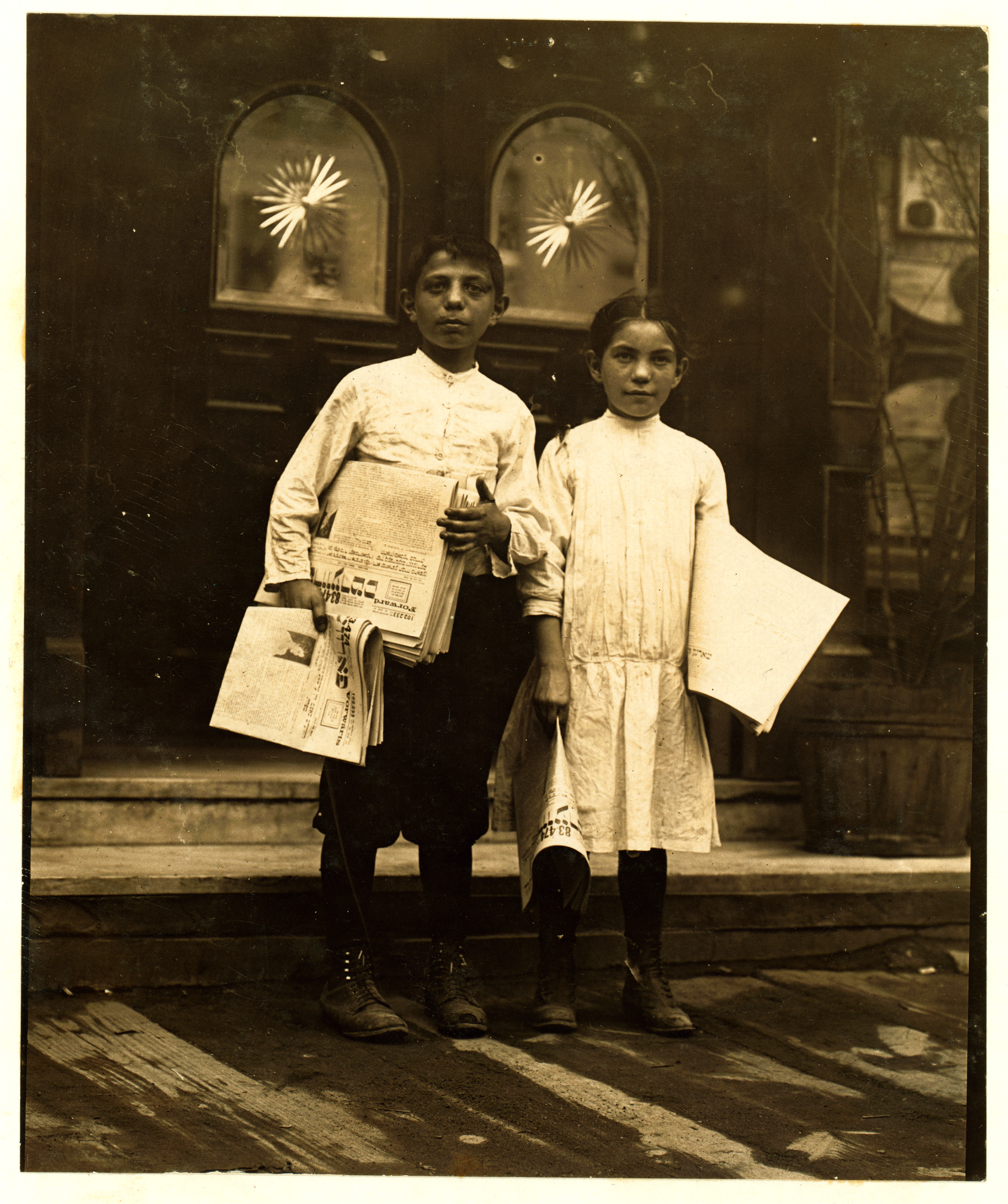
A newsgirl and boy selling papers outside saloon entrances in New York, 1910; girls were very rare.

Newsboys were not employees of the newspapers but rather purchased the papers from wholesalers in packets of 100 and peddled them as independent agents. Unsold papers could not be returned. The newsboys typically earned around 30 cents a day (equivalent to $12 in 2025) and often worked until late at night. Cries of "Extra, extra!" were often heard into the morning hours as newsboys attempted to hawk every last paper.

American photographer Lewis Hine crusaded against child labor in the United States in the early 20th century by taking photographs that exposed frightful conditions, especially in factories and coal mines. He photographed youths who worked in the streets as well, but his photographs of them did not depict another appalling form of dangerous child labor or immigrant poverty, for they were not employees. The symbolic newsboy, influenced by Hine's photography, became an iconic image in discourses about childhood, ambition and independence.

=== Great Depression ===
Newsboy selling The Chicago Defender, April 1941, by Jack Delano

In the 1930s, newsboys delivered papers to houses by bicycle or wagon. Newspapers lost circulation and advertising as the economy declined, and needed to boost revenues and cut expenses. Starting in 1930, the International Circulation Managers' Association launched a national operation to show local newspaper managers how to boost home newspaper readership. They designed a prepackaged curriculum in door-to-door subscription marketing that taught newsboys new skills in scheduling time, handling money, keeping accounts, and—especially—presenting a winning salesman persona. This movement created the middle-class newspaper boy and permanently altered the relationship between teenage years and entrepreneurial enterprise. The teenage boys were still independent contractors rather than employees, but the circulation manager designed the routes and taught the boys how to collect and account for the subscription money.

=== Critics and reformers ===
Newsboys were often seen as victims of poverty and delinquents in the making. In 1875 a popular writer found them a nuisance:

There are 10,000 children living on the streets of New York....The newsboys constitute an important division of this army of homeless children. You see them everywhere.... They rend the air and deafen you with their shrill cries. They surround you on the sidewalk and almost force you to buy their papers. They are ragged and dirty. Some have no coats, no shoes, and no hat.

In St. Louis, Missouri, in the first half of the 20th century, reformers saw the newsboys as potential victims of the dangers and temptations of the urban environment. A 1903 law created the state's first juvenile courts with the ability to hear criminal cases involving minors. In Cincinnati in 1919, charity workers found that a tenth of the teenage boys were news hawkers, and they earned only 20 cents a day (equivalent to $4 in 2025). They were twice as likely to be delinquents, they gambled a great deal amongst themselves, and were often attacked by thugs from other newspapers. The recommendation was to replace newsboys under the age of 16 with crippled war veterans.

=== News butcher ===
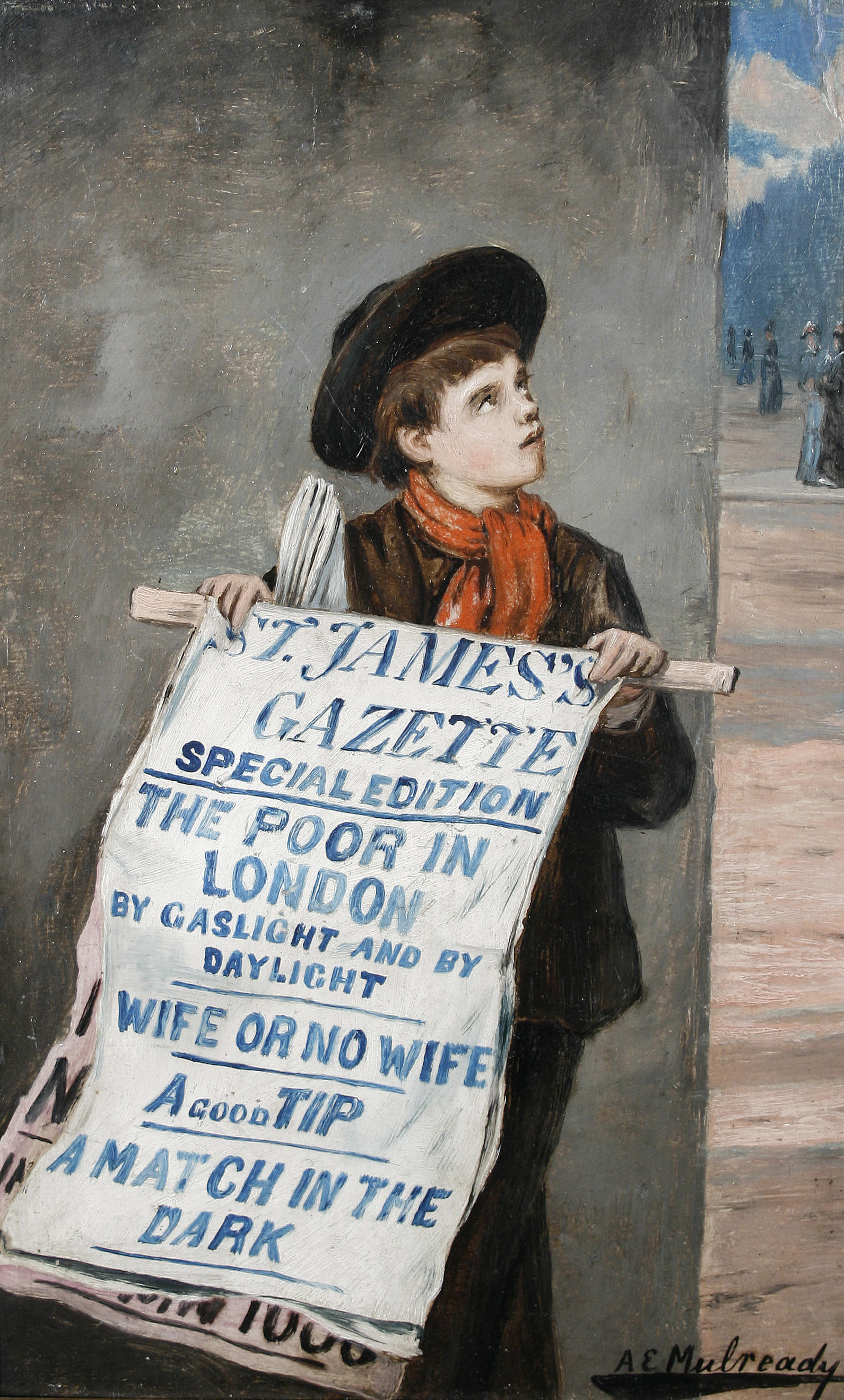
The paintings of London artist Augustus Edwin Mulready (1844–1904) told his audience that when they see a newsboy hawking papers they should see him as a symptom of poverty and urban malaise.

"News butchers" worked on passenger railroads selling newspapers, candy, and cigars to the passengers. Thomas Edison was a news butcher in his youth, but he lost that job after he set the baggage car on fire due to white phosphorus igniting in a chemistry set he had onboard. Walt Disney worked as a news butcher on the Missouri Pacific Railway as a teenager, and his memories of that experience influenced his design of the Disneyland Railroad.

== Ireland ==
Stephanie Rains examines the newsboy as a characteristic presence on Irish streets in the early twentieth century and also necessary last link in the chain of media production and distribution. Publishers depended on boys as young as eleven years old to sell papers, especially in downtown areas. Newsboys were very visible and audible figures on Irish city streets and were themselves the subject of frequent newspaper stories which typically represented them as exemplars of the urban working classes for middle-class readers.

== Labor actions and strikes ==
Newsboys struck for better pay and working conditions multiple times: 1884, 1886, 1887, 1889, and in May 1898. In the newsboys' strike of July 1899, many New York newsboys refused to deliver major newspapers, and asked the public to boycott them. The press run of Joseph Pulitzer's World fell by nearly two-thirds. After a hectic two-week strike, the papers capitulated: while they did not lower their prices, they agreed to buy back all unsold papers, and the union disbanded.

The New York newsboys' strike of 1899 inspired later strikes, including the Newsboys Strike of 1914 in Butte, Montana, and a 1920s strike in Louisville, Kentucky. Chicago newsboys faced an uphill battle to gain better incomes, particularly during the 1912 media strike. Attempts to unionize were sporadic and undercut by intimidation and sometimes violent counter-responses by the publishers.

According to Jon Bekken:

Documented newsboy strikes took place in Boston (1901, 1908); Chicago (1912); Cleveland (1934); Des Moines (1922); Detroit (1877); Kansas City, Kansas (1947); Lexington, Kentucky (1899); Minneapolis (1918); Mobile (1942); New York City (1886, 1890, 1893, 1898, 1899, 1908, 1918, 1922, 1941, 1948); Oakland (1928); Portland, Oregon (1914); St. Louis (1945); San Jose, California (2000); and Seattle (1917).

During 1933 to 1935, the New Deal agency, the National Recovery Administration (NRA), promulgated a newspaper industry code that restricted juvenile employment in order to help unemployed adults. The restrictions expired when the Supreme Court in 1935 struck down the NRA as unconstitutional.

== Modern times ==
In Wales, it was announced in July 2011 that Media Wales, publisher of the Western Mail and South Wales Echo, would no longer employ newspaper vendors in Cardiff city center. A spokesman said distribution of the newspaper by the vendors cost more than the newspaper received in return. In 2025, a French newspaper hawker named Ali Akbar was awarded the Ordre national du Mérite for his contributions to French society. He is the last newspaper hawker in France, and, according to the BBC, possibly the last newspaper hawker in all of Europe. According to Akbar, the advent of online news has resulted in a significant decline in sales.

== See also ==
- Newsboys' strike of 1899 in New York City
- Newsboy cap, a kind of hat worn by newsboys
- Newsboy Legion, a comic-book kid gang
