= True Williams =

American illustrator (1839–1897)

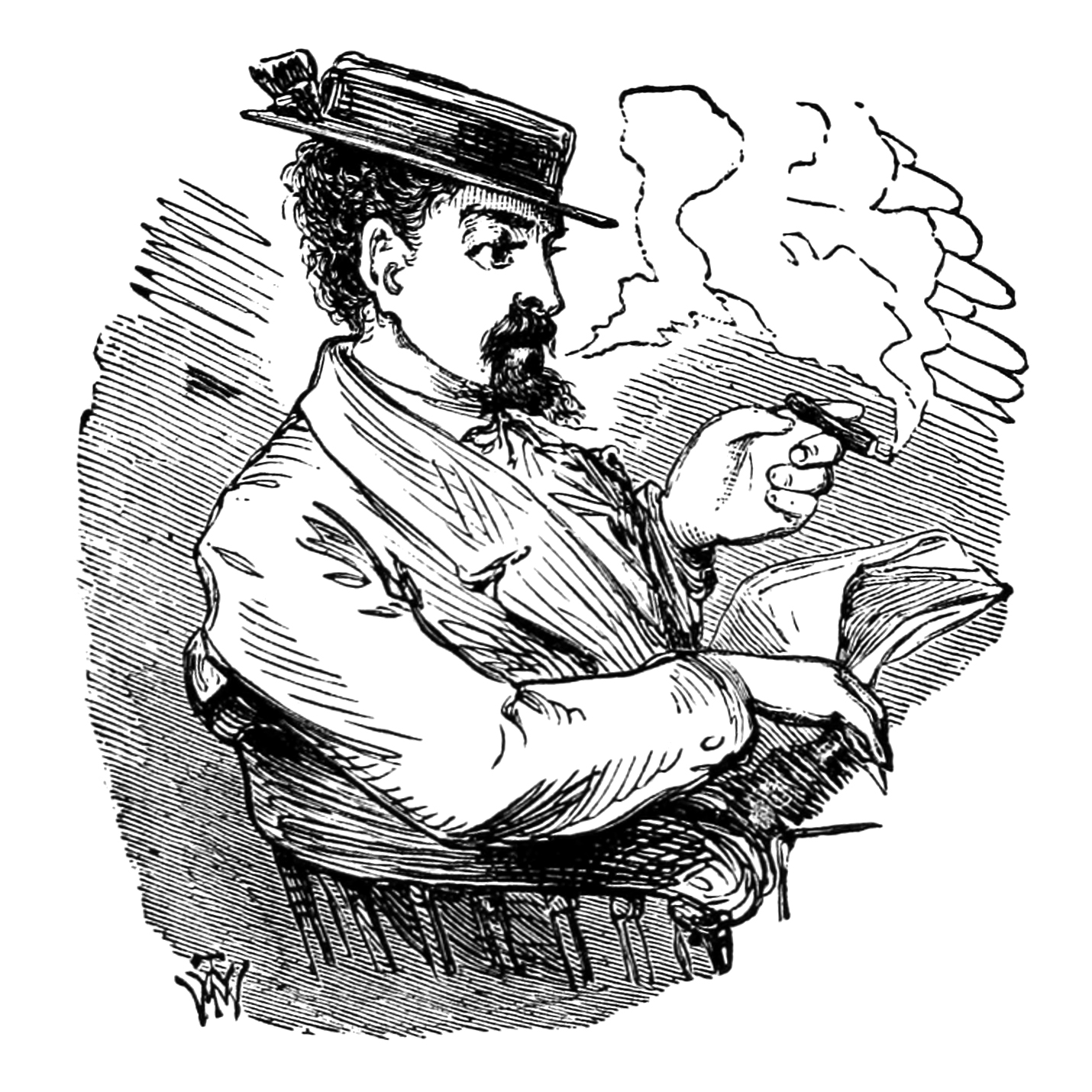
- Born: Truman W. Williams; March 22, 1839; Allegany County, New York
- Died: November 23, 1897 (aged 58); Chicago
- Known for: Illustration
- Notable work: The Adventures of Tom Sawyer (1869)

Truman W. "True" Williams (March 22, 1839 – November 23, 1897) was an American artist known as the most prolific illustrator to Mark Twain's books and novels. He illustrated the first edition of The Adventures of Tom Sawyer (1876) and was thus the first to visually portray such characters as Tom Sawyer and Huckleberry Finn. He was also sole illustrator of Twain's Sketches, New and Old and primary illustrator of Roughing It and The Innocents Abroad. Working with a number of publishers he also illustrated works by writers Bill Nye, George W. Peck, Joaquin Miller, and others. He was also a notorious drunk, which slowed his work and made him unreliable.

== Early life and career ==
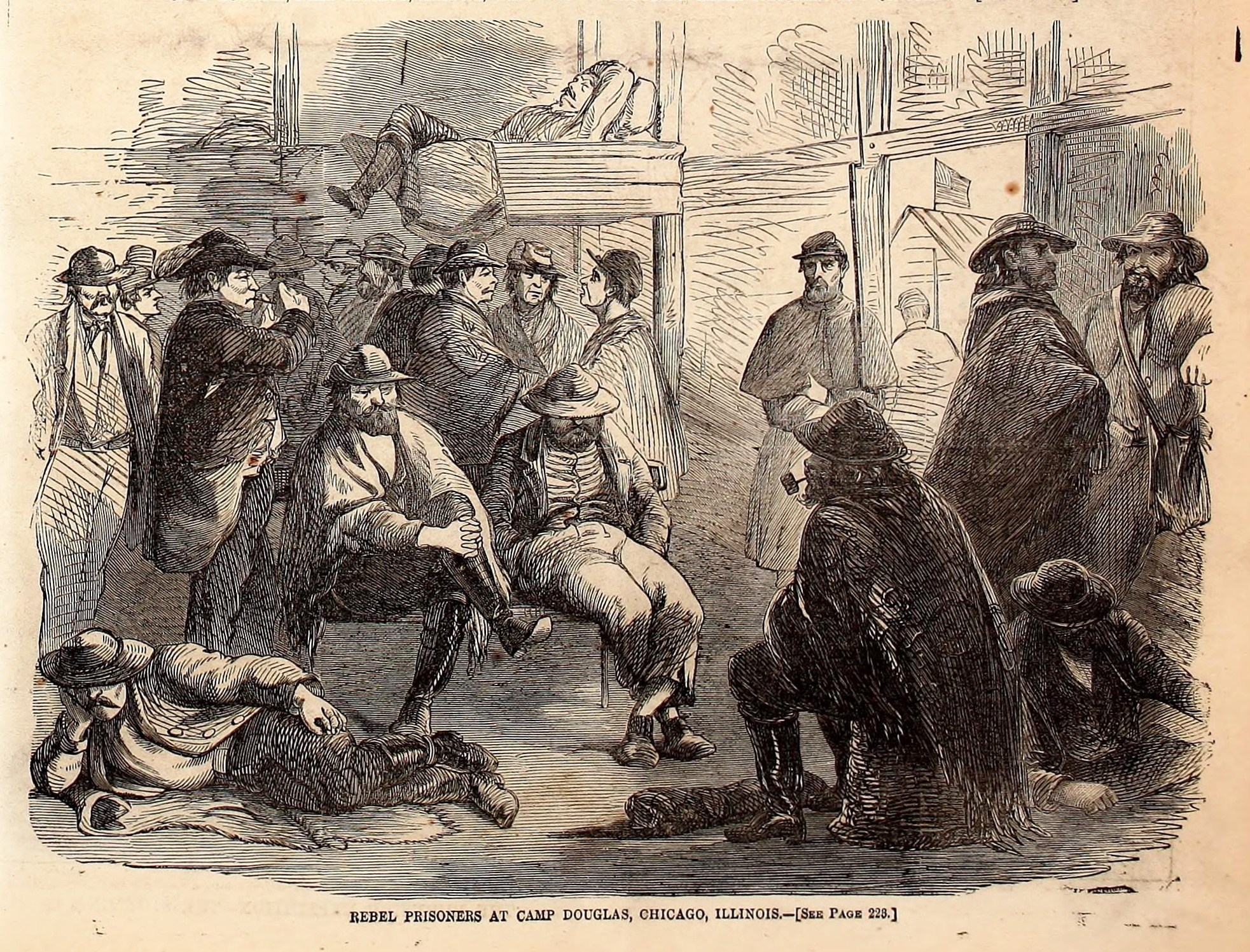
One of Williams' earliest published works: rebel prisoners at Camp Douglas (April 5, 1862)

Truman W. Williams (his full middle name is unknown) was born on March 22, 1839, in Allegany County, New York, to parents Asa and Louisa Keelar Williams. Williams grew up in Watertown. Williams was a self-taught illustrator, and his talent appeared at a young age. One of his earliest published works appeared in Harper's Weekly in April 1862, illustrating Confederate prisoners of the Civil War. Williams later enlisted in a volunteer infantry unit in Illinois, serving from December 21, 1863, to October 9, 1865, during which he worked under General William T. Sherman as a topographical engineer. Williams was uninjured in service but later claimed a lifelong battle with painful varicose veins in his legs from "severe marching and hard service."

He began illustrating professionally in the 1860s: two of his illustrations appeared in an 1869 edition of Albert Deane Richardson's book Beyond the Mississippi, published by the American Publishing Company of Hartford, Connecticut. By 1870 was back in New York, when his work began appearing in the magazine Harper's Bazar and other New York publishers.

== Illustrating Twain ==
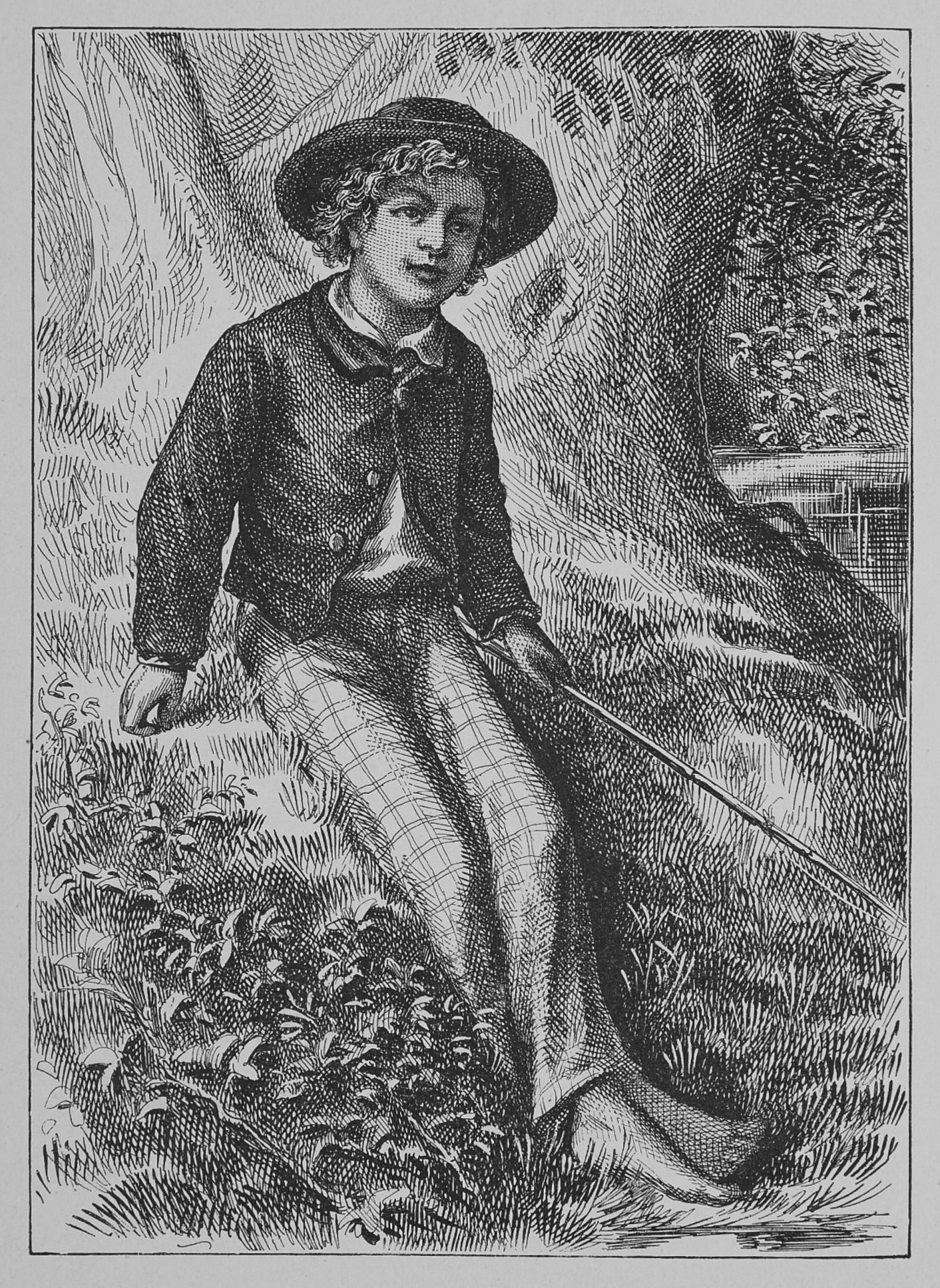
Williams' iconic image of Tom Sawyer

"Williams was a man of great talent—of fine imagination and sweetness of spirit—but it was necessary to lock him in a room when industry was required, with nothing more exciting than cold water as a beverage." - Albert Bigelow Paine

Williams' first work for Twain was The Innocents Abroad, of which he contributed the majority of illustrations. Biographer Albert Bigelow Paine calls Innocents "Twain's greatest book of travel", and writes: "we may believe that Williams was not a great draftsman, but no artist ever caught more perfectly the light and spirit of the author's text."

Literary critic Michael Patrick Hearn describes Williams as "an indifferent draftsman, his pictures varying from coarse to the highly sentimental". Regarding his work in Tom Sawyer, Warren Chappell writes "it is evident that Williams did not always take care in reading the text. As the first man to do the whitewashing scene, he carelessly used a rail fence instead of the board fence which is described." Williams was also known to incorporate subtle humor into his illustrations for Tom Sawyer: he placed his own name on a gravestone in one scene, and in another it has been suggested he deliberately altered the lettering on a sign reading "The pen is mightier than the sword" to appear "the penis mightier than the sword", a pun which Twain himself used many years later.

William's style in Tom Sawyer influenced E. W. Kemble's work in his illustrations to Adventures of Huckleberry Finn (1884).

== Other work ==
In addition to his work with Twain, he illustrated an autobiography of P. T. Barnum and works by the likes of humorists George Wilbur Peck and Bill Nye, and his work appeared in Harper's Weekly and Harper's Bazaar. He wrote one book of his own, an adventure novel called Frank Fairweather's Fortunes, and edited a book of poems called Under the Open Sky. Both were released in 1890, and illustrated exclusively by Williams.

== Personal life and death ==
Williams married Carrie M. Heath April 19, 1884. She died on July 25, 1885, from tuberculosis and premature childbirth, and their premature son died shortly after. On July 27, 1886 Williams married Rose Heath, the younger sister of Carrie. They divorced in 1892 due to True's alcoholism, which included being drunk for a week or more. He died in Chicago, Illinois, from internal bleeding due to an aortic aneurysm on November 23, 1897, at the age of 58.

== Works ==
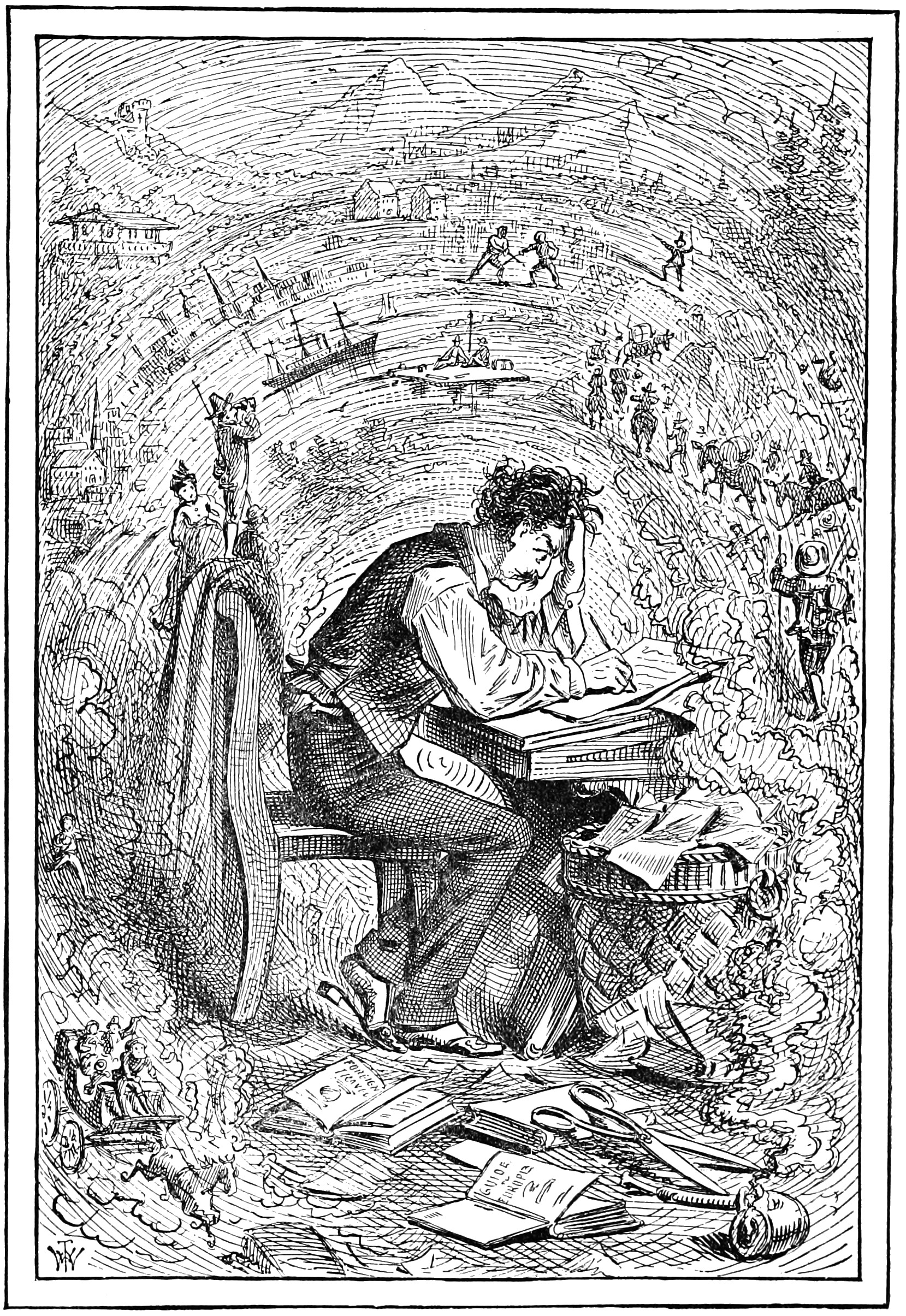
Mark Twain at work, from A Tramp Abroad (1880).

Williams' work appears in six works by Mark Twain:

- The Innocents Abroad (1869)
- Roughing It (1872)
- The Gilded Age (1873)
- Sketches New and Old (1875)
- The Adventures of Tom Sawyer (1876)
- A Tramp Abroad (1880)

Own works:

- Frank Fairweather's Fortunes (1890)

Works by other authors in which Williams was sole or contributing artist include:

- Struggles and Triumphs (1869) by P. T. Barnum
- Unwritten History: Life Amongst the Modocs (1874) by Joaquin Miller
- Bill Nye's Chestnuts Old & New (1888) by Bill Nye
- Peck's Bad Boy and His Pa (1890), by George W. Peck

== Sources ==
- Chappell, Warren (2004). "Tom Sawyer and the Illustrators". Mark Twain Journal. 42 (2): 19–25. JSTOR 41641546.
- Ensor, Allison R. (1989). "'Mightier than the Sword': An Undetected Obscenity in the First Edition of Tom Sawyer". Mark Twain Journal. 27 (1): 25–26. JSTOR 41641329.
- Hearn, Michael Patrick (2001). "Introduction". In Twain, Mark; Hearn, Michael Patrick (eds.). The Annotated Huckleberry Finn: Adventures of Huckleberry Finn (Tom Sawyer's Comrade). W. W. Norton & Co. ISBN 978-0-393-02039-7.
- Paine, Albert Bigelow (1912). Mark Twain, a Biography: The Personal and Literary Life of Samuel Langhorne Clemens. Harper & Brothers.
- Powers, Ron (2005). Mark Twain: A Life. Free Press. ISBN 978-0-7432-7475-3.
- Rasmussen, R. Kent (2014). Critical Companion to Mark Twain: A Literary Reference to His Life and Work. Infobase Publishing. pp. 943–944. ISBN 978-1-4381-0852-0.
- Schmidt, Barbara (2001). "The Life and Art of True W. Williams". Mark Twain Journal. 39 (2): 1–60. JSTOR 41641516.
- Schmidt, Barbara (August 18, 2001). "A Closer Look at the Lives of True Williams and Alexander Belford". twainquotes.com.
