= Ali Akbar (newspaper hawker) =

Pakistani newspaper hawker (born 1950s)

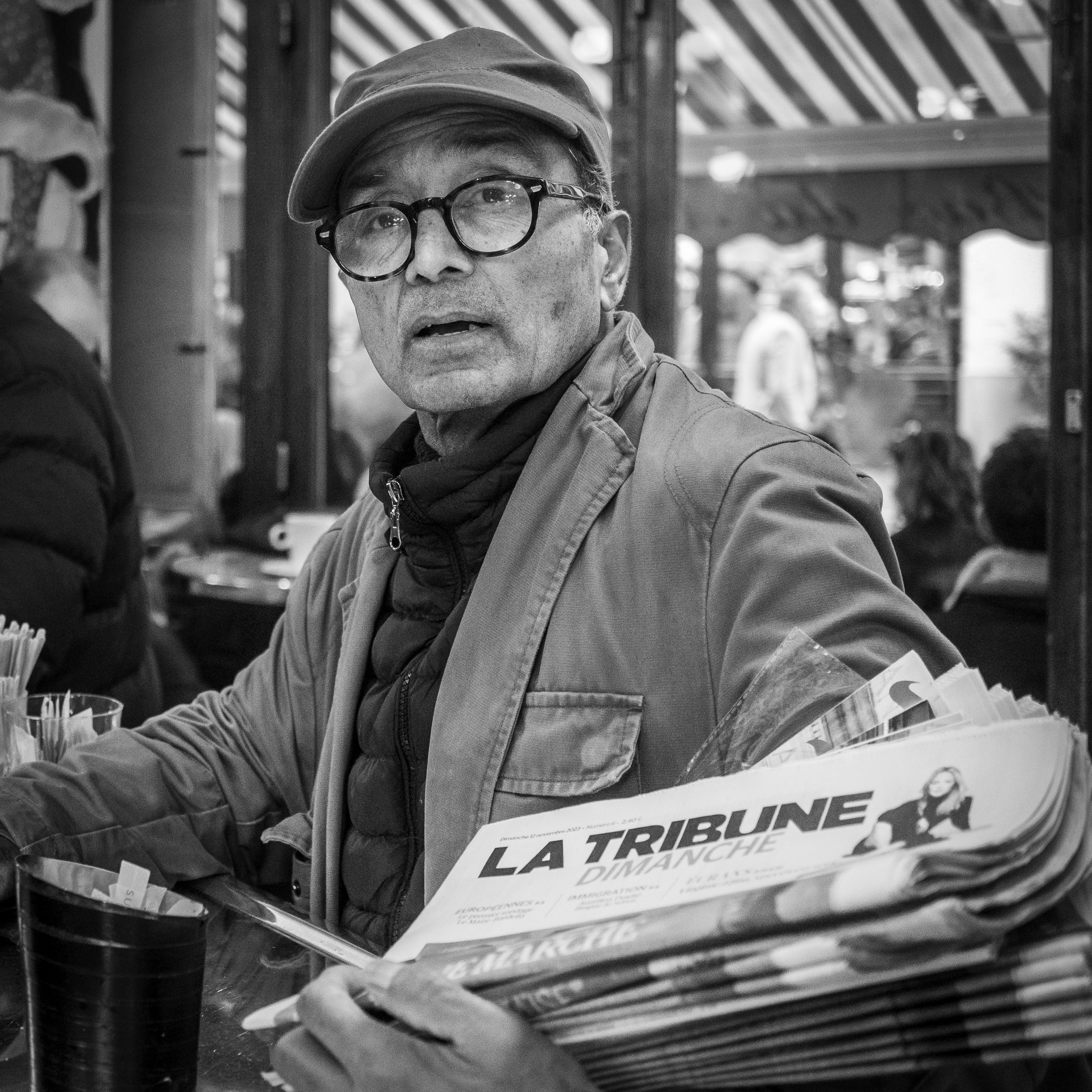
- Ali Akbar in 2023
- Born: 1952 or 1953 (age 72–73); Rawalpindi, Pakistan
- Occupation: Newspaper hawker
- Years active: 1973–present

Ali Akbar (Urdu: علی اکبر; born 1952 or 1953) is a Pakistani newspaper hawker based in Paris. He began selling newspapers in Saint-Germain-des-Prés in 1973, and is now the last newspaper hawker in France. In 2025, Akbar was appointed a knight of the Ordre national du Mérite for his contributions to French culture by President Emmanuel Macron, a former customer.

== Early life ==
Ali Akbar was born into poverty in Rawalpindi, Pakistan, in 1952 or 1953. After dropping out of school when he was 12 years old, he worked odd jobs and taught himself how to read. At 18, he travelled to Kabul, Afghanistan, on his way to Europe, where he was offered hashish by some hippies but declined, telling them he had "a mission in life". He eventually reached Athens and worked on a ship before disembarking at Shanghai and returning to Rawalpindi. He travelled to Greece again and returned to Pakistan when his visa expired. In the 1960s, Akbar moved to Amsterdam where he began working on a cruise liner. The ship docked in Rouen in 1972, and Akbar moved to Paris the next year. He received his French residency papers in the 1980s.

== Career ==
Akbar began selling newspapers when he moved to Paris in 1973, starting by selling the satirical Charlie Hebdo paper to students at Sorbonne University and other nearby institutions. Newspaper sales were already declining in the 1970s due to the growing popularity of news television, and the advent of online news caused further declines in sales. When Akbar began hawking, there were about 40 hawkers in Paris, but he is now the last hawker in France, and, according to BBC, possibly the last in Europe. He is known for his catchphrase, "Ça y est!" (transl. "That's it!"), which he shouts while selling papers. He also sometimes humorously yells about made-up headlines to attract attention. When he began hawking, he sold about 300 papers every day, but as of 2025 sells about 40. He also makes money from a small pension, and he runs a food truck near the Jardin du Luxembourg.

Akbar is considered by locals to be an important part of the community and a staple of Parisian culture. A book about his life was published in 2009. In 2025, French president Emmanuel Macron, a former customer of Akbar's, appointed him a Chevalier (knight) of the Ordre national du Mérite. Although Akbar is a French resident, he has not received citizenship yet, and he stated that he hopes the award will help him finally become a citizen.
