= Roswell Morse Shurtleff =

American painter

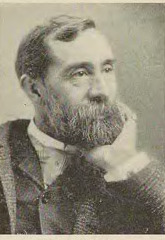
- from Essays on American Art and Artists (1896)
- Born: June 14 1838; Rindge, New Hampshire, U.S.
- Died: 1915; New York City, U.S.
- Education: Dartmouth College
- Occupations: Painter, illustrator

Roswell Morse Shurtleff (June 14, 1838 –1915) was an American painter and illustrator. Born in Rindge, New Hampshire, he graduated from Dartmouth College and was imprisoned by the Confederate States Army for eight months during the American Civil War of 1861–1865. In the postbellum years, he was an illustrator for magazines and newspapers, and an animalier and landscape painter. His work is in the collections of the Harvard Art Museums, the National Gallery of Art, and the Smithsonian American Art Museum.

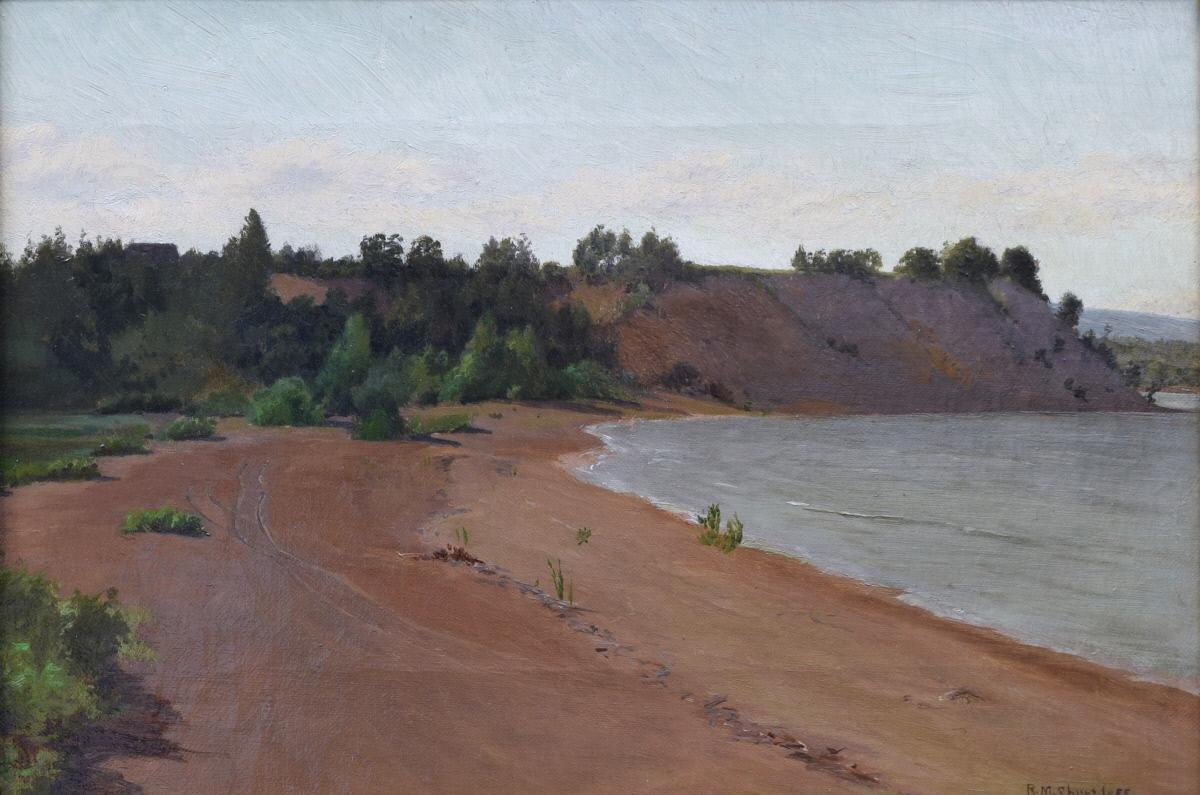
Scene on the Upper Hudson
