= The Innocents Abroad =

1869 travel book by Mark Twain

The Innocents Abroad, or, The New Pilgrim's Progress
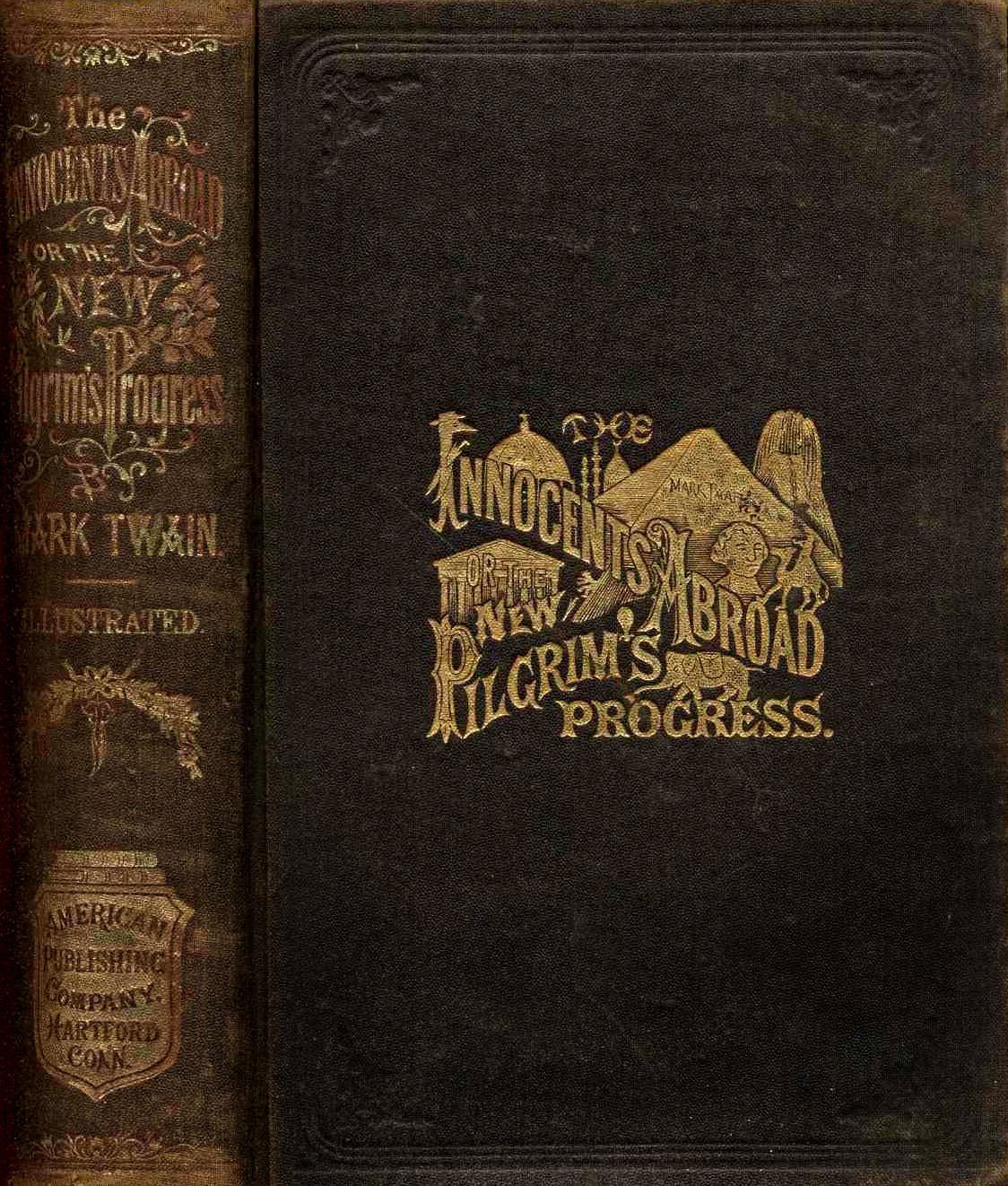
- Innocents Abroad cover
- Author: Mark Twain
- Language: English
- Genre: Travel literature
- Publisher: American Publishing Company
- Publication date: 1869
- Publication place: United States
- Media type: Print
- Pages: 685
- Dewey Decimal: 818.403
- LC Class: PS1312.A1
- Preceded by: The Celebrated Jumping Frog of Calaveras County
- Followed by: Roughing It
- Text: The Innocents Abroad, or, The New Pilgrim's Progress at Wikisource

The Innocents Abroad, or The New Pilgrim's Progress is a travel book by American author Mark Twain. Published in 1869, it humorously chronicles what Twain called his "Great Pleasure Excursion" on board the chartered steamship Quaker City (formerly USS Quaker City) through Europe and the Holy Land with a group of American travelers in 1867. The five-month voyage included numerous side trips on land.

The book, which sometimes appears with the subtitle "The New Pilgrim's Progress", became the best-selling of Twain's works during his lifetime, as well as one of the best-selling travel books of all time.

== Publication history ==
Mark Twain's journey aboard the Quaker City was funded by the Alta California newspaper in exchange for fifty articles documenting his trip. Twain later secured a contract with the American Publishing Company to produce a subscription-based book based on the same journey. The publication by subscription book would become The Innocents Abroad. Twain restructured and expanded upon the letters he had originally written for the Alta California to write The Innocents Abroad, adjusting his style by minimizing slang and vulgar language to cater to a broader, national readership. He also rewrote some of the characters and stories. The Innocents Abroad was Mark Twain's first successful publication for a national audience.

== Analysis ==
The Innocents Abroad presents itself as an ordinary travel book based on an actual voyage in a retired Civil War ship, the USS Quaker City. The excursion was billed as a voyage to the Holy Land, with numerous stops and side trips along the coast of the Mediterranean Sea, notably:

- train excursion from Marseille to Paris for the 1867 Paris Exhibition during the reign of Napoleon III and the Second French Empire
- journey through the Papal States to Rome
- side trip through the Black Sea to Odessa, Sebastopol and Yalta
- culminating excursion through the Holy Land

Twain reports the voyage covered over 20,000 miles of land and sea.

Twain recorded his observations and critiques of the various aspects of culture and society which he encountered on the journey, some more serious than others. Many of his observations draw a contrast between his own experiences and the often grandiose accounts in contemporary travelogues, which were regarded in their own time as indispensable aids for traveling in the region. In particular, he lampooned William Cowper Prime's Tent Life in the Holy Land for its overly sentimental prose and its often violent encounters with native inhabitants. Twain also made light of his fellow travelers and the natives of the countries and regions that he visited, as well as his own expectations and reactions.

== Themes ==
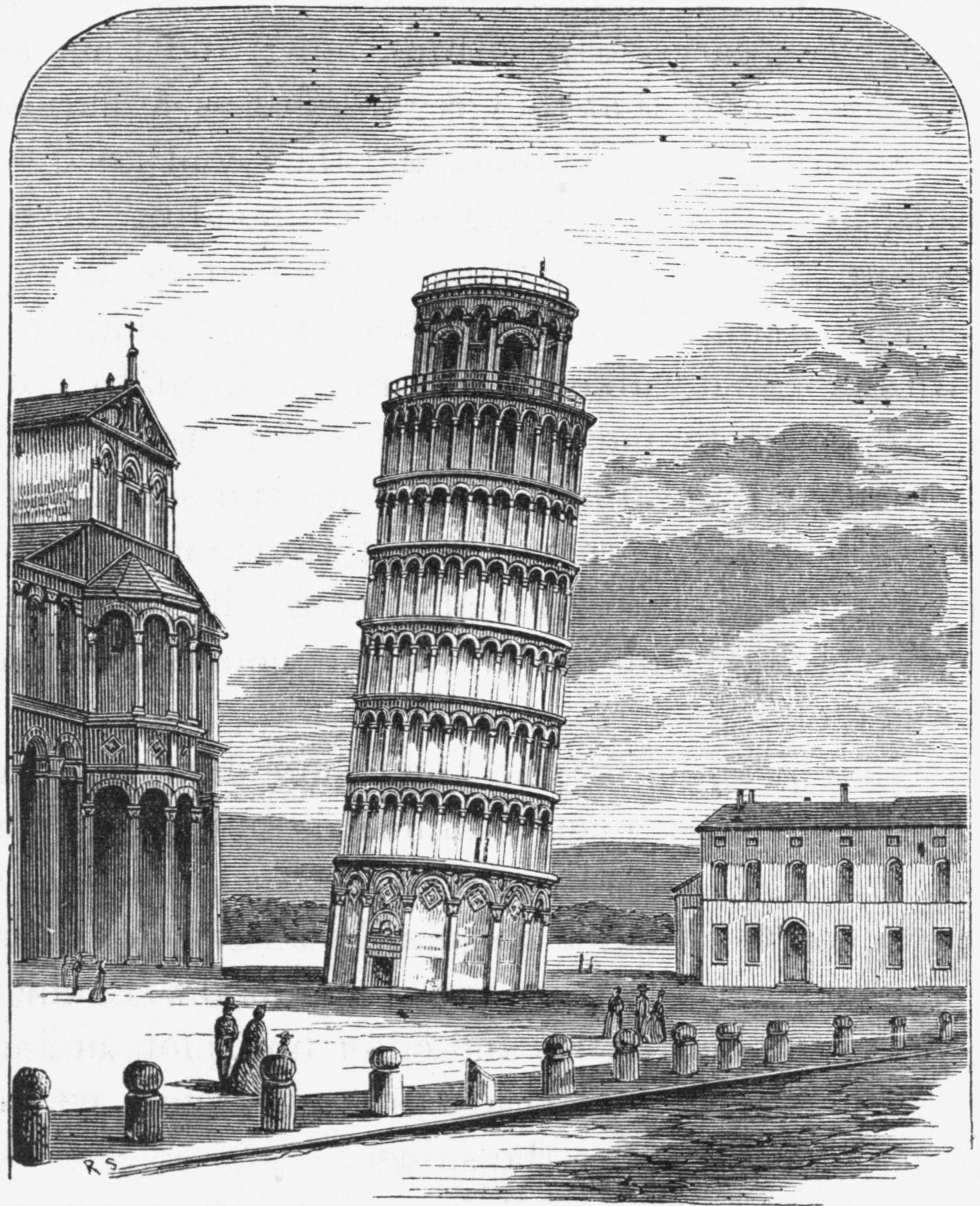
Illustration by True Williams: Leaning Tower

A major theme of the book is that of the conflict between history and the modern world. Twain continually encounters petty profiteering and trivializations of history as he journeys, as well as a strange emphasis placed on particular past events. He is either outraged, puzzled, or bored by each encounter. One example can be found in the sequence during which the boat has stopped at Gibraltar. On shore, the narrator hears seemingly dozens of people repeat an anecdote about how a particular hill nearby acquired its name, heedless of the fact that the anecdote is bland and pointless. Another example may be found in the discussion of the story of Abelard and Heloise, where the skeptical American deconstructs the story and comes to the conclusion that far too much fuss has been made about the two lovers. Only when the ship reaches areas of the world that do not exploit for profit or bore passers-by with inexplicable interest in their history, such as the early passage dealing with the ship's time at the Azores, is this attitude not found in the text.

This reaction to those who profit from the past is found, in an equivocal and unsure balance with reverence, in Twain's experiences in the Holy Land. The narrator reacts here, not only to the exploitation of the past and the unreasoning (to the American eye of the time) adherence to old ways, but also to the profanation of religious history. Many of his illusions are shattered, including his discovery that the nations described in the Old Testament could easily fit inside many American states and counties, and that the "kings" of those nations might very well have ruled over fewer people than could be found in some small towns. Disillusioned, he writes, "If all the poetry and nonsense that have been discharged upon the fountains and the bland scenery of this region were collected in a book, it would make a most valuable volume to burn."

This equivocal reaction to the religious history the narrator encounters may be magnified by the prejudices of the time, as the United States was still primarily a Protestant nation at that point. The Catholic Church, in particular, receives a considerable amount of attention from the narrator, specifically its institutionalized nature. This is particularly apparent in the section of the book dealing with Italy, where the poverty of the lay population and the relative affluence of the church are contrasted.

== Adaptations ==
In 1983, the PBS series Great Performances broadcast a television movie adaptation of The Innocents Abroad, starring Craig Wasson, David Ogden Stiers, Gigi Proietti, and Brooke Adams, directed by Luciano Salce.

== See also ==
- Travelogues of Palestine

== Reviews ==
- etext.virginia.edu Collection of Contemporary Reviews.
- Hirst, Robert H. "The Making of The Innocents Abroad : 1867–1872." Ph.D. diss., University of California, Berkeley, 1975.
- Howells, William Dean. The Innocents Abroad, or the New Pilgrims Progress, The Atlantic Monthly, December 1869.
- New York Evening Post (January 20, 1883).

== Secondary references ==
=== Mark Twain projects ===
- etext.virginia.edu -- Innocents Abroad Homepage
- Mark Twain Project at the University of California

=== On-line snippets ===
- Image of Mark Twain, on board ship in 1897, at 60 years old. (Twain traveled at age 32 and published Innocents Abroad in 1869, at the age of 34, but this image is sometimes associated with the earlier Twain.) For comparison, see 1871 image and 1875 (approx) image

=== Scholarly works ===
- Fulton, Joen B (2006). The Reverend Mark Twain: Theological Burlesque, Form, and Content. Columbus: Ohio State University Press. ISBN 0-8142-1024-4.
- Melton, Jeffrey Alan (2002). Mark Twain, travel books, and tourism : the tide of a great popular movement. Tuscaloosa: University of Alabama Press.
- Obenzinger, Hilton. American Palestine: Mark Twain and the Touristic Commodification of the Holy Land (working paper) (PDF).
- Obenzinger, Hilton (1999). American Palestine: Melville, Twain, and the Holy Land mania. Princeton University Press. ISBN 9780691009735.
- Rogers Stidham, Stephanie (2003). American Protestant Pilgrimage: Nineteenth-Century Impressions of Palestine (PDF). Princeton Theological Seminary: Koinonea XV.1. pp. 60–80.
- Steinbrink, Jeffrey (1991). Getting To Be Mark Twain. Berkeley: University of California Press. (covering the period from 1867 to 1871; Twain set sail on June 8, 1867, for a five-month Mediterranean tour on board the Quaker City; Innocents Abroad, detailing the Quaker City tour, was first published in 1869)
- Walker, Franklin Dickerson (1974). Irreverent Pilgrims: Melville, Browne, and Mark Twain in the Holy Land. Seattle and London: University of Washington Press. ISBN 0-295-95344-6.

== Primary sources ==
- Media related to The Innocents Abroad at Wikimedia Commons
- The full text of The Innocents Abroad at Wikisource, with illustrations by True Williams
- The Innocents Abroad at Standard Ebooks
- The Innocents Abroad at Project Gutenberg
- The Innocents Abroad public domain audiobook at LibriVox
- The Innocents Abroad, from Internet Archive. Illustrated, scanned original editions.
- Mark Twain Project at the University of California
- Innocents Abroad (with facsimiles of original illustrations) in Wright American Fiction 1851-1875
- Lexicon from Wordie, Words rounded up while reading The Innocents Abroad by Mark Twain
- McKeithan, Daniel Morley, ed., Traveling with the innocents abroad; Mark Twain's original reports from Europe and the Holy Land. Norman: University of Oklahoma Press, 1958.
- Passenger manifest of USS Quaker City, the ship that took the Innocents abroad.
  - on departure, as reported in June 9, 1867 New York Times
  - at ship's last port of call in St. George, Bermuda
- Correspondence markers (April 1867, June 1867, and November 1867) from the Mark Twain Project
  - 15 April 1867 correspondence, anticipating Holy Land trip
  - 7 June 1867 correspondence, anticipating imminent departure on 8 June 1867.
  - 20 November 1867 correspondence, on arriving in New York City.
