= Penny press =

Cheap newspapers manufactured in the US since the 1830s

Penny press newspapers were cheap, tabloid-style newspapers mass-produced in the United States from the 1830s onwards. Mass production of inexpensive newspapers became possible following the shift from hand-crafted to steam-powered printing. Famous for costing one cent (equivalent to $0.37 in 2025) while other newspapers cost around six cents, penny press papers were revolutionary in making the news accessible to middle class citizens for a reasonable price.

== History ==
- The NY Herald penny press

The Penny Press
- First Public Copy: Lynde M. Walter's Boston Transcript on July 24, 1830
- Well known examples: The Sun, The NY Herald
- Special Characteristics: Sold for one cent, which made it available to all classes
- Social Impact: As a less politically influenced newspaper, it published a wider range of opinions
- Selling Point: Simple vocabulary and diction meant easy comprehension by lower-class and less educated readers.

As the East Coast's middle and working classes grew, so did their desire for news. Penny papers emerged as a cheap source of news with coverage of crime, tragedy, adventure, and gossip. The penny papers represented the crudest form of journalism because of the sensational gossip that was reported.

The penny press was most noted for its price – only one cent per paper – while other contemporary newspapers were priced around six cents per issue. The exceptionally low price popularized the newspaper in America and extended the influence of the newspaper media to the poorer classes. The penny press made the news and journalism more important and also caused newspapers to begin to pay more attention to the public they served. Editors realized that the information that interested the upper class did not necessarily interest the penny-paying public. These new newspaper readers enjoyed the information about police and criminal cases. The main revenue for the penny press was advertising while other newspapers relied heavily on high-priced subscriptions to finance their activities.

The idea of a penny paper was not new in the 1830s. By 1826, many editors were experimenting with sports news, gossip, and cheap press.

Most newspapers in the early 19th century cost six cents and were distributed mostly through subscriptions. On July 24, 1830, the first penny press newspaper came to the market: Lynde M. Walter's Transcript in Boston, Massachusetts. Unlike most later penny papers, Walter's Transcript maintained what was considered good taste, featuring coverage of literature and the theater. This paper sold for a subscription of four dollars a year.

The penny paper's largest inspiration came from Charles Knight's The Penny Magazine (1832–1845). The main purpose of this magazine was to educate and improve England's poor, but it was also very popular with Americans. It became a very successful magazine as it attained a circulation of more than 20,000 copies within a year.

Frederic Hudson, one of the first to write about the history of American journalism, believed the rise of the penny press to be a key factor in the development of the modern newspaper. Hudson considered newspapers to be dull during the 1840s.

The penny press arrived in New York on January 1, 1833, when Horatio David Shepard teamed up with Horace Greeley and Francis W. Story and issued the Morning Post. Although both Greeley and Story went on to fame and fortune in the New York press world, the concept of bringing out a penny paper belonged exclusively to Shepard. He made a habit of taking daily walks through the teeming streets of the Bowery, where he observed merchants selling small items for a penny apiece. Other papers of the time were selling for six cents which allowed for a wider spread of people to read the Penny Press so they could afford it. He also took note of the fact that sales were brisk.

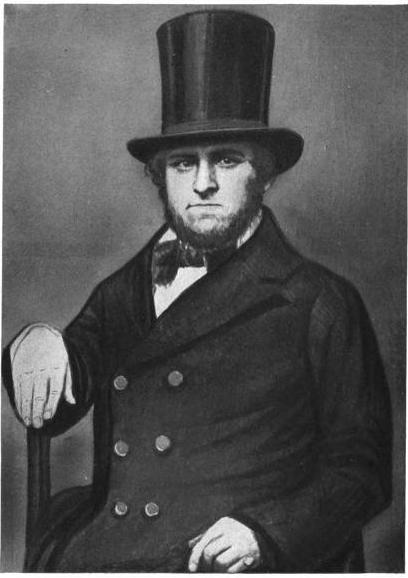
Benjamin H. Day, founder of the first penny press in the USA

Benjamin Henry Day (1810-1889), took the lead in profoundly transforming the daily newspaper in America. The newspaper went from narrowly focusing on the wealthy, with a sparse distribution, to a broad-based news medium. These changes were seen initially mostly in New York City, and spread to nearby Brooklyn, then up and down the East Coast, to Boston, Philadelphia, Baltimore and other Eastern Seaboard cities. Day introduced The Sun in New York, which appealed to a wide audience, using a simpler, more direct style, vivid language, and human interest stories. Day was a New Englander who worked for the Springfield, Massachusetts paper, the Republican. He came to New York to be a compositor, but during the Repression of 1833-1834, he started The Sun of New York City out of desperation. Day reasoned that a penny paper would be popular in hard times as many could not afford a six-cent paper. He also believed that a substantial, untapped market existed in the immigrant community. His paper was an instant success. Its motto, printed at the top of every page, was "The object of this paper is to lay before the public, at a price within the means of every one, all the news of the day, and at the same time offer an advantageous medium for advertisements." Day made advances in the writing and reporting news by introducing a new meaning of sensationalism, which was defined as 'reliance on human-interest stories. He placed emphasis on the common person as he or she was reflected in the political, educational, and social life of the day. Day also introduced a new way of selling papers by putting into practice the "London Plan". This plan included using young newsboys hawking their newspapers on the streets, soon greatly increasing circulation and decreasing costs for printing each copy.

The success of the penny papers was not automatic; selling the new concept of the newspaper to this new wider audience involved some persuasion. Consumers did not want to buy a new newspaper every day, and it was a challenge to convince them of the benefits of doing so. Most newspapers at the time did not have any sort of timeliness, so buying a newspaper daily seemed pointless to readers. But, eventually, people became interested in reading the latest news which the penny papers strove to provide.

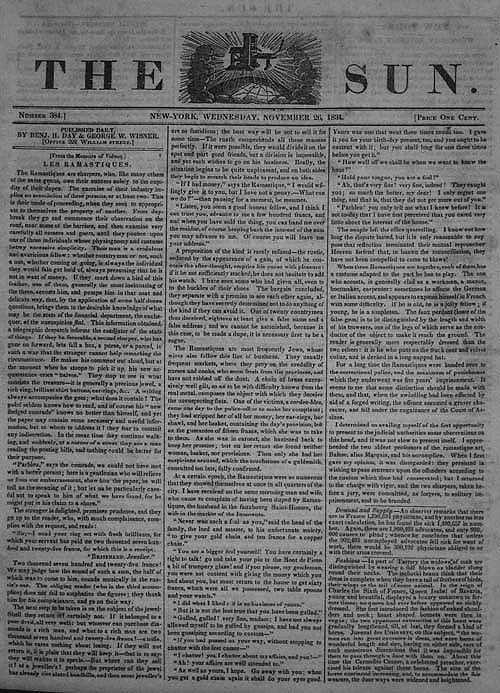
The Sun, Benjamin Day's paper

James Gordon Bennett's (1795-1872) subsequent 1835 founding of the New York Herald added another dimension to the new penny press newspapers, now common in journalistic practice. Whereas newspapers had generally relied on documents as sources, Bennett introduced the practices of observation and interviewing to provide stories with more vivid details. The senior Bennett is known for redefining the concept of news, reorganizing the news business, and introducing newspaper competition. Bennett's New York Herald was financially independent of politicians or political organizations and clubs thanks to a large number of advertisers. Bennett reported mainly local news and instances of corruption and strove for accuracy. He realized that "there was more journalistic money to be made in recording gossip that interested bar-rooms, work-shops, racecourses, and tenement houses, than in consulting the tastes of drawing rooms and libraries." He is also known for writing a "money page", which was included in the Herald, and also for his coverage of women in the news. His innovations sparked imitators as he spared nothing to get the news first.

Copying the idea of the Northern newspapers, in 1837, Francis Lumsden and George Wilkins Kendall established The Picayune further south on the Gulf of Mexico coast in New Orleans. The paper's initial price was one picayune, a Spanish coin equivalent to 6¼¢ (half a bit, or one-sixteenth of an American dollar of that time). Under Eliza Jane Nicholson, who inherited the struggling Louisiana paper when her husband died in 1876, the Picayune introduced innovations such as society reporting (known as the "Society Bee" columns), children's pages, and the first women's advice column, which was written by Dorothy Dix. Between 1880 and 1890, the paper more than tripled its circulation.

Horace Greeley, (1811-1872), publisher and founder of 1841's The New York Tribune, also had an extremely successful penny paper. He had been involved with the first penny paper in America several years before with Boston's Morning Post, which however was a failure. Instead of sensational stories, Greeley relied on rationalism in the Tribune. His editorial pages were the heart of his paper and the reason for its large influence. Greeley is also known for using his newspaper as a platform to promote the Whig Party philosophies and principles during its heyday of the 1840s and into the later new Republican Party of the 1850s.

Quite possibly the most famous penny press paper was started in 1851 by two men: George Jones (1811-1891), and Henry Raymond (1820-1869). This paper was originally named The New York Daily Times, but was later shortened to The New York Times in 1857. Originally sold at one cent per paper, it became famous for incorporating journalistic standards that are common today, as well as having very high-quality reporting and writing. The first issue of the New York Daily Times addressed the various speculations about its purpose and positions that preceded its release. It stated:

We shall be Conservative, in all cases where we think Conservatism essential to the public good;—and we shall be Radical in everything which may seem to us to require radical treatment and radical reform. We do not believe that everything in Society is either exactly right or exactly wrong;—what is good we desire to preserve and improve;—what is evil, to exterminate, or reform.

— New York Daily Times, 1st issue, 1851

== Political factors ==
Political and demographic changes were also significant. Much of the success of the newspaper in the early United States owed itself to the attitude of the Founding Fathers toward the press. Many of them saw a free press as one of the most essential elements in maintaining the liberty and social equality of citizens. Thomas Jefferson said he considered a free press as even more important than the government itself: "Were it left to me to decide whether we should have a government without newspapers, or newspapers without a government, I should not hesitate any moment to prefer the latter." It was because of his attitude that freedom of the press gained mention in the First Amendment to the Constitution, and though early politicians, including Jefferson, occasionally made attempts to rein in the press, newspapers flourished in the new nation

However, the penny press was originally apolitical both in content and in attitude. As Michael Schudson describes in Discovering the News, the Sun once replaced their congressional news section with this statement: "The proceedings of Congress thus far, would not interest our readers." The major social-political changes brought on by the development of the penny press were themselves helped by the penny press' focus on working-class people and their interests. Thus an apolitical attitude was, ironically, a political factor influencing the advancement of the penny press.

The founders of the penny press popularized both low prices for newspapers and newspaper economics based on sales instead of political party backing. Benjamin Day created The Sun without any political party backing. This was rare because this was an era where political parties sponsored newspapers. On the other hand, Horace Greeley used his newspaper, the New-York Tribune, as a platform for Whig politics.

== Approach to reporting ==
In the early 1800s, newspapers were largely for the elite and took two forms – mercantile sheets that were intended for the business community and contained ship schedules, wholesale product prices, advertisements and some stale foreign news, and political newspapers that were controlled by political parties or their editors as a means of sharing their views with elite stakeholders. Journalists reported the party line and editorialized in favor of party positions. The emergence of the penny press greatly influenced communication technologies by covering news outside those of government interests. The first penny paper, the Sun, was founded in New York in September 1833. After that time, newspapers became nonpartisan since they were not supported by political parties. Penny papers hired reporters and correspondents to seek out and write the news, while at the same time, started to sound more journalistic than editorial. Reporters were assigned to beats and were involved in the conduct of local interaction. The penny press contributed to changes in newspaper content and structure. New journalism practices resulted in the development of concepts such as news reporting, emphasizing the importance of timeliness, and appealing to wider audiences. These newspapers, though not completely uninfluenced by political parties and their views, were self-funded and not party-funded. This allowed them to shift allegiance on political issues that the papers dealt with quite easily, which also aided in their success and acceptance by the general public.

Since these newspapers were not politically funded, the core interests of the journalists themselves were obviously quite different from competing newspaper agencies that had heavy political influence. The largest portion of demand was from immigrants, traditional middle-class citizens, and nascent literate classes; journalists kept articles concise and engaging with real-life topics readers could relate to, and did so with less sophisticated vocabulary so readers would not require higher education to understand the articles. The penny press formula is the combination of sensational news with mass market appeal, large-scale industrial production, and economies of scale used in combination with neutrality and objectivity to create a paper that gets its point across without taking sides. Also, journalist-incorporated advertisements treated readers as consumers instead of another market for demand, in an effort to establish a relationship between paper and reader that was less about work and the economy and more about relaxation and reading for pleasure and relaxation.

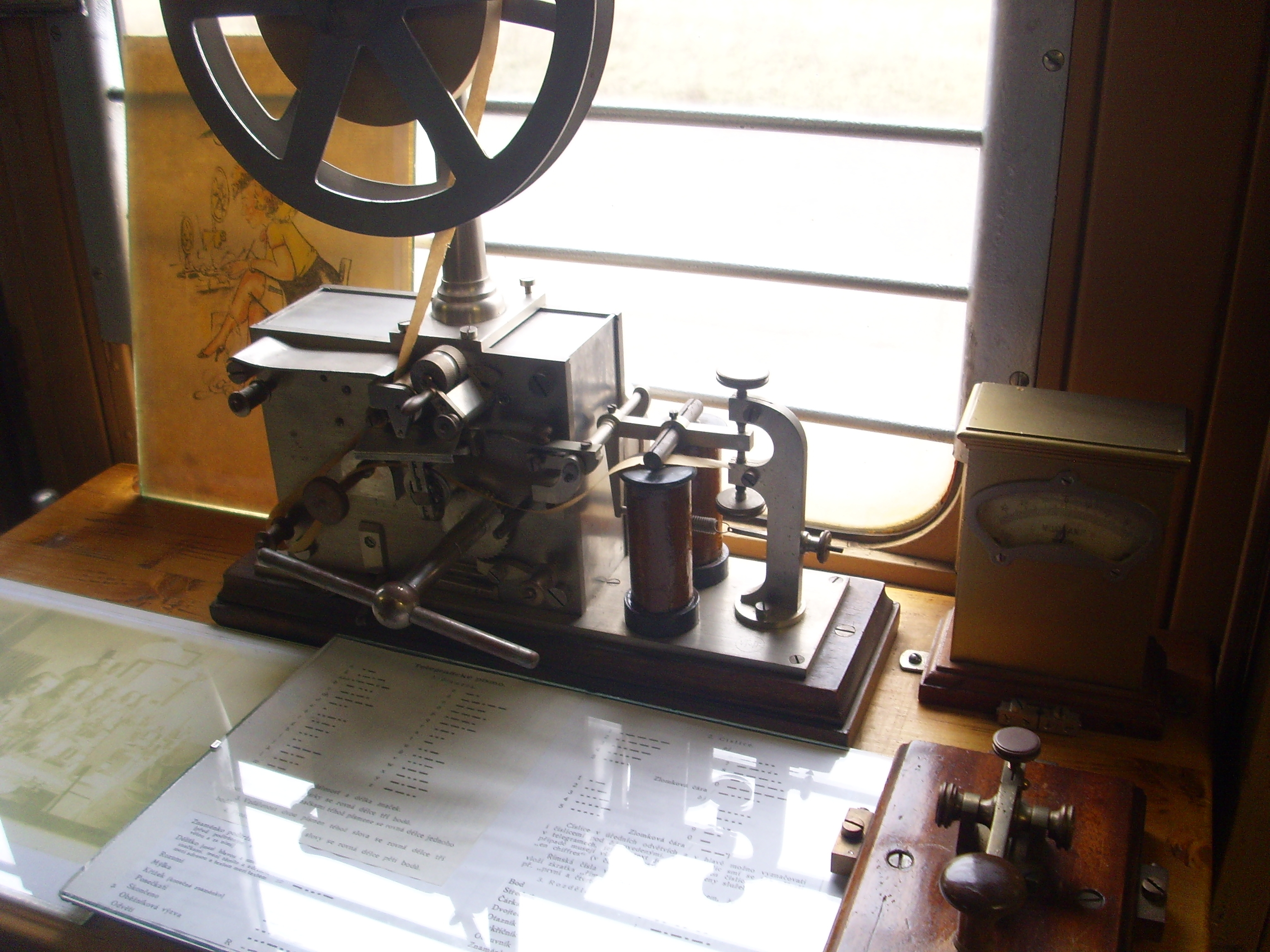
Some reporters used the electric telegraph to share information.

The penny press newspapers became more widely read because journalists made the effort to keep their content understandable to less educated audiences. They also focused on investigating topics with more factual-based information rather than opinion-based articles, which gave the paper a less biased form of news than the elite newspapers, which were often published by those with special interests. News items and stories were also shorter than those found in elite papers. It was also believed that the working-class audiences would not have enough free time to read longer editorials, hence the shorter and more concise editorials. Human interest stories were also popular with the penny press audiences. Such items took up more space compared to earlier, more expensive papers that used human interest stories more as filler content. The New York penny papers were particularly known for publishing stories about interesting personalities and covering different aspects of the human condition. To connect with the urban, mostly working-class readership, New York reporters wrote about ordinary people and their experiences. They also wrote about the stock market, entertainers, politics, sports, and weather, all of which became important news and are still considered absolute necessities in a newspaper, thanks to the penny press. Reporters strove to deliver news in a timely manner and sometimes relied on the electric telegraph to gather and share information. Penny press journalists were the first people to report on crises and crime news, something that has become a staple in newspapers since. Continuing reports on the same story were introduced in penny press papers and were read by thousands of people on the same day. This, in combination with the speed of news delivery and thoroughness in the coverage of local news, forever changed the direction of American journalism.

== See also ==
- Dime novel
- Muckraker
- Penny dreadful
