= London Plan (newspapers) =

System of newspaper distribution

The London plan is a largely antiquated system of newspaper distribution in which the paper carriers buy newspapers in bulk from the publisher and sell the papers to the reading public for a profit. The plan was imported from London to the United States by Benjamin Day in the nineteenth century.

The New York newsboys' strike of 1899 was organized by newsboys who purchased papers on the London plan, after the New York City newspapers raised their price by 10 cents per 100 papers. This event in turn inspired the Disney musical Newsies.
