= James Mahony =

Irish artist and engraver (1810–1879)

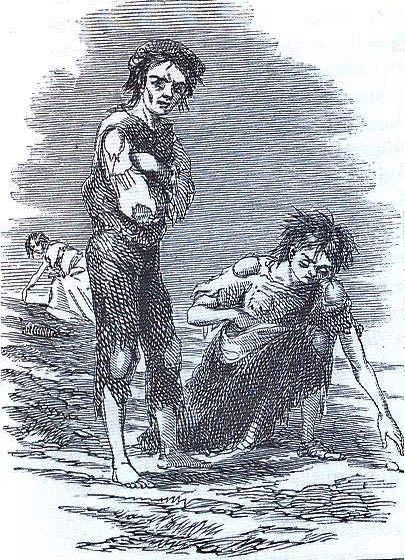
The Great Irish Famine of 1845-1849, caused by potato blight. Skibbereen engraving by James Mahony, 1847

James Mahony or Mahoney (1810–1879) was a leading nineteenth century Irish artist and engraver.

His father was a joiner in Cork, Ireland, and little is known of his early life. He seems to have studied painting and drawing in Rome, travelling in Italy and France until aged 32 when he returned to Cork. He quickly became known for his watercolour paintings, with townscapes from Rome, Venice, Paris, and Rouen.

His work included "highly romantic" engravings of scenes from Irish life, such as of the Great Irish Famine and of Saint Patrick's Day, the national day of Ireland. His famine sketches, drawn on the spot in Skibbereen and Clonakilty in West Cork, commissioned by and published in the Illustrated London News, roused public opinion to persuade the British government to take action to alleviate the famine.

In 1853, he painted a major work, The Visit by Queen Victoria and Prince Albert to the Fine Art Hall of the Irish Industrial Exhibition, at the Irish Industrial Exhibition in Dublin. In 1856, he was made an associate of the Royal Hibernian Academy (ARHA), where he exhibited until he moved to London. He exhibited watercolours there at the Royal Academy between 1866 and 1877, working as a freelance illustrator for the Illustrated London News. He prepared illustrations, too, for other journals, newspapers and books including an edition of the works of Charles Dickens. He died in London.
