= Benjamin Henry Day Jr. =

American illustrator and printer (1838–1916)

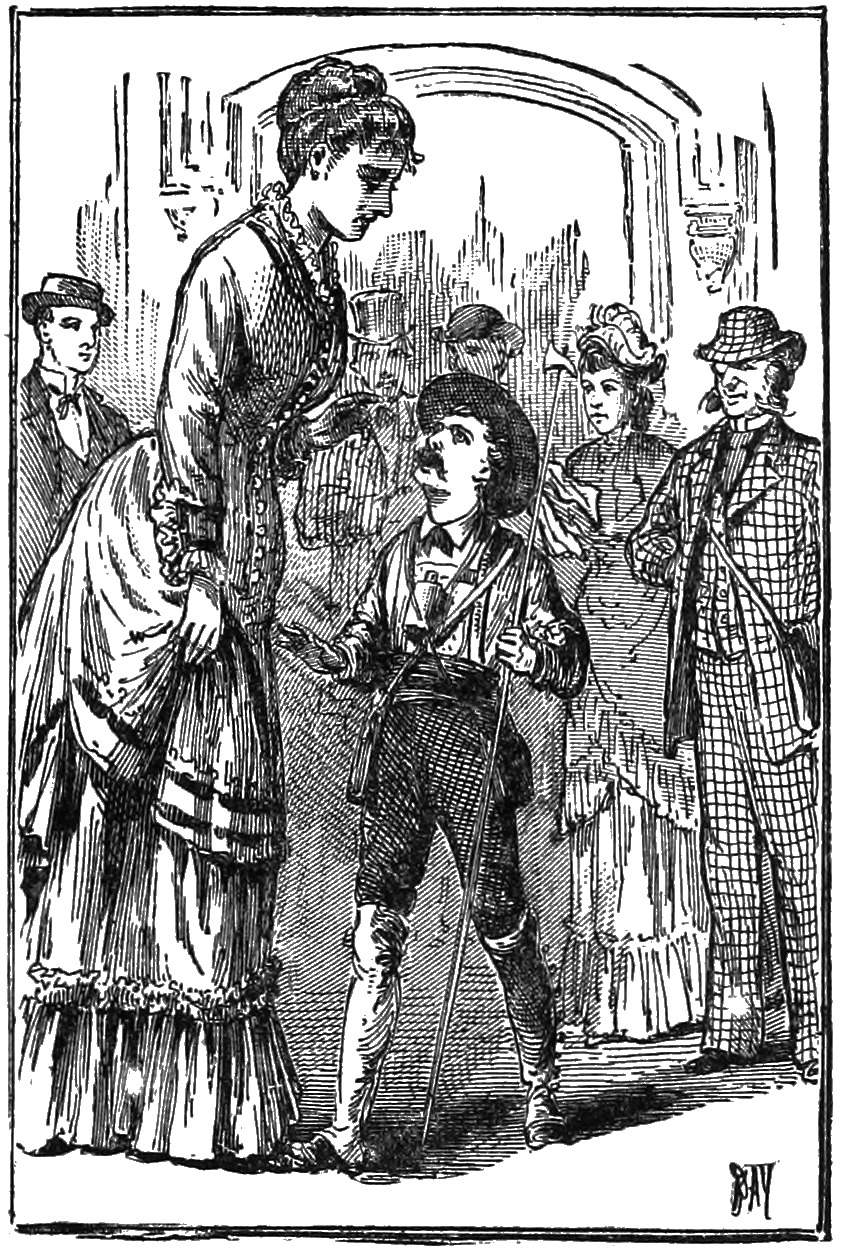
Model for an Empress, in A Tramp Abroad, p. 393, 1880

Benjamin Henry Day Jr. (March 7, 1838 – August 30, 1916) was an American illustrator and printer, best known for his invention of Ben-Day dots.

Day was the son of Benjamin Henry Day, an American newspaper publisher best known for founding The Sun, the first penny press newspaper in the United States, in 1833. He was born in New York City, studied in Paris, and after returning to the United States worked for Leslie's, Harper's Weekly and similar publications. He also contributed to the humorous weekly magazine Vanity Fair.

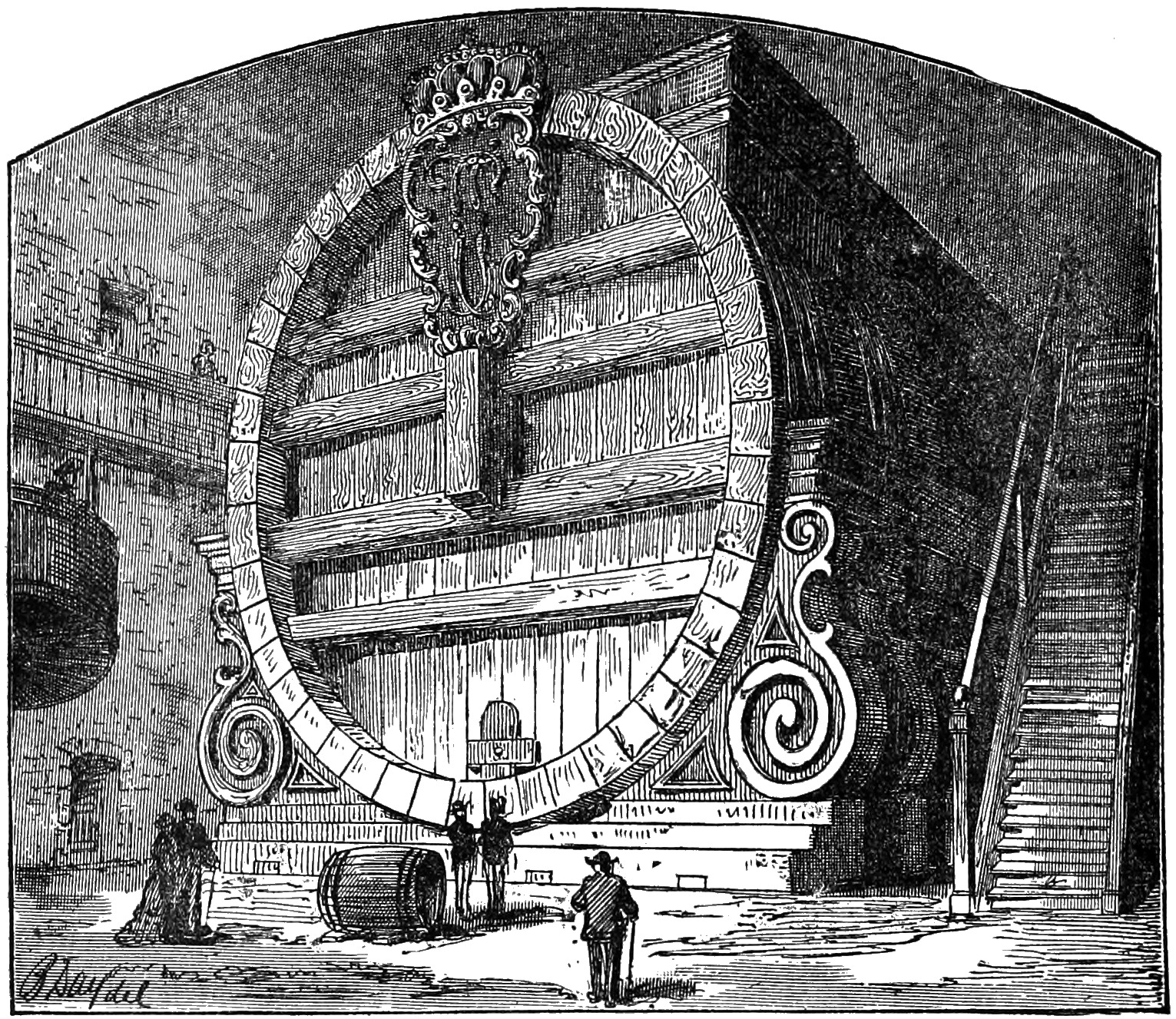
Great Heidelberg Tun, in A Tramp Abroad, Appendix B on Heidelberg Castle, 1880

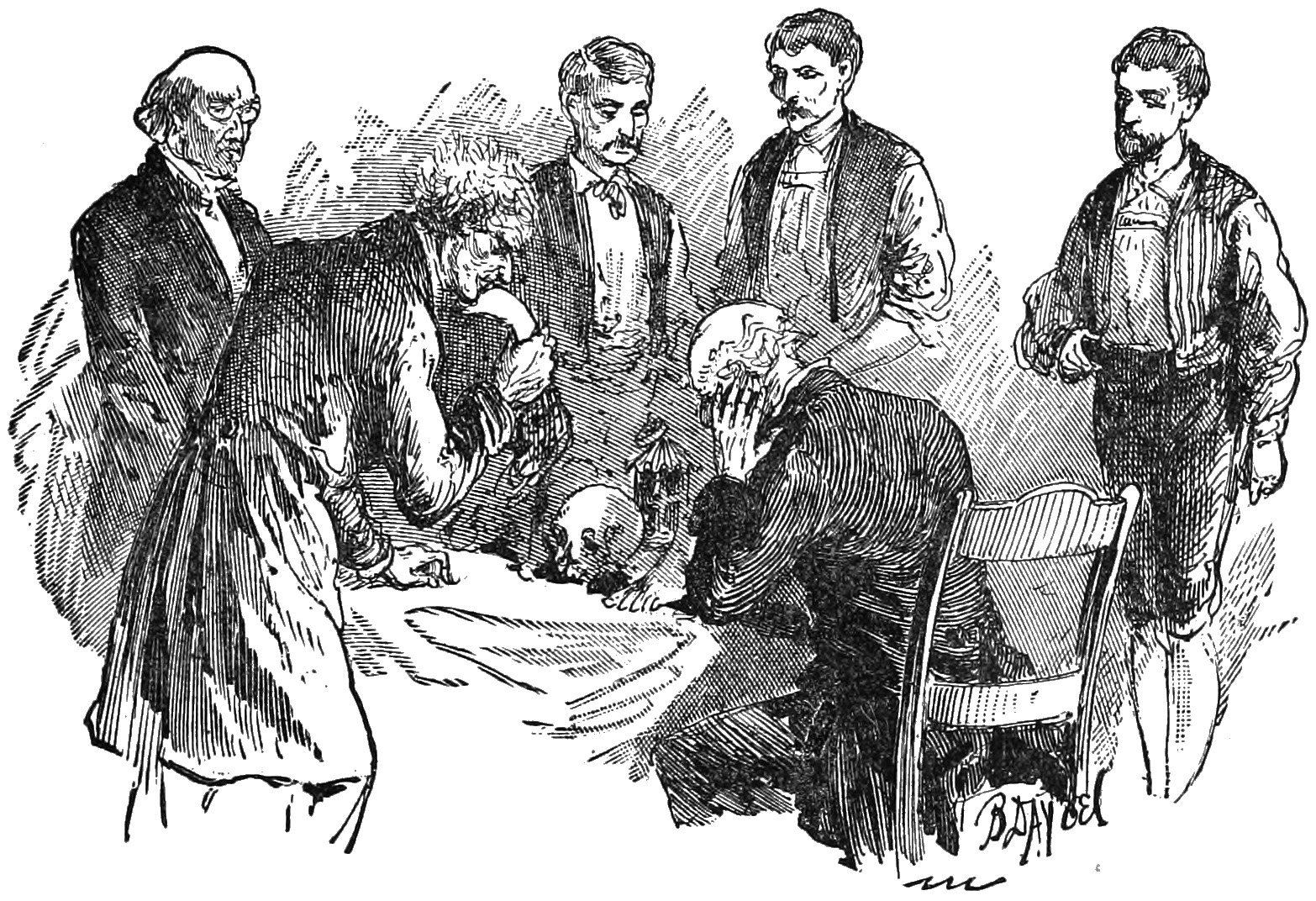
Unexpected Meeting of Friends, in A Tramp Abroad, p. 469 about the remains of "Pierre Balmat", 1880

The Mark Twain book A Tramp Abroad contains more than 20 pictures by Day.

He married Maria Theresa Miller around 1859, who died in 1875. They had two sons, Benjamin H. (April 11, 1860 – October 17, 1905) and Charles Shepherd (1866 – January 26, 1900).

In 1878, Day was remarried to Rebecca Augusta Avery (June 27, 1844 – January 10, 1926), with whom he had two daughters (Florence and Helen).

In 1908, he moved to Summit, New Jersey and built a large studio. He died at his home in Summit on August 30, 1916, at the age of 78.
