= Benjamin Henry Day =

American newspaper publisher (1810–1889)

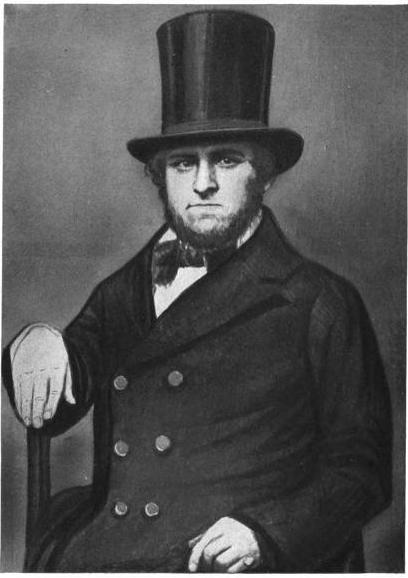
- Born: April 10, 1810; Springfield, Massachusetts, US
- Died: December 21, 1889 (aged 79); New York City, US
- Occupation: Newspaper publisher
- Children: 3, including Benjamin

Benjamin Henry Day (April 10, 1810 – December 21, 1889) was an American newspaper publisher who founded The Sun, the first penny press newspaper in the United States, in 1833.

== Biography ==
Day was born in Springfield, Massachusetts, on April 10, 1810, to Henry Day, a hatter, and Mary Ely. Day started his printing career in 1824, at the Springfield Republican.

In 1835, Day's Sun was responsible for publishing a story written by Richard Adams Locke about life on the Moon that was fictional, but was received by the general public as fact. The publicity of the article was widespread at the time and now is referred to as "The Great Moon Hoax". Day is credited with stretching the truth that came to be known as sensationalism. Day is also credited for importing to the United States the London Plan, a system of newspaper distribution largely antiquated today in which the paper carriers buy newspapers in bulk from the publisher and sell the papers to the reading public for a profit.

Day sold the Sun to his brother-in-law Moses Yale Beach for $40,000 in 1838. Afterwards he started the True Sun in 1840, which had but a brief run. In 1842, he created the Brother Jonathan, the first illustrated weekly in the U.S., which he ran for twenty years.

Day constantly quarreled with George Wisner over the publication of abolitionist articles. Day considered himself democratic to Wisner's extreme abolitionist standpoint.

From The New Yorker:

The American newspaper business as we know it was born on September 3, 1833, when a twenty-three-year-old publisher named Benjamin Day put out the first edition of the New York Sun. Whereas other papers sold for five or six cents, the Sun cost just a penny. For revenue, Day relied on advertising rather than on subscriptions. Above all, he revolutionized the way papers were distributed. He sold them to newsboys (Note: Day employed the future actor Barney Williams as his first, and for a time, only newsboy.) in lots of a hundred to hawk in the street. Before long, Day was the most important publisher in New York.

Day married Evelina Shepard (b. 1811) in 1831, and had four children: Henry (b. 1832), Mary Ely Day (1833–38), Benjamin Henry Day Jr. (1838–1916), the inventor of Ben-Day dots, and Clarence Shephard Day (1844–1927), a stockbroker (and father of author Clarence Shephard, Jr.).

== Sources ==
- Britannica.com
- Whitby, Gary L. (1990). "Horns of a Dilemma: The Sun, Abolition, and the 1833–34 New York Riots". Journalism Quarterly. 67 (2): 410–419. doi:10.1177/107769909006700218.
