= Ben Day process =

Printing and photoengraving technique (1879)

Ben Day dots

The Ben Day process is a printing and photoengraving technique for producing areas of gray or (with four-color printing) various colors by using fine patterns of ink on the paper. It was developed in 1879 by illustrator and printer Benjamin Henry Day Jr. (son of 19th-century publisher Benjamin Henry Day). The process is commonly described in terms of Ben Day dots, but other shapes can be used, such as parallel lines or textures.

Depending on the effect, color or optical illusion needed, small colored dots are closely spaced, widely spaced, or overlapping. Magenta dots, for example, are widely spaced to create pink, or an interleaved pattern of cyan and yellow dots might be used to produce a medium green. The technique has been widely used in color comic books, especially in the mid 20th century, to inexpensively create shading and secondary colors.

The process differs from the halftone dots, which can vary continuously in size to produce gradations of shading or color, and are commonly produced from photographs. Ben Day dots are of equal size and distribution across a specific area, and are commonly applied to line art or graphic designs. To apply the dots, the artist would cut the appropriate shapes from transparent overlay sheets, which were available in a wide variety of dot sizes and dot distribution, to provide a range of tones to use. When photographically reproduced as a line cut for letterpress printing, the areas of Ben Day overlay provided the effect of tonal shading to the printing plate.

Ben Day dots have been used deliberately, usually to evoke their use in color comics. They were a hallmark of American artist Roy Lichtenstein, who enlarged and exaggerated them in many of his paintings and sculptures to evoke the printing technique used in the comic book illustrations he commonly copied. The animated series Spider-Verse (2018–present) uses a variety of visual styles, including illustrations with visible Ben Day dots.

== See also ==
- Dither
- Hatching (heraldry), the representation of color by monochrome lines.
- Letratone
- Pointillism
- Polka dot
