= Crak! =

Lithograph by Roy Lichtenstein

- Artist: Roy Lichtenstein
- Year: 1963
- Medium: Lithograph
- Movement: Pop art
- Dimensions: 48.9 cm × 70.2 cm (19.25 in × 27.625 in)

Crak! (sometimes Crack!) is a 1963 pop art lithograph by Roy Lichtenstein in his comic book style of using Ben-Day dots and a text balloon. It was used in marketing materials for one of Lichtenstein's early shows. It is one of several of his works related to military art and monocular vision.

== Background ==
The source of Crak! is a story from Star Spangled War Stories #102. © April–May 1962, National Periodical Publications (DC).

When Lichtenstein had his first solo show at The Leo Castelli Gallery in New York City in February 1962, it sold out before opening. The exhibition included Engagement Ring, Blam and The Refrigerator. The show ran from February 10 through March 3, 1962. After a west coast exhibition at Ferus Gallery in Los Angeles from April 1–27, 1963, Lichtenstein had his second solo exhibition at the Leo Castelli Gallery from September 28 – October 24, 1963 that included Whaam!, Drowning Girl, Torpedo...Los!, Baseball Manager, In the Car, and Conversation.

Named for its onomatopoeic graphic text, Crak! is an offset lithograph on lightweight, white wove paper. According to the Lichtenstein Foundation, it was a marketing poster that "was published to announce Lichtenstein's exhibition at Leo Castelli Gallery, September 28 [–] October 24, 1963." The foundation notes that the work is sometimes dated 1964 with numbered impressions that are inscribed reflecting that date.

The screen-printed poster image presents a beret-clad woman shooting a rifle. Lichtenstein recomposed the comic book source — from a story written by Bob Haney and illustrated by Jack Abel in Star Spangled War Stories #102 (Apr./May 1962) — by replacing the mound of sand with what seems to be a stack of sandbags. He also isolated the figure by cropping the foreground and background elements.

According to art historian Michael Lobel, monocular vision is the motif in which the subject is "depicted frontally in such a way as to expose both eyes to the viewer, yet which has one eye closed or otherwise obscured" and not those in which the subject is depicted in profile. The main subject has one eye opened and one eye closed, which relates to a pervasive theme of monocularity in Lichtenstein's art that Lobel was the first to analyze, which also includes works such as Torpedo...Los! and I Can See the Whole Room...and There's Nobody in It! The work also is related to Lichtenstein's theme of "machine and embodied vision" as exhibited in works such as Okay Hot-Shot, Okay!, Bratatat!, and Jet Pilot.

== See also ==
- 1963 in art
