= Swipe (comics) =

Uncredited copy of part of a comic book

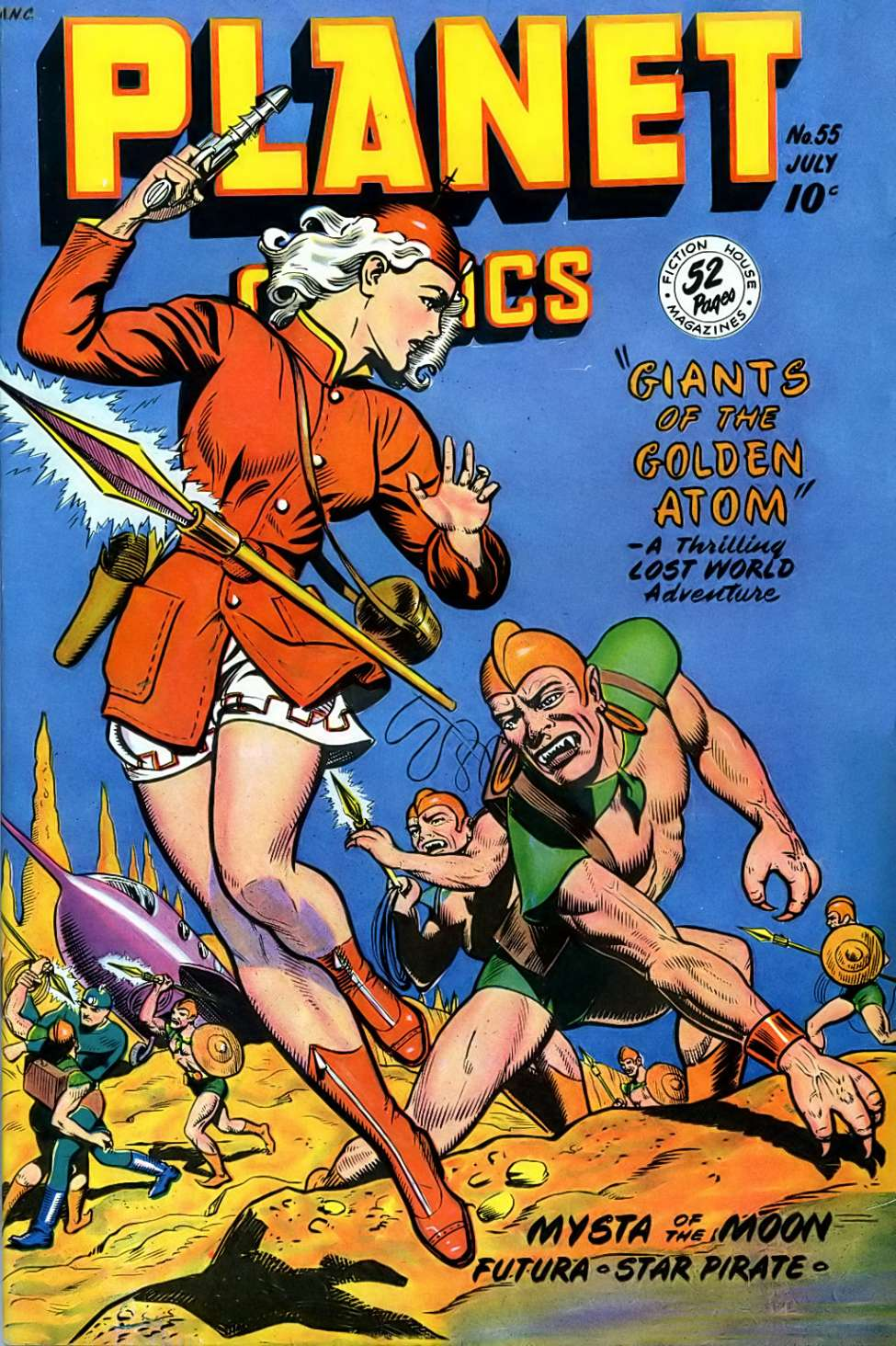
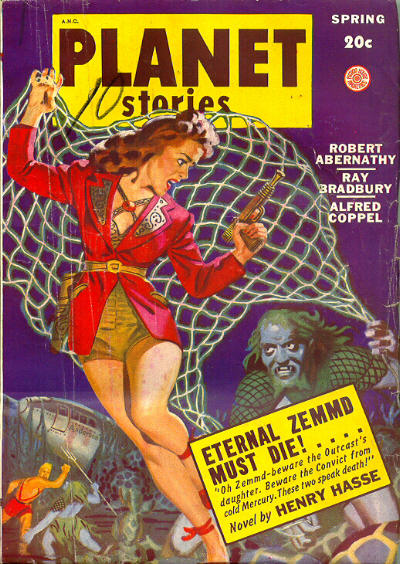
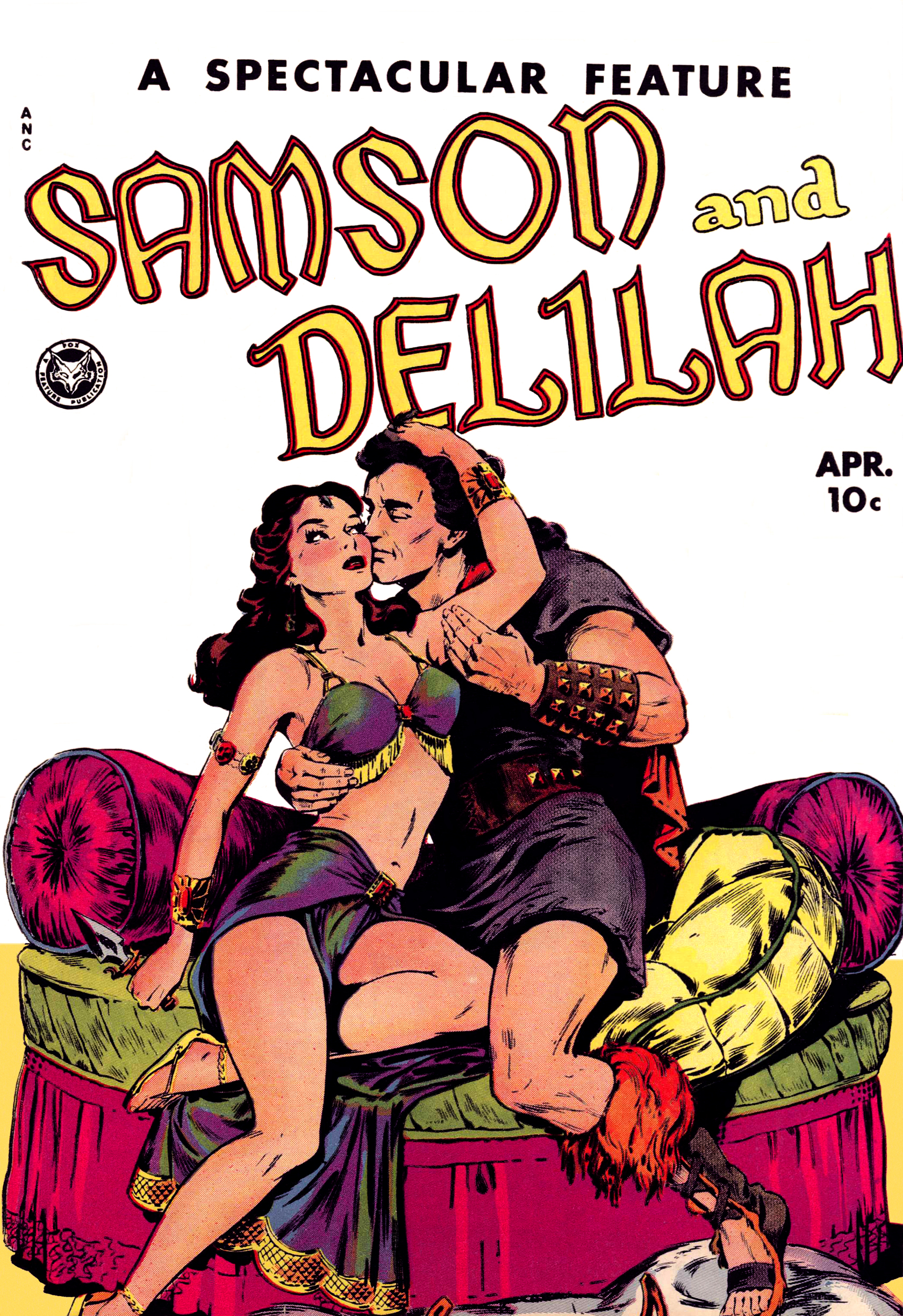
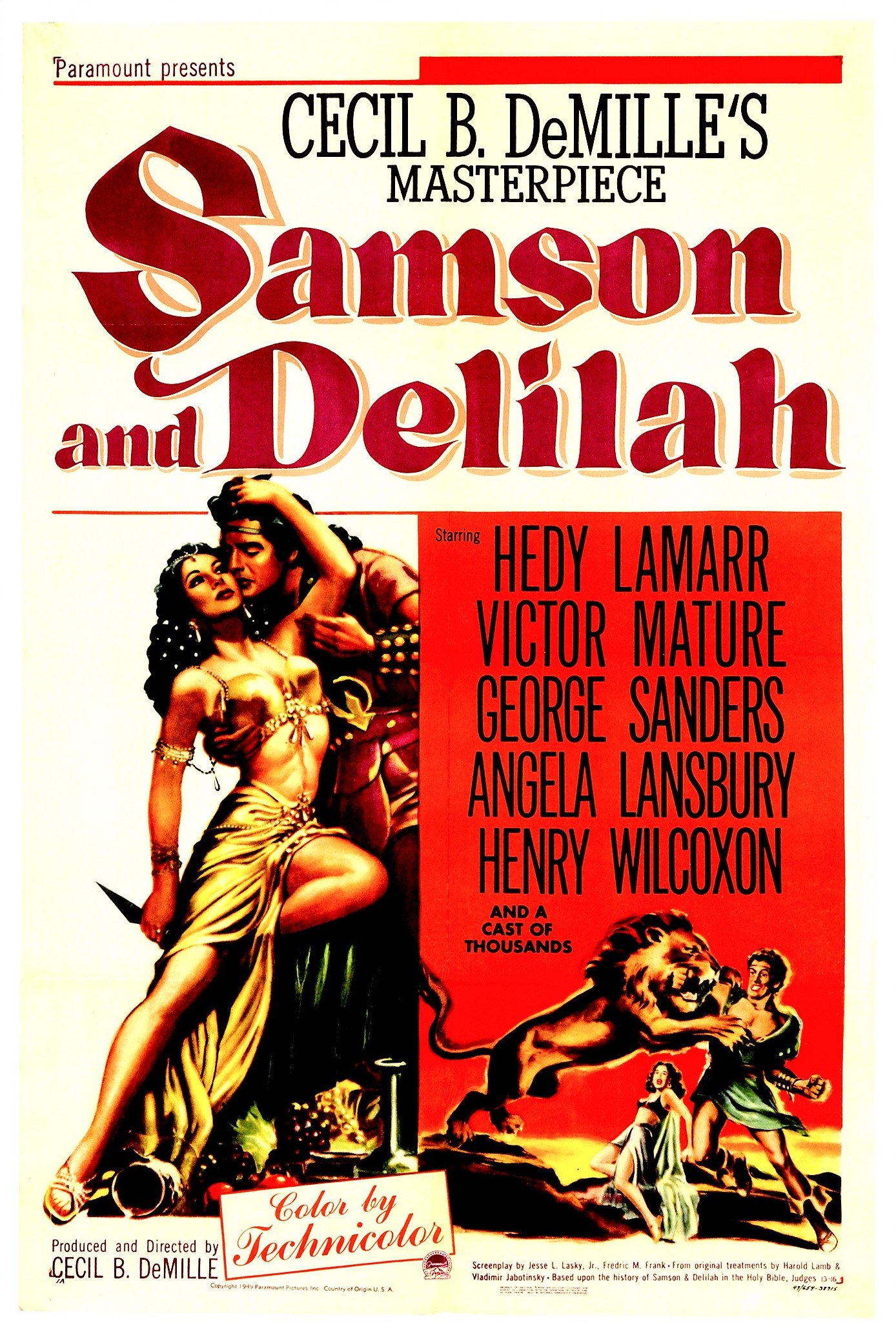
Recycling figurework was common practice during the Golden Age of Comics.

Swipe is a comics term for the intentional copying of a cover, panel, or page from an earlier comic book or graphic novel without crediting the original artist.

== Overview ==
Artists Jack Kirby, Neal Adams, Hergé, and Jim Lee are common targets of swipes, though even those artists may not be above reproach; Kirby was known to have swiped from Hal Foster early in his career. Similarly, many Golden Age artists kept "swipe files" of material to be copied as needed. Certain contemporary artists have become notorious for their swiping, including Rich Buckler (who favors Neal Adams and Jack Kirby), Rob Liefeld (many artists), Keith Giffen (José Antonio Muñoz), and Roger Cruz (Jim Lee and Joe Madureira).

There is a long tradition in comics of using fine art as "inspiration" as well. Most observers do not consider this as objectionable as swiping from another cartoonist's work. Examples include Art Spiegelman swiping an image of the Russian artist M. Mazruho's in Maus, Eddie Campbell swiping Diego Velázquez, and Jill Thompson swiping the work of Arthur Rackham.

Cartoonists have also swiped images from mass media and commercial art. Examples include Batman creator Bob Kane repeatedly swiping from early 20th-century illustrator Henry Vallely, Greg Land repeatedly swiping pornography as well as many popular comic book artists, 2000 AD artist Mick Austin swiping an image of Toni Shilleto's from Mayfair: Entertainment for Men, Jon J. Muth swiping a 1940s photograph, and David Chelsea swiping from Spanish pornography. Sometimes the swiping happens "in reverse", as in the example of an illustration from Organic Gardening magazine swiping the iconic Kirby cover for Fantastic Four #1.

Swiping brings to mind the amusing conundrum of whether an artist can swipe from himself. One example is two almost-identical Peanuts strips by Charles Schulz done almost ten years apart. Another comic strip-related ethics question was invoked by latter-day Nancy artists Guy & Brad Gilchrist swiping Nancy creator Ernie Bushmiller.

== "Cloning" ==
Though not technically swiping, some artists have made a career "cloning" other artists. Phil Jimenez has been quite open about his work being modeled on George Pérez's, though he has never been accused of directly swiping a Pérez drawing. Bryan Hitch started off as an Alan Davis "clone". Bill Sienkiewicz's early work was blatantly derivative of Neal Adams, as was Tom Grindberg's, Michael Netzer (Nasser)'s, and Mike Grell's. Industry veteran Dick Giordano maintained that cloning is not only acceptable, but actually preferable, when an artist fills in for a regular artist on a title.

== Appropriation ==
Pop artist Roy Lichtenstein made a splash in the 1960s with his "appropriations" based on the work of Kirby, Russ Heath, Tony Abruzzo, Irv Novick, John Romita Sr., and Jerry Grandenetti, who rarely received any credit. Jack Cowart, executive director of the Lichtenstein Foundation, contests the notion that Lichtenstein was a copyist, saying: "Roy's work was a wonderment of the graphic formulae and the codification of sentiment that had been worked out by others. The panels were changed in scale, color, treatment, and in their implications. There is no exact copy." Comics industry figures don't have such a sanguine attitude about Lichtenstein's swipes.

Similarly, Canadian artist Kevin Mutch once drew an entire comic book entirely based on swipes. Mutch's 1993 comic Captain Adam was a "narrative collage" of images and texts from over fifty separate Silver Age and Bronze Age comics, randomly put together to form an original story.

== Pastiches ==
Comics pastiches are blatant uses of swipes, cloning, and appropriation, usually using the same characters as the original source. French-Canadian cartoonist Yves Rodier is known for his many Adventures of Tintin pastiches, as is the anonymously written comic book The Adventures of Tintin: Breaking Free. In his Masterpiece Comics series, American cartoonist R. Sikoryak cleverly mixes exact cloning of famous cartoonists' styles with classic literary texts, creating unique comics "mash-ups". Alan Moore and Rick Veitch's 1963 series is another example of pastiche in comics form, as are the many take-offs of the Charles Atlas ads found in old comic books.

== Homages ==
In comics, it is understood that the difference between a swipe and an "homage" is generally whether the source is directly acknowledged — as opposed to being exposed by a third party. Throughout the history of the medium, artists have engaged in homages – most often of well-known cover images like Action Comics No. 1, Detective Comics No. 27, Amazing Fantasy No. 15, and Fantastic Four No. 1. (John Byrne is particularly fond of doing homages to the latter, having produced at least seven versions to date.) Some observers find homages as objectionable as swiping.

== Swiping watchdogs ==
From 1991 until at least 1997, the industry magazine The Comics Journal kept a "Swipe File" which documented perceived swipes in the comics field, a tradition that continues on the TCJ website.

== Artists accused of swiping ==
Alleged Swiper	Source	Notes
Michael Allred	David Chelsea	Allred denied the charges.
Chester Brown	Joe Orlando	
Rich Buckler	Neal Adams	Buckler has a dubious reputation as one of comics' top "swipe" artists, with his early work in particular filled with "homages" to artists like Jack Kirby, John Buscema, and Neal Adams. After being publicly accused of the practice by The Comics Journal in the early 1980s, Buckler denied the charges and sued the magazine for libel; he later dropped the suit.
Rich Buckler	Jack Kirby	Buckler has a dubious reputation as one of comics' top "swipe" artists, with his early work in particular filled with "homages" to artists like Jack Kirby, John Buscema, and Neal Adams. After being publicly accused of the practice by The Comics Journal in the early 1980s, Buckler denied the charges and sued the magazine for libel; he later dropped the suit.
Charles Burns	Hergé	
Denys Cowan	Gil Kane	
Glyn Dillon	Jaime Hernandez	
Steve Ditko	Will Eisner	
Ron Frenz	Jack Kirby	
Keith Giffen	José Antonio Muñoz	Giffen has acknowledged Muñoz's influence, and in 2000 referred to the controversy this way: "I had a bad incident with studying somebody's work very closely at one point, and I resolved never, ever to do it again. I can get so immersed in somebody's work that I start turning into a Xerox machine and it's not good. . . . There was no time I was sitting there tracing or copying, no. Duplicating, pulling out of memory and putting down on paper after intense study, absolutely." In 1986 Giffen was one of the most popular comic book artists in the industry. The ensuing swiping controversy hurt Giffen's reputation.
Bob Kane	Alex Raymond	The classic Batman pose on the cover of Detective Comics No. 27 (the first appearance of Batman) is swiped from a 1937 Alex Raymond drawing of Flash Gordon.
Gil Kane	Jack Kirby	
Jack Kirby	Hal Foster	
Peter Kuper	Rius	
Peter Kuper	Ralph Steadman	
Alan Kupperberg	Gil Kane	
Roy Lichtenstein	Irv Novick, Bruno Premiani, Jerry Grandenetti, Russ Heath	
Rob Liefeld	Brent Anderson	
Rob Liefeld	John Byrne	
Rob Liefeld	Frank Miller	
Rob Liefeld	George Pérez	
Rob Liefeld	Ron Wilson	
David W. Mack	Adam Hughes	Mack admitted the Hughes swipes online: ". . . About the reference to Adam Hughes, yeah, I owe him credit here too. When preparing for the look of this book, I wanted to really embrace the comic book look of things while keeping things looking realistic as well, and I'm a big fan of Adam's ability to do that, . . . and I was looking at a lot of his work, among others, as a kind of training wheels in considereing [sic] styles, and getting started on this issue. . . . This was one of the first pages that I drew in this issue, getting into the vibe for the series and you may be right that I referenced it too heavily. Sometimes when you are getting rolling on a project it takes a few pages to work the influences out of your system. So props to Adam, you have to give credit where credit is due. . . ."
Todd McFarlane	Otomo Katsuhiro	
Joe Phillips	Barry Windsor-Smith	
Joe Simon	John Prentice	The stories "Man in the House" from Young Romance #101 (August-September 1959) and "Take Me Back" from All for Love #16 (October-November 1959), both credited to Joe Simon, are swipes of entire Prentice-drawn stories "The Irresistible Bum" from Young Romance #72 (August 1954) and "One More Time" from First Love Illustrated #41 (June 1954), respectively.
Andi Watson	Mike Allred	

== See also ==
- Comic strip switcheroo
- Comics vocabulary
- Bricolage
- Doujinshi
- Fan fiction
- Homage
- Parody
- Pastiche
- Remix culture
