= M-Maybe =

Painting by Roy Lichtenstein

- Artist: Roy Lichtenstein
- Year: 1965
- Movement: Pop art
- Dimensions: 152.4 cm × 152.4 cm (60 in × 60 in)
- Location: Museum Ludwig, Cologne, Germany

M-Maybe is a 1965 pop art painting by Roy Lichtenstein. It is one of his romance comics-based works.

== History ==
Lichtenstein's first solo show at The Leo Castelli Gallery in February 1962 sold out before opening. Engagement Ring sold for $1200 and Blam sold for $1000. Prices for his work rose quickly. In 1965, German collector Peter Ludwig asked Castelli, what price Lichtenstein might accept to sell M-Maybe from his personal collection. By then, the going rate for a Lichtenstein was $6000 and Castelli estimated $12,000. Ludwig offered Lichtenstein $30,000 to purchase the work.

== Details ==
M-Maybe depicts a blonde girl, which is typical for Lichtenstein's romance comics adaptations. As is a common theme among these works, she awaits a man in a vague but urban setting. The thought bubble reads "M–Maybe he became ill and couldn’t leave the studio". The text and her expression jointly capture her continuing worry and anticipation. David Britt likens the work to Victorian narrative painting because Lichtenstein invites much speculation with the work, including the identities of the present and absent subjects of the work as well as the "nature of the situation". I.e, what might be holding up his arrival.

Eckhard Schneider describes this single-frame style of art as stills suddenly halting a narrative associated with young women's predicaments, noting that "The private tone of the words increases the paintings’ aura of authenticity, like verbal snap-snots – an aspect especially apparent in the hesitantly voiced ‘M-Maybe’." However, Lichtenstein idealizes the appearance with graphic tension that separates the emotional subject matter from the apparent poise of the depiction.

Lichtenstein had a desire that his paintings look as mechanical as possible although he was a painter. Rather than selecting subject matter from photographs by an individual, he selected teen and action comics, such as the obvious source for this work, as subjects since they were illustrated by teams that produced source material that was devoid of "personal elements of style".

After 1963, Lichtenstein's comics-based women "look hard, crisp, brittle, and uniformly modish in appearance, as if they all came out of the same pot of makeup." This particular example is one of several that is cropped so closely that the girl's hair flows beyond the edges of the canvas. This is an example of Lichtenstein humorously presenting a subject that might be crowded out in a newspaper with a sort of ironic self-awareness that relies on the difference between art and the rest of the world.

== See also ==
- 1965 in art
