= Takka Takka (Lichtenstein) =

Painting by Roy Lichtenstein

- Artist: Roy Lichtenstein
- Year: 1962
- Medium: Acrylic on canvas
- Dimensions: 142.2 cm × 172.7 cm (56 in × 68 in)
- Location: Museum Ludwig; Cologne

Takka Takka is a 1962 pop art painting by Roy Lichtenstein in his comic book style of using Ben-Day dots and a story panel. This work is held in the collection of the Museum Ludwig. The title comes from the onomatopoeic graphics that depict the sound that comes from a machine gun.

== Background ==
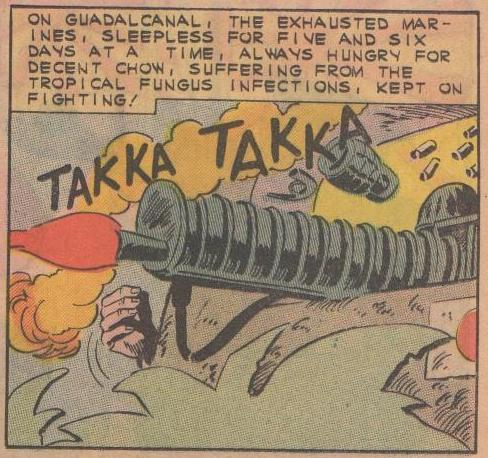
The source of Takka Takka is Battlefield Action #40, February 1962, Charlton Comics Group.

Lichtenstein was a trained United States Army pilot, draftsman and artist as well as a World War II (WWII) veteran who never saw active combat. The work depicts a machine gun firing as it is situated above the camouflage of palm fronds during the Battle of Guadalcanal. The image shows shell casings and a grenade in mid flight. An explosion is stylized with the titular phrase. The source of Takka Takka is the comic book Battlefield Action #40 (February 1962, Charlton Comics Group).

Lichtenstein's reinterpretation of the original comic image eliminates the horizon line and other indications of depth of field. He further eliminates the human element by removing a hand, a helmet and the Japanese rising sun emblem.

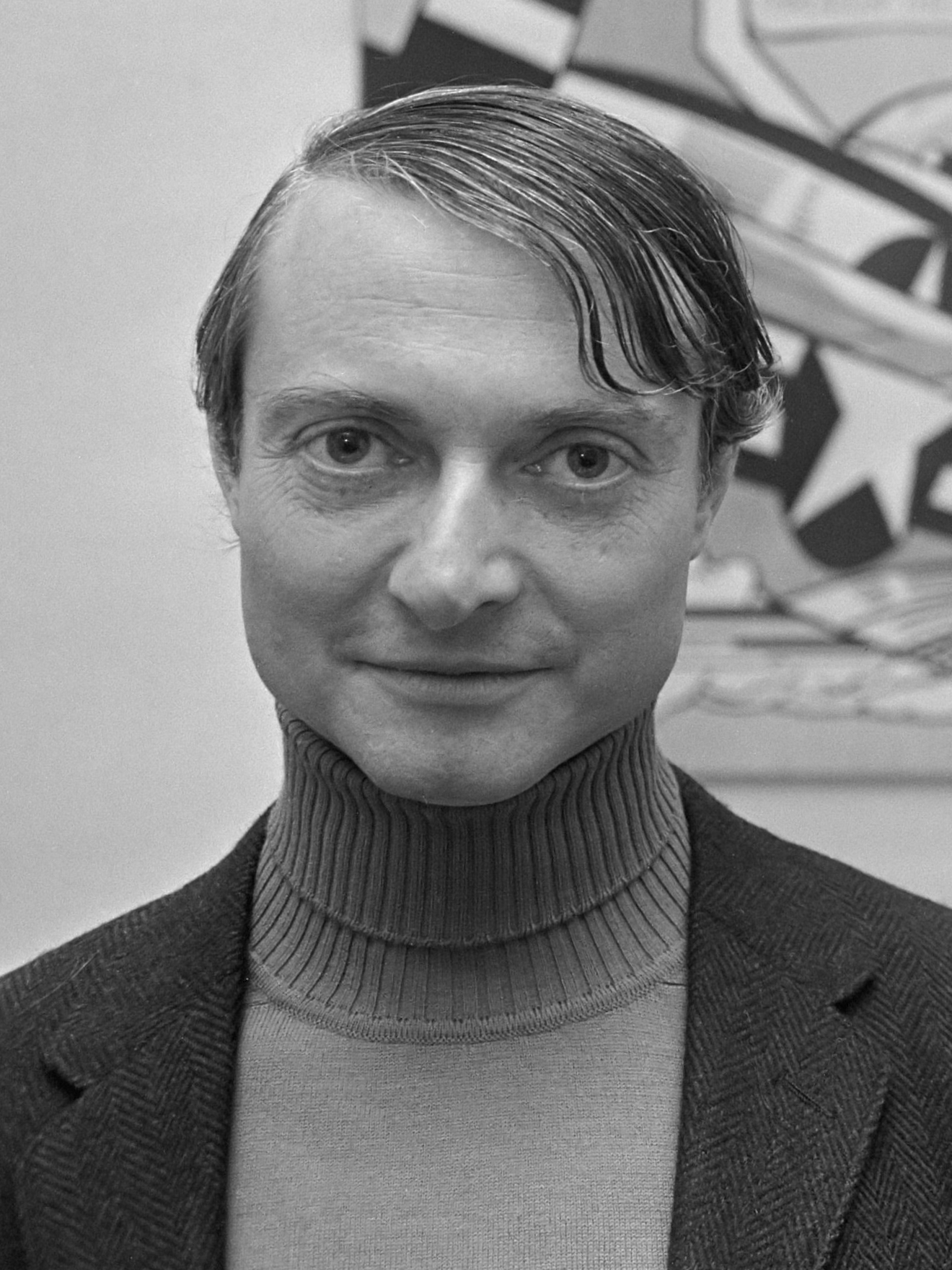
Lichtenstein in 1967

When the characters in some of his works, e.g. Takka Takka, Whaam! and Okay Hot-Shot, Okay!, were criticised for being militaristic, Lichtenstein responded: "the heroes depicted in comic books are fascist types, but I don't take them seriously in these paintings—maybe there is a point in not taking them seriously, a political point. I use them for purely formal reasons."

== Critical response ==
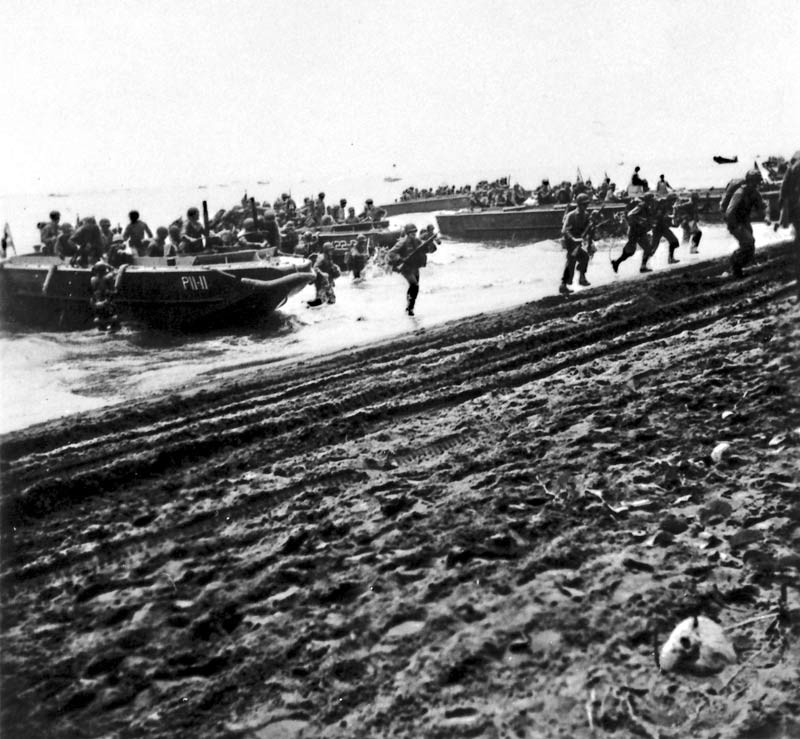
August 7, 1942 Guadalcanal Campaign landings

The Washingtonian critic Sophie Gilbert, regards Takka Takka (along with Bratatat!) as exemplary of Lichtenstein's "aggressive, hyper-masculine war paintings" due to the depiction of the guns creating sound effects and the use of onomatopoeic words during military conflict.

Takka Takka, with its disruption of the primary narrative clause by text focused on absent details about the past or omitted present, is described as "the most unlikely conjunction of picture and story". The work is regarded as one in which Lichtenstein exaggerated comic book sound effects in common pop art style.

In the view of critic Steven Weisenburger, Lichtenstein's reimagining creates a tension between the narrative and graphical content because the "exhausted soldiers" are absent. Takka Takka is a subversion of the interpretive conventions of "pop" culture, "but more important, it interrogates a shared idea about war, that war's sublime violence heroizes." Implicitly comparing Takka Takka to Picasso's Guernica, art historian Klaus Honnef states that the work's use of the "cartoon idiom in combination with elements of written language" demonstrates that art does not have to present the horrors of war graphically in order to be forceful.

== See also ==
- 1962 in art
