= Jet Pilot =

Jet Pilot may refer to:

- Jet pilot, or an aircraft pilot
- Jet Pilot (horse), an American Thoroughbred racehorse
- Jet Pilot (film), a 1957 Cold War action film
- Jet Pilot (Lichtenstein), a 1962 pop art work
- "Jet Pilot", a song by Bob Dylan from the album Biograph
- "Jet Pilot", a song by System of a Down from the album Toxicity
