= Okay Hot-Shot, Okay! =

1963 painting by Roy Lichtenstein

- Artist: Roy Lichtenstein
- Year: 1963
- Movement: Pop art
- Dimensions: 203.2 cm × 172.7 cm (80 in × 68 in)

Okay Hot-Shot, Okay! (sometimes Okay Hot-Shot) is a 1963 pop art painting by Roy Lichtenstein that uses his Ben-Day dots style and a text balloon. It is one of several examples of military art that Lichtenstein created between 1962 and 1964, including several with aeronautical themes like this one. It was inspired by panels from four different comic books that provide the sources for the plane, the pilot, the text balloon and the graphic onomatopoeia, "VOOMP!".

Lichtenstein made several alterations to the source images as he compiled them into this composition. He used themes in this work that relate to those expressed in several of his other works. The narrative content is also said to relate to themes from other works, but instead of Lichtenstein's works it relates to Jackson Pollock's contemporaneous works.

== Background ==
During the late 1950s and early 1960s a number of American painters began to adapt the imagery and motifs of comic strips. Lichtenstein made drawings of comic strip characters in 1958. Andy Warhol produced his earliest paintings using this style in 1960. Lichtenstein, unaware of Warhol's work, produced Look Mickey and Popeye in 1961. Soon, Lichtenstein advanced from animated cartoons to more serious themes such as romance and combat depictions. Lichtenstein said that at the time, "I was very excited about, and very interested in, the highly emotional content yet detached impersonal handling of love, hate, war, etc., in these cartoon images." The work was inspired by five different comic book panels made by Russ Heath and Irv Novick. The plane, the pilot, the text balloon and the graphic onomatopoeia, "VOOMP!", all come from panels from different comic books.

Plane

Text bubble

Pilot

Graphic onomatopoeia

The sources for Okay Hot-Shot, Okay! are All American Men of War #89 (page 8), January–February 1962, National Periodical Publications (DC) (upper left), G.I. Combat #94 (j), June–July 1962, National Periodical Publications (DC) (lower left), All American Men of War #89 (page 2 - Okay, Hot-Shot), January–February 1962, National Periodical Publications (DC) (upper right), All American Men of War #90, March–April 1962, National Periodical Publications (DC) (lower center and right).

Lichtenstein was a trained draftsman and artist. He also received training during World War II as an army pilot, but never saw active combat. His list of aeronautically themed works is extensive, including several others featuring pilots situated in cockpits during air combat such as Jet Pilot (1962), Brattata (1962), and Bratatat! (1963). Some sources list Okay Hot-Shot, Okay! along with Whaam! and Blam as Lichtenstein's best-known examples of military art.

Okay Hot-Shot, Okay! is one of several comics-based works, including Jet Pilot and Von Karp, inspired by the World War II U.S. fighter pilot Johnny Cloud of DC Comics' The Losers. The January–February 1962 DC Comics' All-American Men of War issue #89 was the inspiration for several Lichtenstein paintings, providing two of the source panels of Okay Hot-Shot, Okay! as well as sources for Brattata, Blam, Whaam! and Tex! The graphite pencil sketch, Jet Pilot was also from that issue.

== Critical appraisal ==
In the source, the pilot wore traditional World War II headgear, but Lichtenstein altered the headgear to that of a cosmonaut, astronaut or modern air force pilot of the Cold War era. Lichtenstein also shifted the subject so that his left iris is in the frame. The work also is related to Lichtenstein's theme of "machine and embodied vision" as exhibited in works such as Crak!, Bratatat!, and Jet Pilot.

The narrative content, "Okay, hot-shot, okay! I'm pouring! [ammunition into the enemy]" is said to have a dual meaning that alludes to the style of poured painting being made famous at the time by Pollock. Melodrama through heightened tension ties this with some of Lichtenstein's most notable works.

While melding the elements and motifs of panels from two artists, Lichtenstein simplified the hatching and use of color. In Lichtenstein's obituary, Los Angeles Times critic Christopher Knight said the use of color in this work harkened back to works by Morris Louis and the explosion's graphic elements recalled Kenneth Noland's target work.

In an account published in 1998 after Lichtenstein was famous, Irv Novick said that he met Lichtenstein in the army in 1947 and, as his superior officer, had responded to Lichtenstein's tearful complaints about the menial tasks he was assigned by recommending him for a better job. Jean-Paul Gabilliet has questioned this account, saying that Lichtenstein had left the army a year before the time Novick says the incident took place. Bart Beaty, noting that Lichtenstein had appropriated Novick for works such as Whaam! and Okay Hot-Shot, Okay!, says that Novick's story "seems to be an attempt to personally diminish" the more famous artist.

== See also ==
- 1963 in art
