= Whaam! =

Painting by Roy Lichtenstein

- Artist: Roy Lichtenstein
- Year: 1963
- Medium: Magna acrylic and oil on canvas
- Movement: Pop art
- Dimensions: 172.7 cm × 406.4 cm (68.0 in × 160.0 in)
- Location: Tate Modern, London

Whaam! is a 1963 diptych painting by the American artist Roy Lichtenstein. It is one of the best-known works of pop art, and among Lichtenstein's most important paintings. Whaam! was first exhibited at the Leo Castelli Gallery in New York City in 1963, and purchased by the Tate Gallery, London, in 1966. It has been on permanent display at Tate Modern since 2006.

The left-hand panel shows a fighter plane firing a rocket that, in the right-hand panel, hits a second plane which explodes in flames. Lichtenstein adapted the image from several comic-book panels, with the primary source being a panel illustrated by Irv Novick from a 1962 war comic book. Lichtenstein transformed the source by presenting it as a diptych while altering the relationship of the graphical and narrative elements. Whaam! is regarded for the temporal, spatial and psychological integration of its two panels. The painting's title is integral to the action and impact of the painting, and displayed in large onomatopoeia in the right panel.

Lichtenstein studied as an artist before and after serving in the United States Army during World War II. He practiced anti-aircraft drills during basic training, and he was sent for pilot training but the program was canceled before it started. Among the topics he tackled after the war were romance and war. He depicted aerial combat in several works. Whaam! is part of a series on war that he worked on between 1962 and 1964, and along with As I Opened Fire (1964) is one of his two large war-themed paintings.

== Background ==
In 1943 Lichtenstein left his study of painting and drawing at Ohio State University to serve in the U.S. Army, where he remained until January 1946. After entering training programs for languages, engineering, and piloting, all of which were canceled, he served as an orderly, draftsman and artist in noncombat roles. One of his duties at Camp Shelby was enlarging Bill Mauldin's Stars and Stripes cartoons. He was sent to Europe with an engineer battalion, but did not see active combat. As a painter, he eventually settled on an abstract-expressionist style with parodist elements. Around 1958 he began to incorporate hidden images of cartoon characters such as Mickey Mouse and Bugs Bunny into his abstract works.

A new generation of artists emerged in the late 1950s and early 1960s with a more objective, "cool" approach characterized by the art movements known today as minimalism, hard-edge painting, color field painting, the neo-Dada movement, Fluxus, and pop art, all of which re-defined the avant-garde contemporary art of the time. Pop art and neo-Dada re-introduced and changed the use of imagery by appropriating subject matter from commercial art, consumer goods, art history and mainstream culture. Lichtenstein achieved international recognition during the 1960s as one of the initiators of the pop art movement in America. Regarding his use of imagery MoMA curator Bernice Rose observed that Lichtenstein was interested in "challenging the notion of originality as it prevailed at that time."

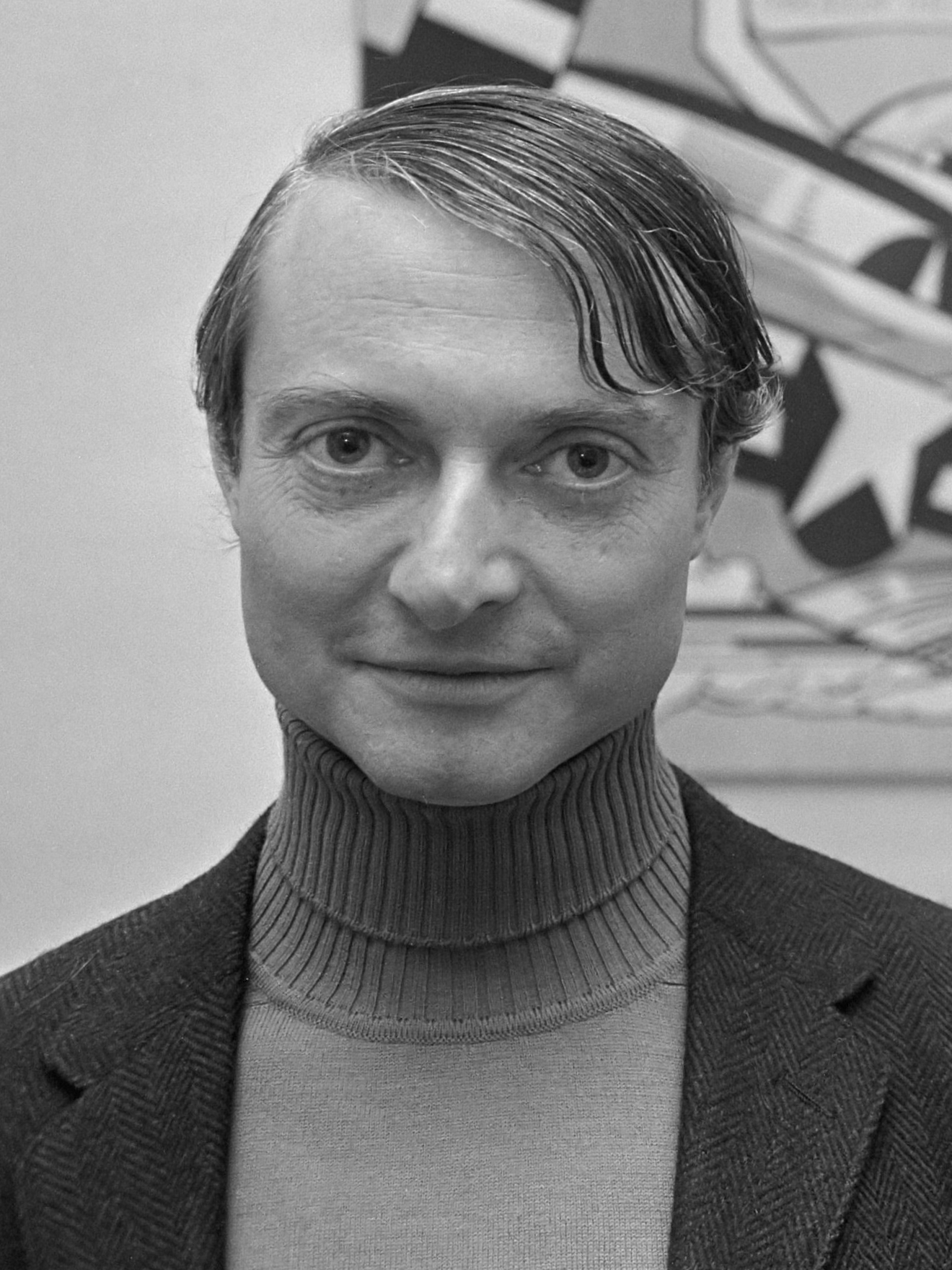
Lichtenstein in 1967

Lichtenstein's early comics-based works such as Look Mickey focused on popular animated characters. By 1963 he had progressed to more serious, dramatic subject matter, typically focusing on romantic situations or war scenes. Comic books as a genre were held in low esteem at the time. Public antipathy led in 1954 to examination of alleged connections between comic books and youth crime during Senate investigations into juvenile delinquency; by the end of that decade, comic books were regarded as material of "the lowest commercial and intellectual kind", according to Mark Thistlethwaite of the Modern Art Museum of Fort Worth. Lichtenstein was not a comic-book enthusiast as a youth, but was enticed as an artist by the challenge of creating art based on a subject remote from the typical "artistic image". Lichtenstein admitted he was "very excited about, and very interested in, the highly emotional content yet detached impersonal handling of love, hate, war, etc., in these cartoon images."

Lichtenstein's romance and war comic-based works took heroic subjects from small source panels and monumentalized them. Whaam! is comparable in size to the generally large canvases painted at that time by the abstract expressionists. It is one of Lichtenstein's many works with an aeronautical theme. He said that "the heroes depicted in comic books are fascist types, but I don't take them seriously in these paintings—maybe there is a point in not taking them seriously, a political point. I use them for purely formal reasons."

== History ==
Whaam! adapts a panel by Irv Novick from the "Star Jockey" story from issue No. 89 of DC Comics' All-American Men of War (February 1962). The original forms part of a dream sequence in which fictional World War II P-51 Mustang pilot Johnny Flying Cloud, "the Navajo ace", foresees himself flying a jet fighter while shooting down other jet planes. In Lichtenstein's painting, both the attacking and target planes are replaced by different types of aircraft. Paul Gravett suggests that Lichtenstein substituted the attacking plane with an aircraft from "Wingmate of Doom" illustrated by Jerry Grandenetti in the subsequent issue (#90, April 1962), and that the target plane was borrowed from a Russ Heath drawing in the third panel of page 3 of the "Aces Wild" story in the same issue No. 89. The painting also omits the speech bubble from the source in which the pilot exclaims "The enemy has become a flaming star!"

Original comic book panel from DC Comics' All-American Men of War No. 89 (February 1962)

A smaller, single-panel oil painting by Lichtenstein around the same time, Tex!, has a similar composition, with a plane at the lower left shooting an air-to-air missile at a second plane that is exploding in the upper right, with a word bubble. The same issue of All-American Men of War was the inspiration for at least three other Lichtenstein paintings, Okay Hot-Shot, Okay!, Brattata and Blam, in addition to Whaam! and Tex! The graphite pencil sketch, Jet Pilot was also from that issue. Several of Lichtenstein's other comics-based works are inspired by stories about Johnny Flying Cloud written by Robert Kanigher and illustrated by Novick, including Okay Hot-Shot, Okay!, Jet Pilot and Von Karp.

Lichtenstein repeatedly depicted aerial combat between the United States and the Soviet Union. In the early and mid-1960s, he produced "explosion" sculptures, taking subjects such as the "catastrophic release of energy" from paintings such as Whaam! and depicting them in freestanding and relief forms. In 1963, he was parodying a variety of artworks, from advertising and comics and to "high art" modern masterpieces by Cézanne, Mondrian, Picasso and others. At the time, Lichtenstein noted that "the things that I have apparently parodied I actually admire".

Lichtenstein's first solo exhibition was held at the Leo Castelli Gallery in New York City, from 10 February to 3 March 1962. It sold out before its opening. The exhibition included Look Mickey, Engagement Ring, Blam and The Refrigerator. According to the Lichtenstein Foundation website, Whaam! was part of Lichtenstein's second solo exhibition at the Leo Castelli Gallery from 28 September to 24 October 1963, that also included Drowning Girl, Baseball Manager, In the Car, Conversation, and Torpedo...Los! Marketing materials for the show included the lithograph artwork, Crak!

The Lichtenstein Foundation website says that Lichtenstein began using his opaque projector technique in 1962. in 1967 he described his process for producing comics-based art as follows:

I do them as directly as possible. If I am working from a cartoon, photograph or whatever, I draw a small picture—the size that will fit into my opaque projector ... I don't draw a picture in order to reproduce it—I do it in order to recompose it ... I go all the way from having my drawing almost like the original to making it up altogether.

Lichtenstein may have substituted this image for the attacking plane from the subsequent issue of DC Comics' All-American Men of War No. 90 (April 1962).

Whaam! was purchased by the Tate Gallery in 1966. In 1969, Lichtenstein donated his initial graphite-on-paper drawing Drawing for 'Whaam!', describing it as a "pencil scribble". According to the Tate, Lichtenstein claimed that this drawing represented his "first visualization of Whaam! and that it was executed just before he started the painting" Although he had conceived of a unified work of art on a single canvas, he made the sketch on two sheets of paper of equal size—measuring 14.9 cm × 30.5 cm (5.9 in × 12.0 in). The painting has been displayed at Tate Modern since 2006. In 2012–13, both works were included in the largest Lichtenstein retrospective yet exhibited, visiting the Art Institute of Chicago (22 May – 3 September 2012), the National Gallery of Art in Washington, D.C. (14 October – 13 January 2013), the Tate Modern in London (21 February – 27 May 2013) and the Centre Pompidou (3 July – 4 November 2013).

== Description ==
Whaam! depicts a fighter aircraft in the left panel firing a rocket into an enemy plane in the right panel, which disintegrates in a vivid red-and-yellow explosion. The cartoon style is emphasized by the use of the onomatopoeic lettering "WHAAM!" in the right panel, and a yellow-boxed caption with black lettering at the top of the left panel. The textual exclamation "WHAAM!" can be considered the graphic equivalent of a sound effect. This was to become a characteristic of his work—like others of his onomatopoeic paintings that contain exclamations such as Bratatat! and Varoom!

Whaam! is one of Lichtenstein's series of war images, typically combining vibrant colors with an expressive narrative. Whaam! is very large, measuring 1.7 m × 4.0 m (5 ft 7 in × 13 ft 4 in). It is less abstract than As I Opened Fire, another of his war scenes. Lichtenstein employs his usual comic-book style: stereotyped imagery in bright primary colors with black outlines, coupled with imitations of mechanical printer's Ben-Day dots. The use of these dots, which were invented by Benjamin Day to simulate color variations and shading, are considered Lichtenstein's "signature method". Whaam! departs from Lichtenstein's earlier diptychs such as Step-on-Can with Leg and Like New, in that the panels are not two variations of the same image.

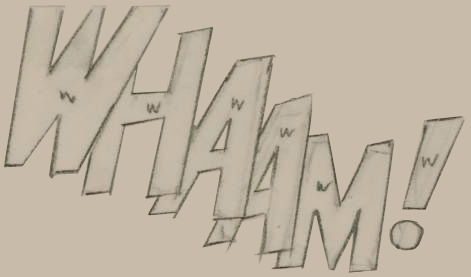
Cropped and edited portion of Drawing for 'Whaam!' (1963). Lichtenstein marked sections with color notations, such as "w" for white.

The planned white letters were yellow in the finished work.

Although Lichtenstein strove to remain faithful to the source images, he constructed his paintings in a traditional manner, starting with a sketch which he adjusted to improve the composition and then projected on to a canvas to make the finished painting. In the case of Whaam!, the sketch is on two pieces of paper, and the finished work is painted with Magna acrylic and oil paint on canvas. Although the transformation from a single-panel conception into a diptych painting occurred during the initial sketch, the final work varies from the sketch in several ways. The sketch suggests that the "WHAAM!" motif would be colored white, although it is yellow in the finished work. Lichtenstein enlarged the main graphical subject of each panel (the plane on the left and the flames on the right), bringing them closer together as a result.

Lichtenstein built up the image with multiple layers of paint. The paint was applied using a scrub brush and handmade metal screen to produce Ben-Day dots via a process that left physical evidence behind. The Ben-Day dots technique enabled Lichtenstein to give his works a mechanically reproduced feel. Lichtenstein said that the work is "supposed to look like a fake, and it achieves that, I think".

Lichtenstein split the composition into two panels to separate the action from its consequence. The left panel features the attacking plane—placed at a diagonal to create a sense of depth—below the text balloon, which Lichtenstein has relegated to the margin above the plane. In the right panel, the exploding plane—depicted head-on—is outlined by the flames, accompanied by the bold exclamation "WHAAM!". Although separate, with one panel containing the missile launch and the other its explosion, representing two distinct events, the two panels are clearly linked spatially and temporally, not least by the horizontal smoke trail of the missile. Lichtenstein commented on this piece in a 10 July 1967, letter: "I remember being concerned with the idea of doing two almost separate paintings having little hint of compositional connection, and each having slightly separate stylistic character. Of course there is the humorous connection of one panel shooting the other."

Lichtenstein altered the composition to make the image more compelling, by making the exploding plane more prominent compared to the attacking plane than in the original. The smoke trail of the missile becomes a horizontal line. The flames of the explosion dominate the right panel, but the pilot and the airplane in the left panel are the narrative focus. They exemplify Lichtenstein's painstaking detailing of physical features such as the aircraft's cockpit. The other element of the narrative content is a text balloon that contains the following text: "I pressed the fire control ... and ahead of me rockets blazed through the sky ..." This is among the text believed to have been written by All-American Men of War editor Robert Kanigher. The yellow word "WHAAM!", altered from the red in the original comic-book panel and white in the pencil sketch, links the yellow of the explosion below it with the textbox to the left and the flames of the missile below the attacking plane.

Lichtenstein's borrowings from comics mimicked their style while adapting their subject matter. He explained that "Signs and comic strips are interesting as subject matter. There are certain things that are usable, forceful and vital about commercial art." Rebecca Bengal at PBS wrote that Whaam!'s graphic clarity exemplifies the ligne claire style associated with Hergé, a cartoonist whose influence Lichtenstein acknowledged. Lichtenstein was attracted to using a cool, formal style to depict emotive subjects, leaving the viewer to interpret the artist's intention. He adopted a simplified color scheme and commercial printing-like techniques. The borrowed technique was "representing tonal variations with patterns of colored circles that imitated the half-tone screens of Ben Day dots used in newspaper printing, and surrounding these with black outlines similar to those used to conceal imperfections in cheap newsprint." Lichtenstein once said of his technique: "I take a cliche and try to organize its forms to make it monumental."

== Reception ==
The painting was, for the most part, well received by art critics when first exhibited. A November 1963 Art Magazine review by Donald Judd described Whaam! as one of the "broad and powerful paintings" of the 1963 exhibition at Castelli's Gallery. In his review of the exhibition, The New York Times art critic Brian O'Doherty described Lichtenstein's technique as "typewriter pointillism ... that laboriously hammers out such moments as a jet shooting down another jet with a big BLAM". According to O'Doherty, the result was "certainly not art, [but] time may make it so", depending on whether it could be "rationalized ... and placed in line for the future to assimilate as history, which it shows every sign of doing." The Tate Gallery in London acquired the work in 1966, leading to heated argument amongst their trustees and some vocal members of the public. The purchase was made from art dealer Ileana Sonnabend, whose asking price of £4,665 (£75,880 in 2025 currency) was reduced by negotiation to £3,940 (£64,087 in 2025 currency). Some Tate trustees opposed the acquisition, among them sculptor Barbara Hepworth, painter Andrew Forge and the poet and critic Herbert Read. Defending the acquisition, art historian Richard Morphet, then an assistant keeper at the Tate, suggested that the painting addresses several issues and painterly styles at the same time: "history painting, Baroque extravagance, and the quotidian phenomenon of mass-circulation comic strips." The Times in 1967 described the acquisition as a "very large and spectacular painting". The Tate's director, Norman Reid, later said that the work aroused more public interest than any of its acquisitions since World War II.

In 1968, Whaam! was included in the Tate's first solo exhibition of Lichtenstein's work. The showing attracted 52,000 visitors, and was organized with the Stedelijk Museum in Amsterdam, which later hosted the exhibition from 4 November to 17 December 1967, before it traveled to three other museums.

== Analysis and interpretation ==
For José Pierre, Whaam! represents Lichtenstein's 1963 expansion "into the 'epic' vein". Keith Roberts, in a 1968 Burlington Magazine article, described the explosion as combining "art nouveau elegance with a nervous energy reminiscent of Abstract Expressionism". Wendy Steiner believes the work is Lichtenstein's most successful and harmonious comic-based composition. She sees the narrative and graphic elements as complementary: the action and spatial alignment lead the viewer's eye from left to right so as to emphasize the relationship between the action and its explosive consequence. The ellipses of the text balloon present a progression which culminates with a "WHAAM!". The "coincidence of pictorial and verbal order" are clear for the Western viewer with the explanatory text beginning in the upper left and action vector moving from the left foreground to the right background, culminating in a graphical explosion in tandem with a narrative exclamation. Steiner says the striking incongruity of the two panels—the left panel appearing to be "truncated", while the right depicts a centralized explosion—enhances the work's narrative power.

Graphite-pencil-on-paper drawing entitled Drawing for 'Whaam!' (1963), 14.9 cm × 30.5 cm (5.9 in × 12.0 in), was donated to the Tate in 1969. It shows the original plan was a single unified work.

Lichtenstein's technique has been characterized by Ernst A. Busche as "the enlargement and unification of his source material ... on the basis of strict artistic principles". Extracted from a larger narrative, the resulting stylized image became in some cases a "virtual abstraction". By recreating their minimalistic graphic techniques, Lichtenstein reinforced the artificial nature of comic strips and advertisements. Lichtenstein's magnification of his source material made his impersonally drawn motifs seem all the more empty. Busche also says that although a critique of modern industrial America may be read into these images, Lichtenstein "would appear to accept the environment as revealed by his reference material as part of American capitalist industrial culture".

David McCarthy contrasted Lichtenstein's "dispassionate, detached and oddly disembodied" presentation of aerial combat with the work of H.C. Westermann, for whom the experience of military service in World War II instilled a need to horrify and shock. In contrast, Lichtenstein registers his "comment on American civilization" by scaling up inches-high comic book images to the oversized dimensions of history painting. Laura Brandon saw an attempt to convey "the trivialization of culture endemic in contemporary American life" by depicting a shocking scene of combat as a banal Cold War act.

Carol Strickland and John Boswell say that by magnifying the comic book panels to an enormous size with dots, "Lichtenstein slapped the viewer in the face with their triviality." H. H. Arnason noted that Whaam! presents "limited, flat colors and hard, precise drawing", which produce "a hard-edge subject painting that documents while it gently parodies the familiar hero images of modern America". The flat and highly finished style of planned brushstrokes can be seen as pop art's reaction against the looseness of abstract expressionism. Alastair Sooke says that the work can be interpreted as a symbolic self-portrait in which the pilot in the left panel represents Lichtenstein "vanquishing his competitors in a dramatic art-world dogfight" by firing a missile at the colorful "parody of abstract painting" in the right panel.

According to Ernesto Priego, while the work adapts a comic-book source, the painting is neither a comic nor a comics panel, and "its meaning is solely referential and post hoc". It directs the attention of its audience to features such as genre and printing methods. Visually and narratively, the original panel was the climactic element of a dynamic page composition. Lichtenstein emphasizes the onomatopoeia while playing down articulated speech by removing the speech balloon. According to Priego, "by stripping the comics panel from its narrative context, Whaam! is representative in the realm of fine art of the preference of the image-icon over image-narrative".

Whaam! is sometimes said to belong to the same anti-war genre as Picasso's Guernica, a suggestion dismissed by Bradford R. Collins. Instead, Collins views the painting as a revenge fantasy against Lichtenstein's first wife Isabel, conceived as it was during their bitter divorce battle (the couple separated in 1961 and divorced in 1965).

== Legacy ==
Marla F. Prather observed that Whaam!'s grand scale and dramatic depiction contributed to its position as a historic work of pop art. With As I Opened Fire, Lichtenstein's other monumental war painting, Whaam! is regarded as the culmination of Lichtenstein's dramatic war-comics works, according to Diane Waldman. It is widely described as either Lichtenstein's most famous work, or, along with Drowning Girl, as one of his two most famous works. Andrew Edgar and Peter Sedgwick describe it, along with Warhol's Marilyn Monroe prints, as one of the most famous works of pop art. Gianni Versace once linked the two iconic pop art images via his gown designs. According to Douglas Coupland, the World Book Encyclopedia used pictures of Warhol's Monroes and Whaam! to illustrate its Pop art entry.

Dave Gibbons created an alternate version of the Novick original parodying Lichtenstein's work.

Comic books were in turn affected by the cultural impact of pop art. By the mid-1960s, some comic books were displaying a new emphasis on garish colors, emphatic sound effects and stilted dialogue—the elements of comic book style that had come to be regarded as camp—in an attempt to appeal to older, college-age readers who appreciated pop art. Gravett observed that the "simplicity and outdatedness [of comic books] were ripe for being mocked".

Whaam! was one of the key works exhibited in a major Lichtenstein retrospective in 2012–2013 that was designed, according to Li-mei Hoang, to demonstrate "the importance of Lichtenstein's influence, his engagement with art history and his enduring legacy as an artist". In his review of the Lichtenstein Retrospective at the Tate Modern, Adrian Searle of The Guardian—who was generally unenthusiastic about Lichtenstein's work—credited the work's title with accurately describing its graphic content: "Whaam! goes the painting, as the rocket hits, and the enemy fighter explodes in a livid, comic-book roar." Daily Telegraph critic Alastair Smart wrote a disparaging review in which he acknowledged Lichtenstein's reputation as a leading figure in "Pop Art's cheeky assault on the swaggering, self-important Abstract Expressionists", whose works Smart said Whaam! mimicked by its huge scale. Smart said the work was neither a positive commentary on the fighting American spirit nor a critique, but was notable for marking "Lichtenstein's incendiary impact on the US art scene".

Detractors have raised concerns over Lichtenstein's appropriation, in that he directly references imagery from other sources in Whaam! and other works of the period. Some have denigrated it as mere copying, to which others have countered that Lichtenstein altered his sources in significant, creative ways. In response to claims of plagiarism, the Roy Lichtenstein Foundation has noted that publishers have never sued for copyright infringement, and that they never raised the issue when Lichtenstein's comics-derived work first gained attention in the 1960s. Other criticism centers on Lichtenstein's failure to credit the original artists of his sources; Ernesto Priego implicates National Periodicals in the case of Whaam!, as the artists were never credited in the original comic books.

In Alastair Sooke's 2013 BBC Four documentary that took place in front of Whaam! at the Tate Modern, British comic book artist Dave Gibbons disputed Sooke's assertion that Lichtenstein's painting improved upon Novick's panel, saying: "This to me looks flat and abstracted, to the point of view that to my eyes it's confusing. Whereas the original has got a three-dimensional quality to it, it's got a spontaneity to it, it's got an excitement to it, and a way of involving the viewer that this one lacks." Gibbons has parodied Lichtenstein's derivation of the Novick work.

== See also ==
- 1963 in art
