= 1963 in art =

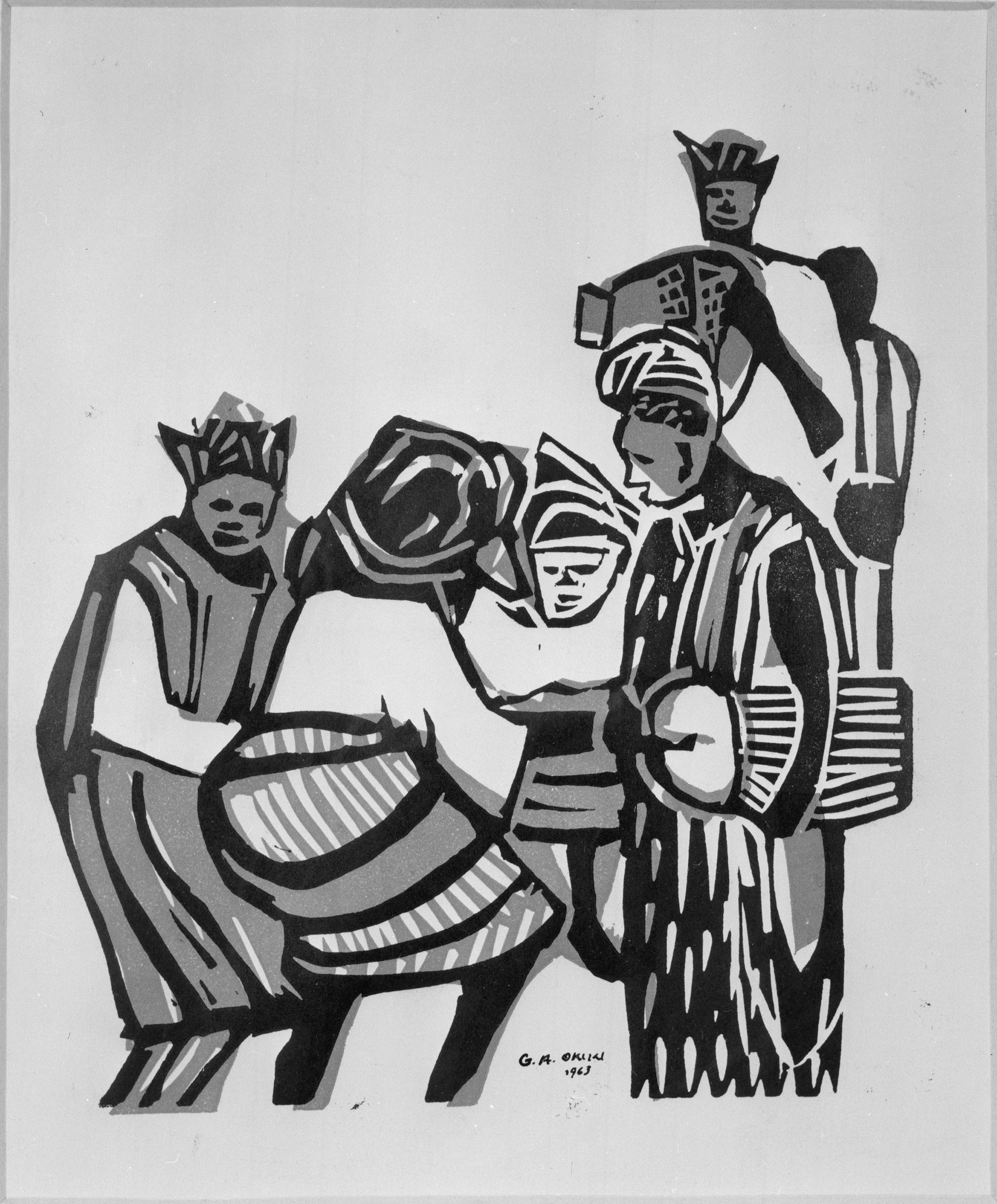

Events from the year 1963 in art.

== Events ==
- January 8 – Leonardo da Vinci's Mona Lisa is exhibited in the United States for the first (and only) time, for a period of four weeks, at the National Gallery of Art in Washington, D.C. During this time it was viewed by over half a million people.
- September – The David Mirvish Gallery is opened in Toronto by David Mirvish.
- November 17 – Museo Bodoniano opens in Parma, Italy.
- Museum of Contemporary Art (Skopje) opens in Yugoslavia.
- First Pirelli Calendar (for 1964), photographed by Robert Freeman in Mallorca, issued in the United Kingdom. His portrait of The Beatles is used on the cover of their album With the Beatles (released November 22).

== Awards ==
- Archibald Prize: J Carington Smith – Professor James McAuley
- John Moores Painting Prize – Roger Hilton for "March 1963"

== Exhibitions ==
- Visione e Colore, Palazzo Grassi, Venice
- Roy Lichtenstein's second solo exhibition, Leo Castelli Gallery, New York City
- Morris Louis memorial exhibition, Guggenheim Museum, New York City
- December 16 unti January 5, 1964 - Sven Lukin at Pace Gallery in Boston, Massachusetts

== Works ==
- Josef Albers – "Manhattan" for the Pan Am Building in New York City (disassembled and removed in 2000 - recreated from Albers' design specifications in 2019 after the original was determined to be unsalvageable due to asbestos)
- Liberty Bell (Portland, Oregon)
- Georg Baselitz – Die große Nacht im Eimer (Museum Ludwig, Cologne)
- Romare Bearden – Prevalence of Ritual
- Maurice Boitel – Cadaques
- Stuart Davis - Contranuities
- Donald De Lue = Rocket Thrower (bronze sculpture created for the 1964 World's Fair in and then permanently installed in Flushing Meadows Corona Park in Queens, New York)
- Melvin Edwards - Lynch Fragments (sculpture series)
- M. C. Escher – Möbius Strip II (Red Ants) (woodcut)
- David Hockney – Domestic Scene, Los Angeles
- Edward Hopper – Two Comedians
- Roy Lichtenstein
  - Bratatat!
  - Crying Girl (lithograph)
  - Drowning Girl
  - Hopeless
  - In the Car
  - Okay Hot-Shot, Okay!
  - Torpedo...Los!
  - Varoom!
  - Whaam! (diptych)
  - Woman with Flowered Hat
- René Magritte – The Difficult Crossing (2nd version)
- Lewis Morley – Christine Keeler (photograph)
- John Piper and Patrick Reyntiens – windows at St Andrew's Church, Plymouth
- Andy Warhol
  - Death in America (screenprint series)
  - Eight Elvises
  - Green Car Crash (Green Burning Car I)
  - Orange Disaster #5
  - Red Car Crash
  - Silver Car Crash (Double Disaster)
  - Suicide (Purple Jumping Man)
  - Thirty Are Better Than One
  - White Disaster (White Car Crash 19 Times)
- David Wynne
  - Christ and Mary Magdalene (bronze castings, Ely Cathedral and Magdalen College, Oxford)
  - Fire Figure (partly gilded aluminium, Lewis's, Hanley, Staffordshire)
  - Reclining Woman (bronzes)
  - The Sisters (bronzes)
  - Sleeping girl (bronzes)
  - Yehudi Menuhin (bronze heads)

== Births ==
- January 20 – Mark Ryden, American painter
- April 4 – Martin Firrell, French-born British public artist
- April 20 – Dame Rachel Whiteread, English sculptor
- May 16 – Jon Coffelt, American painter, sculptor and book artist
- May 31 – Wesley Willis, American artist and musician (d. 2003)
- June 24 – Mike Wieringo, American comic book artist (d. 2007)
- July 20 – Ciruelo Cabral, Argentine fantasy artist
- August 16 – Stevenson Magloire, painter of the School of Saint Soleil (d. 1994)
- August 21 – Hanoch Piven, Uruguayan-born Israeli mixed media artist and caricaturist
- October 6 – Romero Britto, Brazilian artist
- date unknown
  - Marco Evaristti, Chilean sculptor
  - Anya Gallaccio, British installation artist
  - Sophie Ryder, English sculptor
  - Bob and Roberta Smith (Patrick Brill), English slogan painter

== Deaths ==
- February 3 – Piero Manzoni, Italian artist (b. 1933)
- February 8 – Fortunino Matania, Italian-born illustrator and war artist (b. 1881)
- February 14 – Hilda Vīka, Latvian painter (born 1897)
- February 27 – Vladimir Konashevich, Russian graphic artist (b. 1888).
- March 1 – Felice Casorati, Italian painter (b. 1883)
- June 9 – Jacques Villon, French Cubist painter and printmaker (b. 1875)
- June 20 – Manuel Benedito, Spanish painter (b. 1875)
- July 16 – Antonio Donghi, Italian painter (b. 1897)
- July 23 – Aleksandr Gerasimov, Soviet socialist realist painter (b. 1881)
- August 11 – Alois Arnegger, Austrian painter (b. 1879)
- August 16 – Joan Eardley, British painter (b. 1921)
- August 31 – Georges Braque, French painter and sculptor (b. 1882)
- September 11 – Suzanne Duchamp, French Dadaist painter and sister of Marcel Duchamp (b. 1889)
- September 19 – David Low, New Zealand-born editorial cartoonist (b. 1891)
- October 20 – Everett Warner, American impressionist painter and printmaker (b. 1877)

== See also ==
- 1963 in fine arts of the Soviet Union
