= Death and Disaster =

Set of silkscreen serigraphs by Andy Warhol

Death and Disaster is a series of paintings created by American artist Andy Warhol between 1962 and 1967. Using silkscreened photographs appropriated from newspapers and wire services, the series depicts subjects including automobile accidents, suicides, race riots, electric chairs, and gangsters. It is widely regarded as one of Warhol's most significant bodies of work and marked a decisive shift from his early Pop paintings of consumer products and celebrities toward imagery of violence, mortality, and mass media.

== Background ==
Pop artist Andy Warhol began the Death and Disaster series in 1962, shortly after completing his first paintings of movie stars, Campbell's soup cans, and dollar bills. The impetus for the series was sparked over a discussion between Warhol and art curator Henry Geldzahler. Warhol later recalled in his memoir POPism: The Warhol '60s (1980):

"It was Henry Geldzahler who gave me the idea to start the Death and Disaster series. We were having lunch one day at Serendipity on East Sixtieth Street, and he laid the Daily News out on the table. The headline was '129 Die in Jet.' And that's what started me on the death series—the car crashes, the disasters, the electric chairs....
(Whenever I look back at that front page, I'm struck by the date—June 4, 1962. Six years to the date later, my own disaster was the front page headline, "ARTIST SHOT.")

The series coincided with a period when television, newspapers, and photojournalism brought graphic images of tragedy into American homes with unprecedented frequency. Rather than inventing his own imagery, Warhol appropriated photographs already circulating in the mass media, enlarging and reproducing them through the commercial silkscreen process he had recently adopted.

To locate source material, Warhol searched newspaper archives, police photographs, and Associated Press wire images. The resulting paintings juxtaposed scenes of violent death with brightly colored backgrounds and mechanically repeated compositions, emphasizing both the ubiquity and emotional desensitization produced by media repetition.

== Description ==
The Death and Disaster series encompasses numerous groups of paintings produced between 1962 and 1967. Subjects include fatal automobile collisions, suicides, electric chairs, race riots, wanted criminals, and gangland funerals.

Warhol frequently repeated a single photograph multiple times across a canvas, allowing imperfections in the silkscreen process to create fading, misregistration, and uneven inking. Some works feature monochromatic palettes, while others pair graphic black-and-white photographs with vivid fields of red, orange, pink, turquoise, or silver.

Among the best-known works are 129 Die in Jet! (1962), Orange Car Crash Fourteen Times (1963), Silver Car Crash (Double Disaster) (1963), White Burning Car III (1963), Race Riot (1964), Tunafish Disaster (1963), and Big Electric Chair (1967).

Following the assassination of President John F. Kennedy on November 22, 1963, Warhol also created Jackie (The Week That Was), a sequence of images of Jacqueline Kennedy before and after the assassination. Although often discussed alongside the Death and Disaster paintings, the Jackie works have also been treated as a distinct series.

== Interpretation ==
The series examines the relationship between violence, media, and repetition in postwar American culture. By reproducing press photographs without editorial commentary, Warhol presented tragedy as another consumable image circulating through newspapers and television. Repetition became one of the defining aspects of the series, with Warhol suggesting that repeated exposure diminished emotional response. "When you see a gruesome picture over and over again, it doesn't really have any effect," he remarked.

Art critic Gene Swenson noted that "Warhol's repetitions of car crashes, suicides and electric chairs are not like the repetition of similar and yet different terrible scenes day in and day out in the tabloids. These paintings mute what is present in the single front page each day, and emphasize what is present persistently day after day in slightly different variations. Looking at the papers, we do not consciously make the connection between today's, yesterday's, and tomorrow's repetitions which are not repetitions."

"These Disaster paintings are not Andy reveling in disaster: This is Andy sitting at the eye of the storm, being the one still person among disasters, death and horror," said art historian Sir John Richardson.

Art historian Jonathan Flatley argues that the Death and Disaster series transforms images of violence—such as car crashes, suicides, electric chairs, racial violence, and nuclear explosions—into objects of aesthetic engagement. By reproducing press photographs through silkscreen and placing them against vivid colors, Warhol removed them from the desensitizing cycle of mass-media consumption. Flatley cites Warhol collaborator Gerard Malanga, who observed, "If you see a UPI photo, you're going to grimace; but if you see it on a canvas with color, you might accept it." Flatley suggests that Warhol's approach allowed viewers to confront disturbing images differently, transforming immediate shock into contemplation.

== Legacy ==
The Death and Disaster paintings have become central to scholarship on Warhol's career. They expanded the possibilities of Pop beyond commercial imagery by demonstrating that the same methods used to depict consumer goods could also address mortality, political violence, and collective trauma.

Several works from the series rank among Warhol's most valuable paintings. In November 2013, Silver Car Crash (Double Disaster) sold for $105 million at Sotheby's, making it the highest price paid for a Warhol serograph at that time. Previously, another work from the series Green Car Crash (1963), which sold for $71.7 million at auction in 2007, held this record.
