= Green Car Crash =

1963 painting by Andy Warhol

Green Car Crash (Green Burning Car I)
- Artist: Andy Warhol
- Year: 1963
- Medium: synthetic polymer, silkscreen ink and acrylic on linen
- Dimensions: 228.6 cm × 203.2 cm (90.0 in × 80.0 in)
- Location: Private collection

Green Car Crash (Green Burning Car I) is a 1963 serigraph painting by the American artist Andy Warhol, On May 16, 2007 at 7 P.M, it sold for $71.7m (£42.3m) at auction. It is held now in a private collection.

== History ==
Green Car Crash (Green Burning Car I) is one of the representative paintings of Pop Culture. It is part of the Death and Disaster series painted by Andy Warhol in 1963. Although attributed to Warhol himself, it is assumed that his assistant Gerard Malanga made a large contribution to this creation.. Completed in 1963, it was inspired by photographs taken by John Whitehead and published in Newsweek magazine. The car was pursued by the Seattle police before the driver lost control of the wheel at 60 miles per hour (97 km/h)and crashed into a utility pole. Green Car Crash (Green Burning Car I) is not the only Warhol Burning Car painting of five (all based on Whitehead's photograph) to utilize a color other than black and white. Orange Car Crash (5 Deaths 11 Times in Orange) and Orange Car Crash Fourteen Times follow suit.

== Auctions and market value ==
Green Car Crash was privately owned for more than 30 years, and when it was put up for sale in 2007, it generated a large amount of interest. By that time, it set a new record for an Andy Warhol creation, being sold for $71.7 million US, while the pre-auction estimate was $25 million US.

This record was broken in 2013, when another painting of the collection, the Silver Car Crash (Double Disaster) was sold for $105.4 million US.
