= Bratatat! =

Painting by Roy Lichtenstein

- Artist: Roy Lichtenstein
- Year: 1963
- Movement: Pop art
- Dimensions: 116.8 cm × 86.4 cm (46 in × 34 in)

Bratatat! is a 1963 pop art painting done in oil and graphite on canvas by Roy Lichtenstein in his comic book style of using Ben-Day dots and a text balloon.

== Background ==
The source of Bratatat! is All-American Men of War #90 © March–April 1962, National Periodical Publications (DC).

Lichtenstein was a trained United States Army pilot, draftsman and artist as well as a World War II veteran who never saw active combat. His list of aeronautical themed works is extensive. Within that genre, Lichtenstein has produced several works featuring pilots situated in cockpits during air combat such as Jet Pilot (1962), Brattata (1962) and Okay Hot-Shot, Okay! (1963). Bratatat!, along with Whaam! and Varoom! are among Lichtenstein's most recognizable onomatopoeic works.

The source of Bratatat! is All-American Men of War #90 (March–April 1962, DC Comics). Bratatat! depicts a jet fighter pilot engaged in military conflict. The black and white sketch of this work has been on a worldwide tour, accompanied by DC Comics artwork.

The painting is symbolic of Lichtenstein's portfolio of work and is widely celebrated, as much for the name as for the actual graphical content of military conflict, in the marketing of the artist and his works.

== Critical response ==
The work addresses Lichtenstein's motif of monocularity by pitting the pilot's binocular vision against the technologically advanced monocular computing reflector gun sight. The Washingtonian's critic Sophie Gilbert regards Bratatat! (along with Takka Takka) as exemplary of Lichtenstein's "aggressive, hyper-masculine war paintings" because of its depiction of the guns creating sound effects and the use of onomatopoeic words during military conflict. Dramatic close-ups of male protagonists at war, such as Bratatat! and Torpedo...Los!, serve as counterpoints to Lichtenstein's women in clichéd romantic turmoil during highly-charged moments. The work also is related to Lichtenstein's theme of "machine and embodied vision" as exhibited in works such as Crak!, Okay Hot-Shot, Okay!, and Jet Pilot.

== See also ==
- 1963 in art
