= Varoom! =

Painting by Roy Lichtenstein

- Artist: Roy Lichtenstein
- Year: 1963
- Movement: Pop art
- Dimensions: 142.2 cm × 142.2 cm (56 in × 56 in)
- Location: The John and Kimiko Powers Collection

Varoom! is a 1963 pop art painting by Roy Lichtenstein that depicts an explosion and the onomatopoeic sound that gives it its name.

== Background ==
Varoom, 1965

In the early- and mid-1960s Lichtenstein produced several of his most notable works, many with themes of war or romance, but others with themes of explosions or brushstrokes. Several of Lichtenstein's large-scale depictions of explosions, such as Varoom! are iconic. Varoom! along with Whaam! and Bratatat! are among Lichtenstein's most recognizable onomatopoeic works and was in a sense part of Lichtenstein's response to action painting.

Lichtenstein's list of aeronautically themed works is extensive. Varoom! is an explosion that is regarded as part of that theme. Varoom!, which depicts an instantaneous explosion, is composed of the primary colors presented over a light dotted background. Black and white specs add crackle to the composition. The block-lettered text, "VAROOM!", stands out, giving a title to the shattering event.

In 1964, this painting served as the basis for the beginning of Lichtenstein's sculptural efforts, when he produced an enameled steel work that extended his theme of flatness. In 1965, he extended this theme to ceramic art.

Lichtenstein also created another painting entitled Varoom (no exclamation point, 1965).

== Critical appraisal ==
Varoom!, which spews action and drama, is based on the "visual language of comics", unlike the romance and war comic-based work that focuses more on the narrative than the graphic details as this work does.

== See also ==
- 1963 in art
