= As I Opened Fire =

Painting by Roy Lichtenstein

- Artist: Roy Lichtenstein
- Year: 1964
- Movement: Pop art
- Dimensions: 170 cm × 430 cm (68 in × 168 in)
- Location: Stedelijk Museum; Amsterdam

As I Opened Fire (sometimes As I Opened Fire...) is a 1964 oil and magna on canvas painting by Roy Lichtenstein. The work is hosted at the Stedelijk Museum in Amsterdam. The source of the subject matter is Jerry Grandenetti's panels from "Wingmate of Doom," in All American Men of War, no. 90 (March–April 1962), DC Comics.

== Detail ==
The source for As I Opened Fire was All American Men of War #90 (b) (March–April 1962).

Measuring 170 cm × 430 cm (68 in × 168 in), As I Opened Fire is a triptych with verbal and temporal continuity. In 1972, it was regarded as "...perhaps Lichtenstein's most ambitious exercise in strangely uniting, visually (as well as figuratively) warring elements." Depicting a short few seconds during an aircraft battle, the painting is based on three panels of the original narrative which Lichtenstein has altered to improve its formal coherence. This piece represents his affinity toward the high school "...highly emotional content, yet detached impersonal handling..." As I Opened Fire exhibits Lichtenstein's "formal imagination". We see successive tighter views of the gun muzzles in action accompanied by an onomatopoeia, which provides cinematic flow despite the varying skies. As I Opened Fire is regarded as a "very uncompromising military triptych".

Lichtenstein desired his paintings to look as mechanical as possible despite being painted by hand. He chose as his subjects teen and action comics because he valued the impersonal quality of their artwork, the products of teams of illustrators. The similarities to the original source are extensive: narrative text and general message of the gunfire. However, he made the joint image more coherent by repositioning the second and third panels for better alignment.

Along with Whaam! (the other of his monumental war paintings), this is regarded as the culmination of the dramatic war-comic works of Lichtenstein. Compared with Whaam!, As I Opened Fire is more abstract. Lichtenstein commented on his war imagery:

A minor purpose of my war paintings is to put military aggressiveness in an absurd light. My personal opinion is that much of our foreign policy has been unbelievably terrifying, but this is not what my work is about and I don't want to capitalize on this popular position. My work is more about our American definition of images and visual communication.

Lichtenstein's alterations from the original source change the uniform perspective of the images, causing it to flow "like a series of movie clips".

The work is considered relatively lacking in unity of its narrative progression. The narrative of the first frame seems unrelated to its graphics and the other frames are equally confusing: It is not clear which frames represent an enemy or an ally, or whether the speaker is the enemy, an ally or the viewer. In general the work is misleading in "spatial, temporal and psychological viewpoint".

== See also ==
- 1964 in art
