= Brattata =

Painting by Roy Lichtenstein

- Artist: Roy Lichtenstein
- Year: 1962
- Movement: Pop art
- Dimensions: 106.7 cm × 106.7 cm (42 in × 42 in)
- Location: Tehran Museum of Contemporary Art

Brattata is a 1962 pop art oil and graphite painting on canvas by Roy Lichtenstein in his comic book style of using Ben-Day dots and a text balloon. The work is held in the collection at the Tehran Museum of Contemporary Art. It is one of several Lichtenstein works from All-American Men of War issue #89, but is a reworking of its source panel.

== Background ==
The source of Brattata is All-American Men of War #89 (j), January–February 1962, National Periodical Publications Inc. (DC).

According to the University of Michigan Library, at one time the work was held in the Fischmann collection. St. Louis businessman and financier, Milton Fischmann died in May 1974, and the work is now in the collection of the Tehran Museum of Contemporary Art. A trained draftsman and artist, Lichtenstein was a United States Army pilot who served in World War II without ever seeing active combat. His list of aeronautical-themed works is extensive. Within that genre, Lichtenstein has featured pilots situated in cockpits during air combat in many of his works, such as Jet Pilot (1962), Bratatat! (1963), and Okay Hot-Shot, Okay! (1963). The source of Brattata is All-American Men of War #89 (January–February 1962, DC Comics). The same issue was the inspiration for several other Lichtenstein paintings, Okay Hot-Shot, Okay!, Blam, Whaam! and Tex! The graphite pencil sketch, Jet Pilot, was also from that issue. The pilot's mask is unbuckled, revealing the lower half of his face (as opposed to Bratatat! and Jet Pilot where only the eyes are visible). The onomatopoeia presented graphically appears as a cliché. In comparison to the original Lichtenstein increased the required number of downed planes for flying ace recognition by two, possibly reflecting his own training.

== Critical appraisal ==
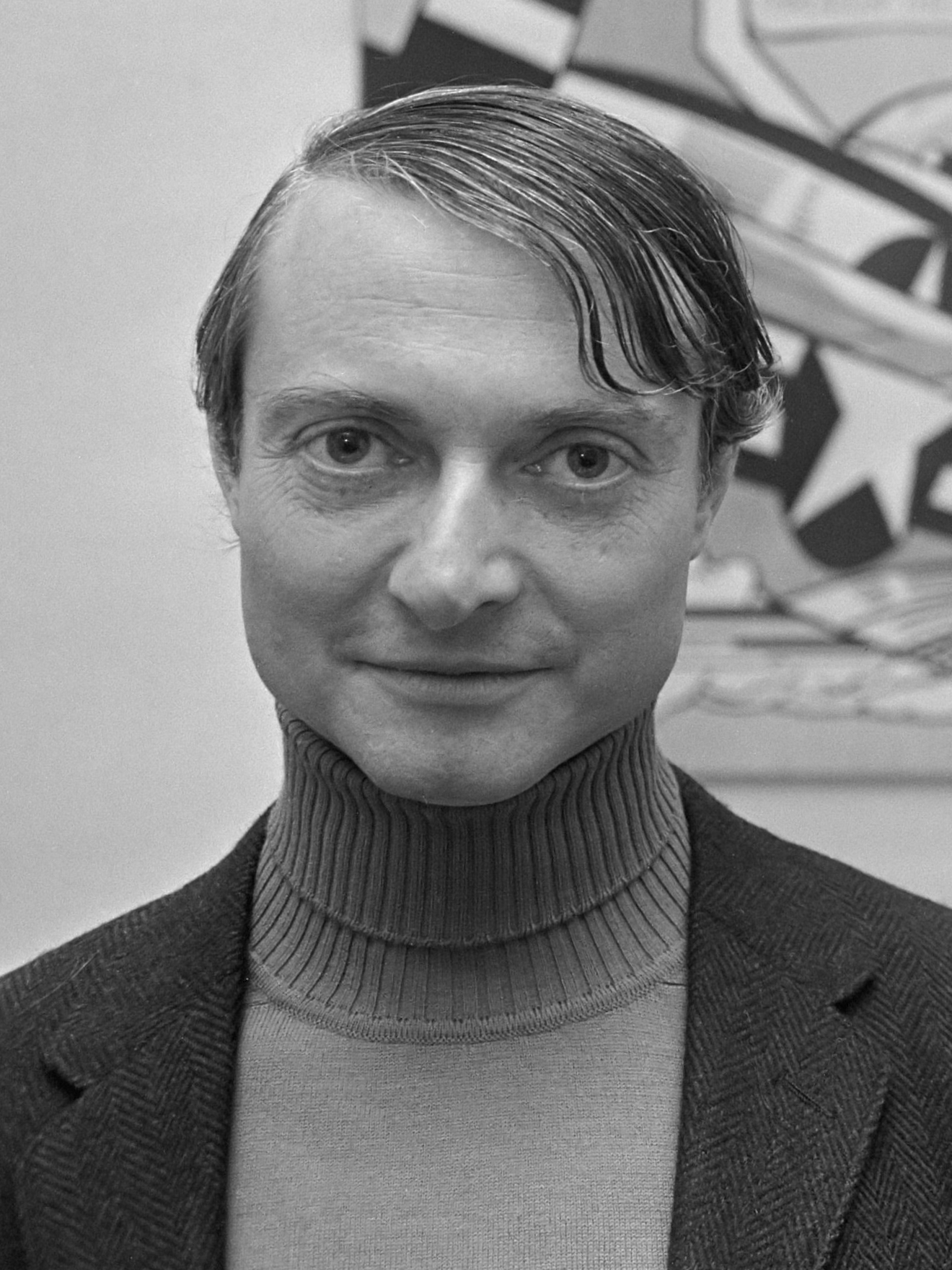
Lichtenstein in 1967

The work is among those known for "bursting shapes and colors" in its graphical content and excellent sound and action in its narrative content. It is one of several Lichtenstein works that depicts what one author describes as a "male violence fantasy".

Original artwork artist Russ Heath had accurately depicted the downward slanting gun sight and angled cockpit control panel. Lichtenstein depicted these without any slant, making them parallel to the surface of the canvas, which in a sense makes the viewer feel as if he is taking the place of the pilot.

== See also ==
- 1962 in art
