= Blam (Lichtenstein) =

Painting by Roy Lichtenstein

- Artist: Roy Lichtenstein
- Year: 1962
- Movement: Pop art
- Dimensions: 172.7 cm × 203.2 cm (68 in × 80 in)
- Location: Yale University Art Gallery

Blam (sometimes Blam!) is a 1962 oil painting on canvas created by Roy Lichtenstein and falling within the pop art idiom. It is one of his military comic book derivatives and was one of the works presented at his first solo exhibition. The work is in the collection at the Yale University Art Gallery.

== History ==
The source for Blam was All American Men of War #89 (January–February 1962)

The painting is based on Russ Heath's art in the comic book All-American Men of War issue #89 (January-February 1962), published by National Periodical Publications. The painting depicts a pilot ejecting from an exploding plane. The same issue was the inspiration for several other Lichtenstein paintings, Okay Hot-Shot, Okay!, Brattata, Whaam! and Tex! The graphite pencil sketch, Jet Pilot was also from that issue.

When Lichtenstein had his first solo show at The Leo Castelli Gallery in February 1962, it sold out before opening. Blam sold for $1000 ($10,644 in 2025 dollars), according to one source, but less than $1000 according to another. The exhibition included Look Mickey, Engagement Ring and The Refrigerator. The show ran from February 10 through March 3. The work appeared in the exhibition entitled 'The New Realists' at the Sidney Janis Gallery from November 1 to December 1, 1962.

== Details ==
Lichtenstein began his war imagery efforts with single frame pictures such as BLAM. Blam uses quintessential war imagery. Although the text is limited to one four-letter word, the narrative is unnecessary owing to the eminent realism presented. The canvas is loaded with images surrounding the focal figure, of the aircraft under attack. It is regarded, along with Takka Takka as "successful in their combination of brilliant color and narrative situation". Blam is a jest with the viewer that uses an exclamation without narrative context. Like Blang (1962) and Varoom (1963), Blam's onomatopoeia explodes "like a violent central sun over the entire composition". Lichtenstein has revised the original source so that the aircraft and its explosion are the joint foci from which the painting radiates. Unlike the original, which had substantive narrative content, Lichtenstein's version has more formality and a linear pattern, but a more simplified surface.

== See also ==
- 1962 in art
