= Irv Novick =

American comics artist

- Novick at his drawing board
- Born: Irving Novick; April 11, 1916 New York City, U.S.
- Died: October 15, 2004 (aged 88) Dobbs Ferry, New York, U.S.
- Area: Penciller
- Notable works: All-American Men of War; Batman; Detective Comics; The Flash; G.I. Combat; Our Army at War; Our Fighting Forces
- Awards: Inkpot Award (1995)

Irving Novick (/ˈnoʊvɪk/; April 11, 1916 – October 15, 2004) was an American comics artist who worked almost continuously from 1939 until the 1990s.

== Career ==
A graduate of the National Academy of Design, Irv Novick got his start in the workshop of Harry "A" Chesler. From about 1939 to 1946, Novick was working for MLJ Comics, the company that would later be known as Archie Comics. He became the primary artist for their superhero comics, including the characters the Shield (the first patriotic superhero), Bob Phantom, the Hangman, and Steel Sterling, until MLJ cut back on these titles to focus more on their Archie comics.

He joined the United States Army on April 17, 1943.

From 1946 to 1951, Novick worked in advertising and for the largely unsuccessful comic strips Cynthia and The Scarlet Avenger. His long association with DC Comics began when he was hired by editor Robert Kanigher, who had previously written Novick-illustrated comics for MLJ. Novick and Kanigher would be friends and colleagues for many years. Initially, Novick was primarily an artist on war comics such as Our Army at War and occasionally romance comics. Kanigher and Novick introduced the Silent Knight character in The Brave and the Bold #1 (Aug. 1955).

Novick left DC for the Johnstone and Cushing advertising agency in the 1960s, but was unhappy in advertising and was lured back to DC by Kanigher with a freelance contract, a guarantee of steady work and certain perks which was at the time unprecedented. After editorial and management changes in 1968, Novick began drawing superhero titles such as Batman, Superman's Girl Friend, Lois Lane, and The Flash. Novick and writer Frank Robbins crafted the story which revealed the last name of Batman's butler Alfred Pennyworth in Batman #216 (Nov. 1969). The Robbins and Novick team was instrumental in returning Batman to the character's gothic roots, such as in the story "One Bullet Too Many". Robbins and Novick created the Ten-Eyed Man in Batman #226 (Nov. 1970) and the Spook in Detective Comics #434 (April 1973). He and Dennis O'Neil launched The Joker series in May 1975. Novick drew the introductions of Duela Dent in Batman Family #6 (July–Aug. 1976) and the Electrocutioner in Batman #331 (Jan. 1981). Novick continued to work, still under contract, until failing eyesight prompted his retirement in the 1990s.

== Influence ==
A panel Novick drew in All-American Men of War #89 (Jan.–Feb. 1962) of a U.S. Air Force plane shooting down an enemy plane with the onomatopoeia "WHAAM!" was later appropriated for Roy Lichtenstein's painting of that name.

== Awards ==
Irv Novick received an Inkpot Award in 1995.

== Bibliography ==
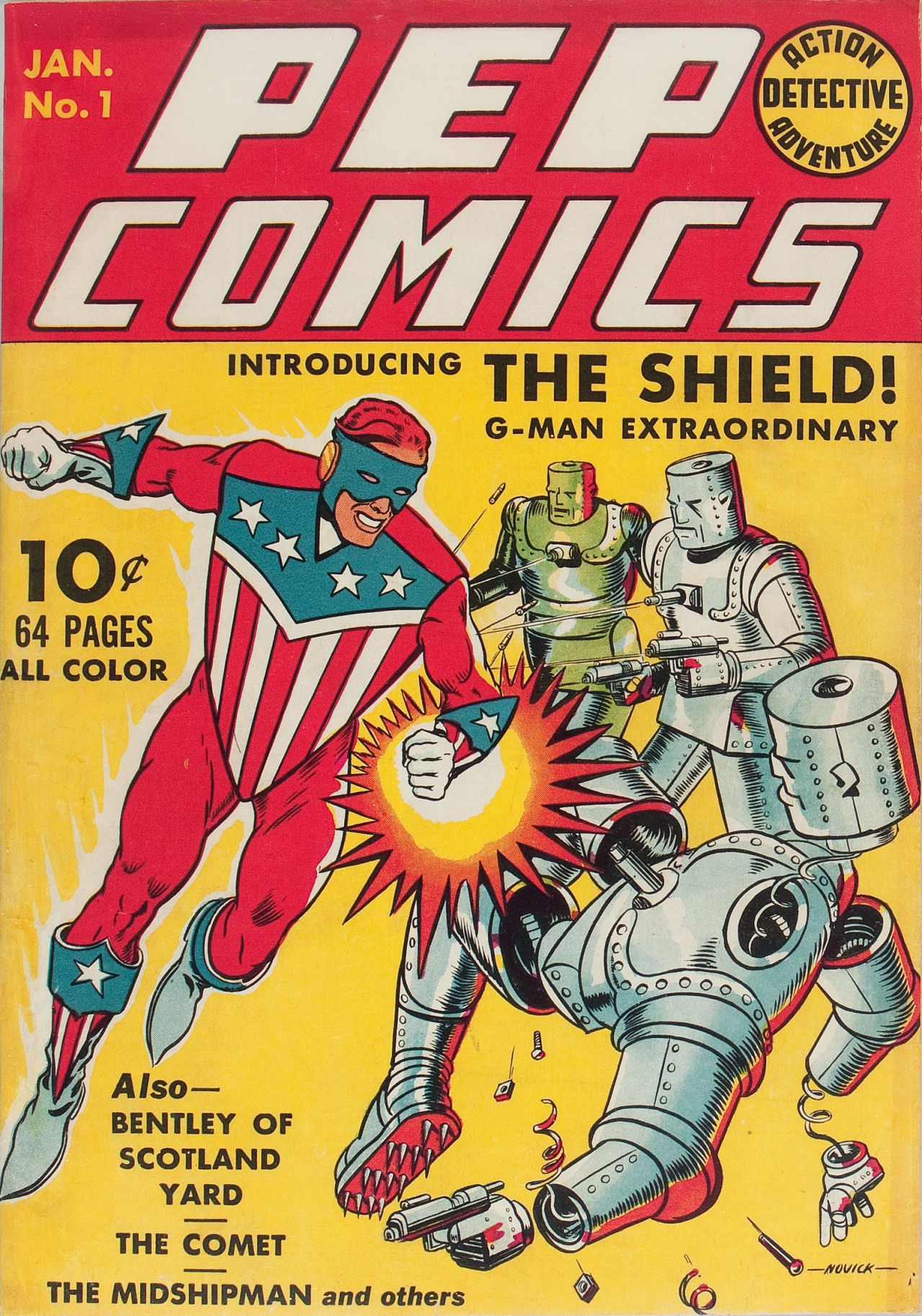
Pep Comics #1 (January 1940), the first appearance of the Shield

=== Archie Comics ===
- Archie Comics #24, 27 (1947)
- Black Hood Comics #12–17, 19 (1944–1946)
- Blue Ribbon Comics #2–3, 13–15, 19 (1939–1941)
- Hangman Comics #3–4, 6 (1942–1943)
- Jackpot Comics #1–6, 8–9 (1941–1943)
- Laugh Comics #20 (1946)
- Pep Comics #1–46, 50–64 (1940–1947)
- Shield Wizard Comics #1–9 (1940–1943)
- Top Notch Comics #1–10 (1939–1940)
- Top Notch Laugh Comics #36 (1943)
- Zip Comics #1–12, 17–41, 46–47 (1940–1944)

=== DC Comics ===
- Action Comics (Superman) #537–538, 569 (1982–1985)
- Adventure Comics (The Flash) #459–461 (1978–1979)
- All-American Men of War #127–128 (1952)
- All-American Men of War vol. 2 #4–10, 16, 19, 21–23, 25, 33, 35, 40, 45–46, 50, 54, 56, 61, 70, 77, 81–89, 92–111, 115, 117 (1953–1966)
- Batman #204–207, 209–212, 214–217, 219–222, 224–227, 229–231, 234–236, 239–242, 244–250, 252–254, 256–261, 266, 268, 271, 286, 310–311, 313–320, 322–335, 338–339, 341–342 (1968–1981)
- Batman Family (Robin) #6, 8, 12; (Robin and Batgirl) #9 (1976–1977)
- The Brave and the Bold #1–21, 88 (1955–1970)
- Captain Storm #1–11, 14, 17–18 (1964–1967)
- DC Comics Presents #40, 42, 44, 48, 60, 62, 69, 83 (1981–1985)
- DC Special Series (The Flash) #1, 11 (1977–1978)
- Detective Comics (Elongated Man) #364 (1967); (Batman) #414, 418–419, 425, 427, 431, 434–435, 489, 521–522, 595 (1971–1988); (Green Arrow) #523–525 (1983)
- Falling In Love #1, 10 (1955–1957)
- The Flash #200–204, 206–212, 215–263, 265–270 (1970–1979)
- The Flash Special #1 (1990)
- G.I. Combat #48, 50–51, 58, 75, 82, 85, 89–92, 94, 97, 110, 116, 118–120, 122–124, 127 (1957–1967)
- Girls' Love Stories #23, 27, 32, 39 (1953–1956)
- Girls' Romances #33 (1955)
- Green Lantern (Green Lantern Corps) #157–158 (1982)
- The Joker #1–2, 5–9 (1975–1976)
- Our Army at War #1–6, 8, 11–13, 15–17, 19, 21–24, 26, 28, 34–35, 40–43, 45, 55, 64, 71, 77, 82, 84, 104, 106, 122, 124, 126, 128, 154, 157, 167 (1952–1966)
- Our Fighting Forces #1–2, 5–6, 8, 12–14, 23, 26, 30–31, 57, 65, 67–68, 73–74, 93–99, 104 (1954–1966)
- Robin Hood Tales #8 (1957)
- Sea Devils #11–12, 14–15 (1963–1964)
- Secret Hearts #30, 38, 40 (1955–1957)
- Secret Origins, vol. 2, (Rocket Red) #34; (Teen Titans) Annual #3 (1988–1989)
- Showcase #53–54 (1964–1965)
- Star Spangled War Stories #13, 21, 23–25, 29–30, 35–36, 40–41, 43, 47–48, 51, 63, 65, 67, 71, 90, 98, 101–102, 109, 116, 153 (1953–1970)
- Strange Sports Stories #2, 4–5 (1973–1974)
- Superman #393, 406–407, Special #3 (1984–1985)
- The Superman Family (Mr. and Mrs. Superman) #213–215, 221 (1981–1982)
- Superman's Girl Friend, Lois Lane #82–85, 87–88, 90, 93, 96–103 (1968–1970)
- Teen Titans #8–10, 12, 45–46 (1967–1977)
- Tomahawk #113 (1967)
- Who's Who: The Definitive Directory of the DC Universe #4, 9, 18, 21, 23 (1985–1987)
- Wonder Woman #173–176, 213, 318 (1967–1984)
- World's Finest Comics (Superman and Batman) #281–282; (The Atom) #283 (1982)

=== St. John ===
- Wild Boy #15 (1955)

=== Ziff Davis ===
- Wild Boy #1–6, 8 (1951–1952)

Preceded by Chic Stone	Batman artist 1968–1976	Succeeded by José Luis García-López
Preceded by Gil Kane	The Flash artist 1970–1979	Succeeded by Rich Buckler
Preceded by John Calnan	Batman artist 1979–1981	Succeeded by Gene Colan
