= Jerry Grandenetti =

American comics artist (1926–2010)

- Born: April 15, 1926 Bronxville, New York, United States
- Died: February 19, 2010 (aged 83) East Patchogue, New York, United States
- Areas: Penciller, Inker

Charles J. "Jerry" Grandenetti (April 15, 1926 – February 19, 2010) was an American comic book artist and advertising art director, best known for his work with writer-artist Will Eisner on the celebrated comics feature "The Spirit", and for his decade-and-a-half run on many DC Comics war series. He also co-created the DC comic book Prez with Joe Simon.

Pop artist Roy Lichtenstein's 1962 drawing Jet Pilot is based on a Grandenetti comic-book panel on the cover of DC's All-American Men of War #89 (cover-dated Feb. 1962), and Lichtenstein's 1964 triptych "As I Opened Fire" is based on panels by Grandenetti in "Wingmate of Doom" in issue #90 (April 1962).

== Biography ==
=== Early life and career ===
All-American Men of War #89 (Feb. 1962). The lower-right panel is the source of Roy Lichtenstein's 1962 drawing Jet Pilot.

Grandenetti was born in the village of Bronxville in the town of Eastchester, New York, a suburb of New York City. While some biographies claim he studied art and architectural drawing at the Cartoonists and Illustrators School (later named the School of Visual Arts), in Manhattan, Grandenetti confirmed in a 2008 interview that, “No, I never went to the Cartoonist's. I did go to the Pratt Institute” following his World War II military service. Grandenetti joined the U.S. Navy "in 1942 or 1943", he recalled, and after the war attended Brooklyn's Pratt Institute on the G.I. Bill. In either 1946 or 1948 (accounts differ), he was making the rounds of comic-book companies and met Everett M. "Busy" Arnold, publisher of Quality Comics. Arnold had no position for him but sent Grandenetti to Will Eisner, writer-artist of the Sunday-newspaper comic-book section starring Eisner's celebrated character the Spirit. Grandenetti hired on as an art assistant. As The Comics Journal editor-publisher Gary Groth wrote, "By the late '40s, Eisner's participation in the strip had dwindled to a largely supervisory role. ... Eisner hired Jerry Grandenetti and Jim Dixon to occasionally ink his pencils. By 1950, [Jules] Feiffer was writing most of the strips, and Grandenetti, Dixon, and Al Wenzel were drawing them", with Grandenetti penciling as a ghost-artist, under Eisner's byline.

"Working for Eisner was exciting", Grandenetti recalled in 2005. "Although there was no such thing as teaching or showing you how to develop your craft. ... Before [the feature's] demise he tried everything. Had me penciling 'The Spirit'. Later on it was Wally Wood", who drew it through to its end in 1952, "but nothing could save 'The Spirit'! Sad, too. It was probably the greatest comic strip ever created".

In 1949, Eisner, in his sideline as a comics packager, created the feature "Secret Files of Dr. Drew" for Fiction House. Grandenetti said Eisner instructed him to draw it "in the Eisner style. Which I did, badly. Anyway, after a couple of stories I began to do my own thing". The eight-page story "The Strange Case of the Absent Floor" in Rangers Comics #47 (June 1949), which he both penciled and inked, marked Grandenetti's first credited comics art, and he remained on the feature (scripted by Eisner's office manager and future journalist Marilyn Mercer) through #60 (Aug. 1951). Grandenetti also drew "Senorita Rio" stories for the same publisher's Fight Comics.

After doing a small amount of work for Lev Gleason Publications' Boy Comics #52 (April 1960), Media's Mister Universe #1 (July 1951), American Comics Group's Adventures into the Unknown #22 (Aug. 1951), and Prize Comics' Black Magic vol. 2, #3 (Feb. 1952), Grandenetti began his 17-year run at DC Comics.

=== DC Comics ===
Our Fighting Forces #71 (Oct. 1962): One of Grandenetti's wash-tone covers

At DC, then the leading comic-book company and the home of Batman and Superman, Grandenetti drew some of everything that was not a superhero. Beginning with Western Comics #27 (Sept. 1951), Grandenetti did Western comics (All-Star Western), crime fiction (Racket Squad in Action, Gang Busters, Mr. District Attorney), science fiction (Strange Adventures), and mystery-suspense (House of Mystery), but made his mark as one of DC's signature war comics artists, drawing hundreds of anthological stories and covers in a dozen years' worth of such titles as All-American Men of War, G.I. Combat, Our Army at War, Our Fighting Forces, and Star Spangled War Stories.

DC war-comics editor and writer Robert Kanigher recalled that on the feature "Gunner and Sarge" in particular, Grandenetti "managed to get the grime and the humor of the two Marines (and, eventually their wonderful Pooch) fighting in the jungle as no one else could. Jerry liked to experiment and I had to sit on him to get him to stop it. Especially in his covers, which were outstanding, when I forced him to draw as realistically as possible". With Kanigher, Grandenetti co-created the feature "Mlle. Marie", about a World War II French Resistance fighter, in Star Spangled War Stories #84 (Aug. 1959).

Grandenetti became known for cover art rendered in wash-tone, also known as grey-tone, which, as comics-art historian Don Mangus describes, "is executed as an ink-wash drawing, and then a halftone Photostat of the cover is made, the logo added, and finally the color is laid in over this statted wash drawing", rendering a painted effect.

=== Later comics career ===
In late 1965, Grandenetti began freelancing for additional companies, drawing a small number of stories for Charlton Comics and Tower Comics, and penciling a Sub-Mariner story—inked by the character's creator, Golden Age of Comics legend Bill Everett—in Marvel Comics' Tales to Astonish #86 (Dec. 1966).

Mostly, however, Grandenetti began turning to Warren Publishing, home of the black-and-white, horror-comics magazines Creepy and Eerie. Grandenetti's work for Warren, writes comics-art historian Don Mangus, "returned to a much more expressionistic and experimental phase, building on what he had begun at Eisner's studio, or perhaps due to freedom from Kanigher’s restraints. Perhaps it was the subject matter or the fluid nature of the wash medium but whatever the case, he produced brilliant work at Warren in the late 1960s and early 1970s". Warren would later reprint his youthful work for Will Eisner with the magazine series The Spirit. Grandenetti was profiled in Creepy #42, and a self-portrait ran in Vampirella #16.

Concurrently, for DC, Grandenetti succeeded Neal Adams on the 1960s run of DC's supernatural spirit of vengeance the Spectre, drawing issues #6–10 (Oct. 1966 – June 1969). Grandenetti also helped revive the 1950s DC character the Phantom Stranger, drawing the lead story in his return appearance in Showcase #80 (Feb. 1969). In Showcase #82 (May 1969), he and writer Dennis O'Neil co-created the minor sword and sorcery character Nightmaster—originally assigned to then-newcomer Bernie Wrightson, who was taken off it after his first seven pages proved disappointing.

He contributed to at least one issue of the black-and-white humor magazine Sick (#70, Oct. 1969), edited by his friend Joe Simon, the Golden Age co-creator of Captain America, then collaborated with Simon at DC on issues of Champion Sports. The two then co-created the youth culture oddity Prez, about the first teen president of the United States, and the one-episode Green Team: Boy Millionaires, in 1st Issue Special #2 (May 1975). Grandenetti penciled a parody of the TV series Kolchak: The Night Stalker in the Marvel humor comic Arrgh! #4 (July 1975), for which he also drew the cover.

Comics historian Mark Evanier, calling Grandenetti "[o]ne of the great individual stylists of comic books in the fifties and sixties," wrote that,

As the [1960s] wore on, he got away from combat art and conventional page layouts, taking what he'd learned from [Will] Eisner and applying it in new, then-revolutionary directions. Like most artists who departed from the conventional, his work was loved by many but disliked by some. … [B]y the early seventies, Grandenetti was working so far outside even the relaxed conventions of DC Comics that he no longer quite fit in. I thought he was a marvelous, distinct talent who wasn't precisely suited to the work he was assigned, like The Spectre, Prez and "Nightmaster".

Grandenetti continued to freelance occasional stories for DC through at least G.I. Combat #270 (Oct. 1984).

=== Later life ===
In 1990, Grandenetti became an art director at the large advertising agency Young & Rubicam. Breaking into advertising, he recalled, "wasn't really [tough] because, unlike a lot of comic book illustrators, all of the time I had my eyes set elsewhere. I was developing that ability, while at the same time working for the comic book companies, by doing spot drawings and illustrations for small agencies. By the time I was ready, I had this well developed portfolio so I was able to break in".

As of 2005, Grandenetti was freelancing for ad agencies in New York City, and doing fine art paintings in watercolor, acrylics, and mixed media.

Grandenetti, who lived in Bellport, New York, on Long Island, died at age 83 at Brookhaven Memorial Hospital in nearby East Patchogue, New York. The official cause of death was cardiopulmonary arrest, though he also had metastatic cancer.

== Legacy ==
Pop artist Roy Lichtenstein's 1962 drawing Jet Pilot is based on a Grandenetti comic-book panel on the cover of DC's All-American Men of War #89 (Feb. 1962). Lichtenstein's 1964 triptych "As I Opened Fire" is based on panels by Grandenetti in "Wingmate of Doom" in issue #90 (April 1962).
