= Silver Car Crash (Double Disaster) =

1963 serigraph by Andy Warhol

- Artist: Andy Warhol
- Year: 1963
- Medium: acrylic on canvas
- Dimensions: 243 cm × 400 cm (96 in × 160 in)
- Location: Private collection

Silver Car Crash (Double Disaster) is a 1963 serigraph by the American artist Andy Warhol. In November 2013, it sold for $105 million (£65.5m) at NYC auction, setting a new highest price for a work by Warhol. The serigraph is part and parcel of the Death and Disaster Series created by the artist between 1962 and 1967.

== History ==
Silver Car Crash (Double Disaster) depicts a body twisted in the mangled interior of a silver car. It was printed by Andy Warhol at the age of 35. It is the last serigraph of the artist that was left in private hands. The serigraph measures 8 by 13 feet (2.4 by 4.0 m) and was displayed only once in public during the last 26 years. The work was part of his Death and Disaster series.

The art masterpiece was held by a European collector for 20 years. In November 2013, five bidders fought for the serigraph in an auction of contemporary art works organized by Sotheby's, bringing the final price to $105 million, not only surpassing its estimate of $60–80 million but also breaking the previous auction record for a Warhol serigraph, Eight Elvises, that last sold at auction for $100 million. The name of the winning bidder was never publicly disclosed.

== See also ==
- List of most expensive paintings
