= Star Spangled War Stories =

Comics anthologies

- Cover to Star Spangled War Stories #3 (November 1952), art by Curt Swan.

Publication information
- Publisher: DC Comics
- Schedule: Monthly: #1–87, #167–179, #185–199; Bimonthly: #88–166, #180–184, #200–204
- Format: Ongoing series
- Publication date: Vol. 1: August 1952–October 1952; Vol. 2: November 1952 – February–March 1977; Vol. 3: September 2014–May 2015
- No. of issues: Vol. 1: 3 Vol. 2: 202; Vol. 3: 8 and a Star Spangled War Stories: Futures End one-shot
- Main character(s): Mademoiselle Marie "The War that Time Forgot" the Enemy Ace the Unknown Soldier
- Editor: List: Vol. 1: Murray Boltinoff (#131–133 and #3–17) Robert Kanigher (#18–137) Joe Kubert (#138–166) Archie Goodwin (#167–182) Joe Orlando (#183–204) Vol. 2: Joey Cavalieri (#1–8)

Star Spangled War Stories is the title of a comics anthology published by DC Comics that featured war-themed characters and stories. Among the features published in this series were writer-editor Robert Kanigher and artist Jerry Grandenetti's "Mademoiselle Marie", about a World War II French Resistance fighter, debuting in #84 (Aug. 1959); The War that Time Forgot featuring the Suicide Squad, the "Enemy Ace" and the "Unknown Soldier".

== Publication history ==
=== Original series ===
Initially, Star Spangled War Stories was a retitling of Star-Spangled Comics and continued the numbering of its predecessor with #131. That lasted until #133, when DC rebooted the numbering with issue #3 — even though there had already been three issues before that. The end result was that there are two separate comics numbered as Star Spangled War Stories #131, #132 and #133 — the ones issued in 1952 and the ones issued in 1967. "The War that Time Forgot" was an ongoing feature introduced by writer Robert Kanigher and artist Ross Andru in issue #90 (May 1960). The Unknown Soldier became the lead feature in #151 (June–July 1970).

Star-Spangled War Stories ran for over 200 issues from 1952 to 1977. The series ended with issue #204. With #205, the numbering resumed under the title of The Unknown Soldier.

=== The New 52 ===
An ongoing series, Star Spangled War Stories Featuring G.I. Zombie, set in the present-day New 52 DC Universe debuted in September 2014. This series was canceled as of issue #8 (May 2015) which went on sale in March.

== Creators associated with Star Spangled War Stories ==
Writers who worked on Star-Spangled War Stories include Kanigher (its editor) and David Michelinie, Ed Herron, Bill Finger, and Bob Haney. Among the artists who contributed were Neal Adams, Ross Andru, Gene Colan, Mort Drucker, Mike Esposito, Russ Heath, Carmine Infantino, Bernard Krigstein, Joe Kubert, Leonard Starr, and Curt Swan.

== Awards ==
The series won the 1969 Alley Award for "Best War Title".

== Collected editions ==
- America at War includes Star Spangled War Stories #87: "T.N.T. Spotlight" by Robert Kanigher and Mort Drucker; #134: "The Killing Ground" by Kanigher and Neal Adams; and #183: "8,000 to One" by David Michelinie and Gerry Taloac, 247 pages, July 1979, ISBN 978-0671249533
- Showcase Presents: The War that Time Forgot Vol. 1 collects "The War that Time Forgot" stories from Star Spangled War Stories #90-137, 560 pages, June 2007, ISBN 978-1401212537
- DC Universe Illustrated by Neal Adams Vol. 1 includes Star Spangled War Stories #134: "The Killing Ground" by Robert Kanigher and Neal Adams and #144: "Death Takes No Holiday" by Kanigher, Adams, and Joe Kubert, 192 pages, January 2009, ISBN 1401219179
- Showcase Presents: Enemy Ace Vol. 1 collects "Enemy Ace" stories from Star-Spangled War Stories #138-152, 158, 181-183, 200, 552 pages, February 2008, ISBN 978-1401217211
- Showcase Presents: The Unknown Soldier Vol. 1 collects "Unknown Soldier" stories from Star Spangled War Stories #151-190, 544 pages, November 2006, ISBN 978-1401210908
- The Art of Walter Simonson includes Star Spangled War Stories #170: "U. F. M." and Star Spangled War Stories #180: "Return" both by Gerry Boudreau and Walt Simonson, 208 pages, June 1989, ISBN 0930289412
- Showcase Presents: The Unknown Soldier Vol. 2 collects "Unknown Soldier" stories from Star Spangled War Stories #191-204, 592 pages, July 2013, ISBN 1-4012-4081-X
