= Jet Pilot (Lichtenstein) =

Painting by Roy Lichtenstein

- Artist: Roy Lichtenstein
- Year: 1962
- Movement: Pop art
- Dimensions: 38.1 cm × 43.2 cm (15 in × 17 in)
- Location: Yale University Art Gallery; New Haven

Jet Pilot is a 1962 pop art work done in graphite pencil by Roy Lichtenstein. Like many of Lichtenstein's works from this time period, it was inspired by a comic book image, but he made notable modifications of the source in his work.

== Background ==
The source of Jet Pilot was All American Men of War #89 (l), January–February 1962, National Periodical Publications (DC)

In the mid-1970s the work was owned by Richard Brown Baker, who had acquired the work in May 1963. As of 2013 it is owned by the Yale University Art Gallery, which also hosts the related work Blam.

Lichtenstein was a trained United States Army pilot, draftsman and artist as well as a World War II (WWII) veteran who never saw active combat. His list of aeronautical themed works is extensive. Within that genre, Lichtenstein has produced several works featuring pilots situated in cockpits during air combat such as Jet Pilot (1962), Brattata (1962), Bratatat! (1963), and Okay Hot-Shot, Okay! (1963).

Jet Pilot is one of several drawings that Lichtenstein has done in a frottage technique, in a time before he routinely used the Ben-Day dots for which he is better known. This work has been on a worldwide tour of Lichtenstein's 1961–68 black-and-white sketches, accompanied by DC Comics artwork.

The source of Jet Pilot was All American Men of War #89 (January–February 1962, DC Comics). Jet Pilot is one of several comics-based works, including Okay Hot-Shot, Okay! and Von Karp, inspired by the World War II Navajo U.S. Air Force fighter pilot Johnny Cloud of DC Comics' The Losers. The same All American Men of War issue was the inspiration for several other Lichtenstein paintings, Okay Hot-Shot, Okay!, Brattata, Blam, Whaam! and Tex!

== Critical appraisal ==
Lichtenstein usually simplified from his source material, but in Jet Pilot the gun sight is more detailed than in the source. In Lichtenstein's image the line of enemy bullets follows a different path, thereby reducing the suspense caused in the source as the bullets ruptured the pilot's air hose. The work also is related to Lichtenstein's theme of "machine and embodied vision" as exhibited in works such as Crak!, Okay Hot-Shot, Okay!, and Bratatat!.

== See also ==
- 1962 in art
