= Engagement Ring (Lichtenstein) =

Painting by Roy Lichtenstein

- Artist: Roy Lichtenstein
- Year: 1961
- Movement: Pop art
- Dimensions: 172.1 cm × 201.9 cm (67 3/4 in × 79 1/2 in)

Engagement Ring is a 1961 pop art painting by Roy Lichtenstein. The work is based on the Winnie Winkle series, but Lichtenstein changed both the graphical description and the narrative accompaniment that he presents in a speech balloon. As with most of his early romance comics works, this consisted of "a boy and a girl connected by romantic dialogue and action".

== Details ==
The source for Engagement Ring was the July 16, 1961 Winnie Winkle by Martin Branner

The original source was a Martin Branner panel from the July 16, 1961 Winnie Winkle published in the Chicago Tribune. Measuring 172.1 cm × 201.9 cm (67 3/4 in × 79 1/2 in), Engagement Ring's "patchy" screen of small flesh coloring Ben-Day dots and "staccato" drawing are considered tentative. The general "rawness" of the work links it to Lichtenstein's work from the 1950s, while its "integrated formality" links it to his subsequent works. Lichtenstein used only a few basic colors, with the same red being used for the fingernails, lips, drapes, and wall, while the same yellow provided the color for the hair and the lampshade. Although the painting is considered "a fully characteristic painting, conceptually and manually", it is not as poised a composition as his subsequent works. The style of the painting is described as "dry" and with "the color compression and linear simplification of the comics are dilated to the scale of easel painting". Using a single frame of a comic book source draws the reader in without providing closure with a clear expected outcome and without explaining the circumstances.

When Lichtenstein had his first solo show at The Leo Castelli Gallery in February 1962, it sold out before opening. Engagement Ring was one of the works in the show (along with works such as Look Mickey, Blam and The Refrigerator) and it sold for $1200 ($12,772 in 2025 dollars). The show ran from February 10 through March 3. In 1962, Lichtenstein produced several paintings about engagement rings and wedding bands.

== See also ==
- 1961 in art

== General and cited references ==
- Alloway, Lawrence (1983). Roy Lichtenstein. Abbeville Press. ISBN 0-89659-331-2. OCLC 9282590.
