= Mickey (Damien Hirst) =

2012 painting by Damien Hirst

- Artist: Damien Hirst
- Year: 2012
- Type: Household gloss on canvas
- Dimensions: 182.9 cm × 105.4 cm (78 in × 58 in)
- Location: Donated by artist

Mickey is a household gloss on canvas painting by Damien Hirst executed in 2012.

== Background ==
Hirst was invited by Disney to create an artwork inspired by Mickey Mouse and this was his response. The work was auctioned at Christie's, London, on 13 February 2014 in aid of Kids Company, a charity Hirst has long supported, fetching £902,500.

The auction lot notes quote Hirst as commenting:

The thing about Mickey is that even though he’s gone through so many shifts in form and association, he’s timeless. In a way he means the same in the 21st century as he did decades ago. I watched the cartoons as a kid, and my kids watch them too. He’s relevant because he’s remained so culturally ingrained and he still just looks so great. The way children are entertained today has obviously changed dramatically, but kids are still kids, and love the same things.

It’s using simple means to capture the very essence of his form solely through the power of colour. I love that the imagery is so powerful that it only takes twelve different coloured dots to create something so instantly recognisable.

— Damien Hirst, quoted in interview December 2013

== See also ==
- Look Mickey - 1961 painting by Pop artist Roy Lichenstein based on a book illustration featuring Mickey and Donald Duck fishing
