= Roy Lichtenstein (Warhol) =

1976 painting by Andy Warhol

- Artist: Andy Warhol
- Year: 1976
- Medium: Acrylic and silkscreen ink on canvas
- Movement: Pop Art
- Subject: Roy Lichtenstein
- Dimensions: 101.6 cm × 101.6 cm (40.0 in × 40.0 in)

Roy Lichtenstein is a silkscreen painting by American artist Andy Warhol, created in 1976. It depicts Pop artist Roy Lichtenstein. The portrait is based on a Polaroid photograph of Lichtenstein taken by Warhol in Southampton, New York, in 1975. Warhol produced four portraits of Lichtenstein in various colors. One of the portraits sold for $475,000 at auction in 2019.

== Background ==
Painters Andy Warhol and Roy Lichtenstein emerged as leading figures of the Pop art movement in the early 1960s. Both artists incorporated imagery from comic books and popular culture into their work; however, they developed distinct approaches. Their professional circles overlapped in New York through art dealer Leo Castelli, who represented both artists.

In a radio interview on WBAI in New York in 1964, Lichtenstein recalled: "I saw Andy's work at Leo Castelli's about the same time I brought mine in, about the spring of 1961. And I hear that Leo had also seen Rosenquist within a few weeks. Of course, I was amazed to see Andy's work because he was doing cartoons of Nancy and Dick Tracy and they were very similar to mine."

Warhol later described his first encounter with Lichtenstein's work in his memoir POPism: The Warhol '60s (1980). His friend Ted Carey had visited the Leo Castelli Gallery and encouraged him to see a painting similar to his own. Warhol recalled:

I met Ted later and we walked upstairs to the gallery. Ted was buying a Jasper Johns light bulb drawing for $475, so it was easy to maneuver ourselves into the back room, and there I saw what Ted had been telling me about a painting of a man in a rocketship with a girl in the background. I asked the guy who was showing us the stuff, "What's that over there?" He said it was a painting by a young artist named Roy Lichtenstein I asked him what he thought of it and he said, "I think it's absolutely provocative, don't you?" So I told him I did paintings that were similar and asked if he'd like to come up to my studio and look at them. We made an appointment for later that afternoon. His name was Ivan Karp.

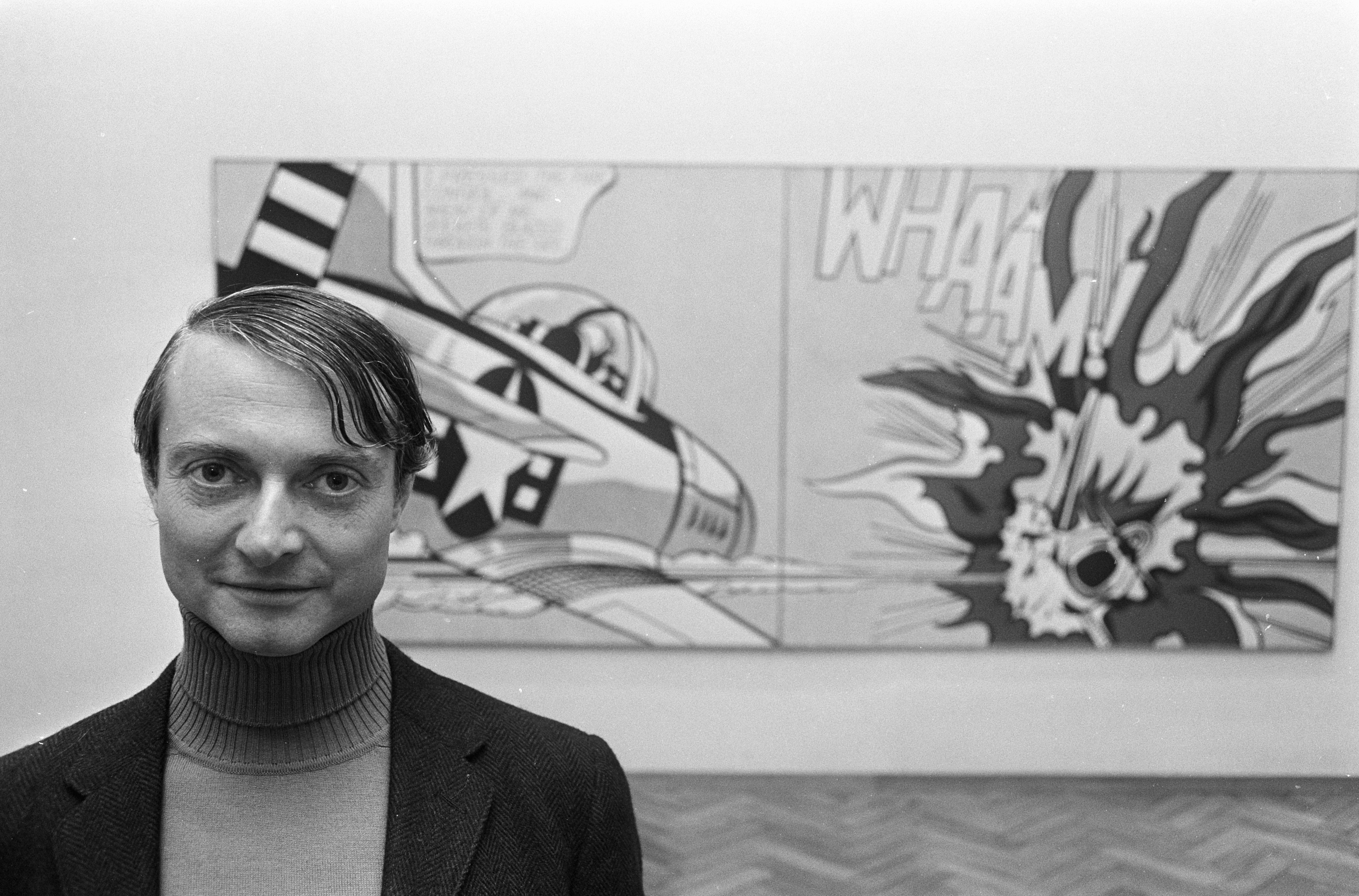
Roy Lichtenstein in front of his painting at the Stedelijk Museum in Amsterdam, 1967

Warhol recalled that Karp was surprised that he hadn't heard of Lichtenstein, "but he wasn't as surprised as I was, finding out that someone else was working with cartoon and commercial subjects, too!" When Karp brought Castelli to Warhol's studio, the dealer ultimately chose not to represent Warhol. Castelli would tell him, "Well, it's unfortunate, the timing, because I just took on Roy Lichtenstein, and the two of you in the same gallery would collide." Warhol would eventually join the Leo Castelli Gallery in 1964.

In 1965, Lichtenstein and his future wife Dorothy Herzka dressed up a Warhol and his muse Edie Sedgwick for a Halloween party. Lichtenstein later recalled: "Andy does exactly what I don't do. He was his art. His studio was his art. Edie was part of his art, and a lot of other people. I was an old-fashioned artist compared with him. When I looked at Andy, I looked at him as a tourist would, I guess... with wonderment. How glamorous. How strange."

In 1967, Warhol painted silkscreen portraits of Lichtenstein using a photograph supplied by Castelli. Warhol later created portraits of Lichtenstein's wife in 1974. In 1976, Warhol produced four portraits of Lichtenstein, based on a Polaroid photograph taken at Lichtenstein's Southampton studio the previous year.

== Description ==
Executed in acrylic and silkscreen ink on canvas, the work measures 40 × 40 inches (101.6 × 101.6 cm). Lichtenstein is depicted in a close-up with his hand against his face. The Lichtenstein portraits share the aesthetic of several Warhol's paintings that he produced between 1975 and 1976, characterized by "soft and pastel, with faraway eyes, lost under azure, mint, or lavender."

== Exhibitions ==
A portrait of Lichtenstein was included in the exhibited Andy Warhol: Portraits, which opened at the Seattle Art Museum in Seattle in November 1976 and remained on view until January 1977. The show subsequently traveled to the Denver Art Museum in Denver from February to March 1977.

Two portraits were included in the retrospective Andy Warhol: Portraits of the '70s at the Whitney Museum of American Art in New York City from November 1979 to January 1980.

One Lichtenstein portrait was included in the exhibition Andy Warhol, Portraits at the Tony Shafrazi Gallery in New York City from May 2005 to October 2005.

A portrait of Lichtenstein was included in the retrospective Andy Warhol—From A to B and Back Again at the Whitney Museum of American Art in New York City from November 2018 to March 2019.

== Critical reception ==
Reviewing the exhibition at the Seattle Art Museum, writer Jeanne Metzger of The Everett Herald noted Warhol's depictions of art world figures such as art dealer Leo Castelli, painter David Hockney, and Lichtenstein. She observed that "these most recent portraits are embellished with paint in a different way than the earlier work. The texture is smoother in most cases and the concern for composition takes on a more formal air. There is no blatancy to the colors although they are bright, and the warm, pinky flesh tones are a dominant color theme."

Art critic Carter Ratcliff discussed the portrait in context of Warhol's early career, writing: "During this period, Warhol reached back into his own history for two sitters—his dealer Leo Castelli and Roy Lichtenstein, the Pop painter Castelli chose over Warhol in 1961. … Warhol's Roy Lichtenstein (1976) is almost laughably tender—sharp features soften into youthfulness, and skin is a spread of baby pink outlined in baby blue."

== Art market ==
On May 16, 2019, Roy Lichtenstein, against a blue background, sold for $475,000 at the 20th Century & Contemporary Art Evening Sale at Phillips in New York.
