= Woman with Flowered Hat =

Painting by Roy Lichtenstein

- Artist: Roy Lichtenstein
- Year: 1963
- Medium: Magna on canvas
- Movement: Pop art
- Dimensions: 127 cm × 101.6 cm (50 in × 40 in)
- Location: Collection of Laurence Graff

Woman with Flowered Hat is a 1963 pop art painting with Magna on canvas by Roy Lichtenstein. The work is based on a Pablo Picasso portrait of Dora Maar. In May 2013, it sold for a record price for a Lichtenstein work.

== Background ==
Dora Maar au Chat (1941), by Pablo Picasso, sold at auction for $95,216,000 in 2006

Picasso painted several portraits of his lover Dora Maar in which her face is distorted in a manner similar to Lichtenstein's painting. Such portraits were an expressionist development of the fragmented forms of his earlier Cubist works. A 1941 Picasso of Maar entitled Dora Maar au Chat sold at auction for $95,216,000 in 2006.

Lichtenstein specifically used the 1939-40 portrait of Maar in the Morton G. Neumann Family Collection as the template for Woman with Flowered Hat. Neumann himself had sent a reproduction of the portrait to Lichtenstein after seeing one of Lichtenstein's earlier reworkings of a Picasso painting.

Lichtenstein painted Woman with Flowered Hat when he was pastiching various types of sources, including commercial illustrations, comic imagery and modernist masterpieces. The masterpieces represented what could have been dubbed the "canon" of art and was thought of as "high art," while the "low-art" subject matter included comic strip images. His masterworks sources included the likes of Cézanne, Mondrian and Picasso. During this time in his career, Lichtenstein noted that "the things that I have apparently parodied I actually admire." The painting is one of four variations on Picassos that Lichtenstein created during 1962 and 1963.

== Creation ==
Lichtenstein worked by creating a small-scale line-drawing based on the Picasso reproduction. He then projected the drawing onto the canvas, using the projected outline-drawing as a template. The artist deliberately avoided the easier option of projecting the reproduction itself. According to art scholar Michael Fitzgerald, this was because he wanted to be "true to his discipline of drawing". Lichtenstein attached the reproduction to the wall of his studio next to the painting as he worked on it. A photograph of the artist with the work in progress can be seen in an article on Lichtenstein that appeared in Life magazine at the time. Such evidence makes Woman with Flowered Hat "the most thoroughly documented of his variations after Picasso". Discussing the painting with Richard Brown Baker, Lichtenstein commented,

There are some changes in this from the Picasso, obviously complete changes all over, but the more obvious ones: I've changed the face-color to the pink dots and the hair-color to the yellow, since all my girls have yellow hair, almost all of them do. And I was curious to see what it would look like with a more pseudo-realistic color, sort of correcting Picasso, as though he had made an error in painting the face blue. And one of the purposes of it is to make what looks like an insensitive reproduction of the Picasso, and changing the color of the face and hair to ones that would be more conventional would be part of that insensitivity, and there is a general change in the shape of the whole position of the head.

== Auction record ==
On May 15, 2013, the painting sold for $56.1 million, including fees, at Christie's. It was bought by jeweller Laurence Graff who said: "It's a masterpiece and when you see a major one like this come up for sale, you only get one chance to get it...Plus, I've got a big birthday coming up." Graff, whose 75th birthday is on June 13, outbid three telephone bidders with a winning bid of $50 million and auction fees that brought the total to $56.1 million. The auction, which was expected to exceed $30 million, coincided with the Lichtenstein retrospective being held at the Tate Modern. The retrospective had visited The Art Institute of Chicago from May 16 to September 3, 2012 and the National Gallery of Art in Washington, D.C. from October 14, 2012 to January 13, 2013 before its February 21 to May 27 run at the Tate Modern and finale at The Centre Pompidou from July 3 to November 4, 2013. On May 9, 2012, the painting Sleeping Girl (1964) from the collection of Beatrice and Phillip Gersh had established the previous Lichtenstein record $44.8 million at Sotheby's.

== See also ==
- 1963 in art
