= Kiss II =

Painting by Roy Lichtenstein

- Artist: Roy Lichtenstein
- Year: 1962
- Movement: Pop art
- Dimensions: 144.8 cm × 172.7 cm (57 in × 68 in)
- Location: Private collection

Kiss II is a 1962 pop art painting by Roy Lichtenstein. It formerly held the record for highest auction price for a Lichtenstein painting.

In May 1990, Kiss II, sold for $6.0 million. In November 2002, Happy Tears surpassed Kiss II's Lichtenstein work record auction price, when it sold for $7.2 million.

== See also ==
- 1962 in art
