= Times Square Mural =

Mural by Roy Lichtenstein

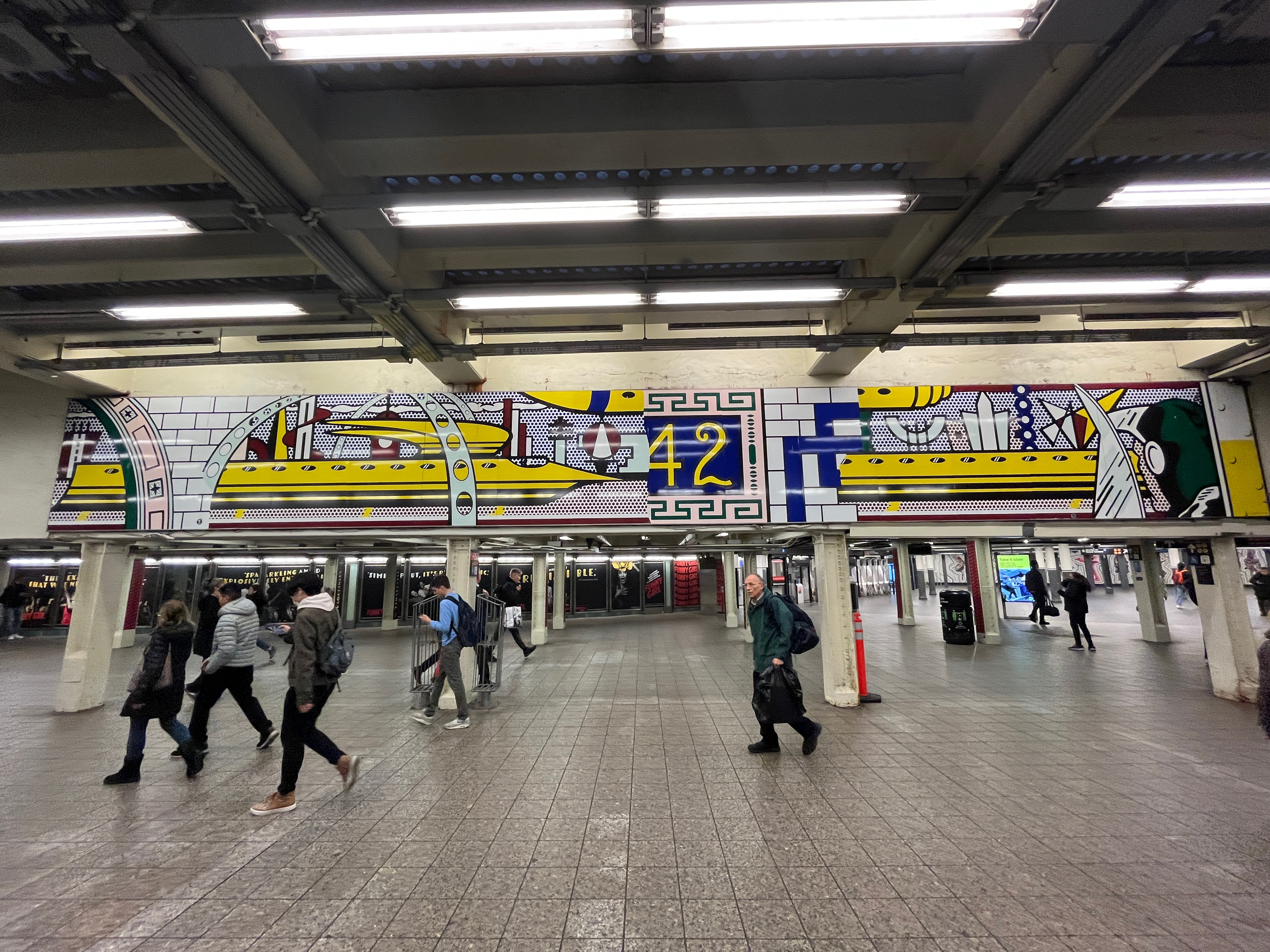
- The mural in the Times Square subway station
- Artist: Roy Lichtenstein
- Year: 1994
- Location: New York City, New York, U.S.
- 40°45′21.6″N 73°59′13.2″W

Times Square Mural is a mural by Roy Lichtenstein, fabricated in 1994 and installed in 2002 in Manhattan, New York City, United States. Located in the Times Square–42nd Street station of the New York City Subway, it is made from porcelain enamel on steel and measures 6 feet (1.8 m) by 53 feet (16 m). The work was commissioned by the Metropolitan Transportation Authority's Arts for Transit program.

== See also ==
- 1994 in art
