= Sleeping Girl (Lichtenstein) =

Painting by Roy Lichtenstein

- Artist: Roy Lichtenstein
- Year: 1964
- Movement: Pop art
- Dimensions: 91.4 cm × 91.4 cm (36 in × 36 in)

Sleeping Girl is a 1964 oil and Magna on canvas pop art painting by Roy Lichtenstein. It held the record for the highest auction price for a Lichtenstein painting from May 2012 until May 2013.

== History ==
The source panel of Sleeping Girl

The painting is based on a panel from the romance comic Girls' Romances #105 published by DC National Comics in 1964.

On May 9, 2012, the comic painting Sleeping Girl (1964) from the collection of Beatrice and Phillip Gersh established a new Lichtenstein record $44.8 million at Sotheby's. The Gershes were instrumental in the modern and contemporary art movements in Southern California, especially as founding members of The Museum of Contemporary Art in Los Angeles (MOCA). The previous record for a Lichtenstein work had been established in November 2011 when I Can See the Whole Room...and There's Nobody in It! sold for $43.2 million. The record was surpassed the following year when Woman with Flowered Hat sold for $56.1 million, including fees, on May 15, 2013.

Measuring 91.4 cm × 91.4 cm (36 in × 36 in), Sleeping Girl was purchased in 1964 from the Ferus Gallery and was not sold until May 9, 2012. From April through July 1967 it was exhibited at the Pasadena Art Museum and Walker Art Center as part of the Roy Lichtenstein exhibition. Then, it was shown from November 1989 to March 1990 at the Museum of Contemporary Art, Los Angeles.

== Description ==
After 1963, Lichtenstein's comics-based women "...look hard, crisp, brittle, and uniformly modish in appearance, as if they all came out of the same pot of makeup." This particular example is one of several that are cropped so closely that the hair flows beyond the edges of the canvas. The work is noted for its use of one of art's most classic subjects: the sleeping female muse.

== See also ==
- 1964 in art
