= Bedroom in Arles =

Series of three similar paintings by Vincent van Gogh

Bedroom in Arles (first version)
- Artist: Vincent van Gogh
- Year: 1888
- Catalogue: F482; JH1608
- Medium: Oil on canvas
- Dimensions: 72 cm × 90 cm (28.3 in × 35.4 in)
- Location: Van Gogh Museum, Amsterdam

Bedroom in Arles (French: La Chambre à Arles; Dutch: Slaapkamer te Arles) is the title given to three similar paintings by 19th-century Dutch Post-Impressionist painter Vincent van Gogh.

Van Gogh's own title for this composition was simply The Bedroom (French: La Chambre à coucher). There are three authentic versions described in his letters, easily distinguishable from one another by the pictures on the wall to the right.

The painting depicts Van Gogh's bedroom at 2, Place Lamartine in Arles, Bouches-du-Rhône, France, known as the Yellow House. The door to the right opened on to the upper floor and the staircase; the door to the left was that of the guest room he held prepared for Gauguin; the window in the front wall looked on to Place Lamartine and its public gardens. This room was not rectangular but trapezoid with an obtuse angle in the left-hand corner of the front wall and an acute angle at the right.

== First version ==
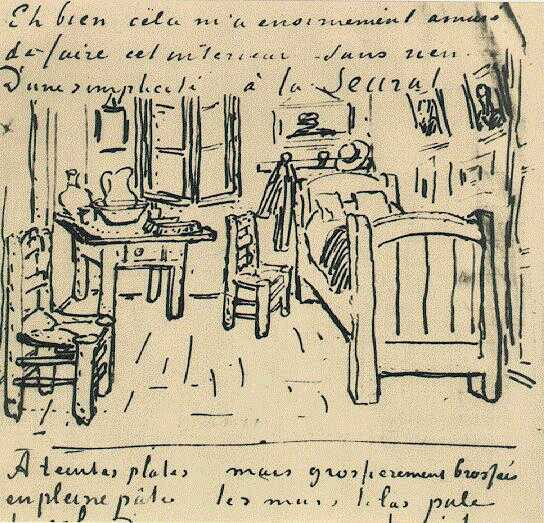
Sketch from a letter to Gauguin

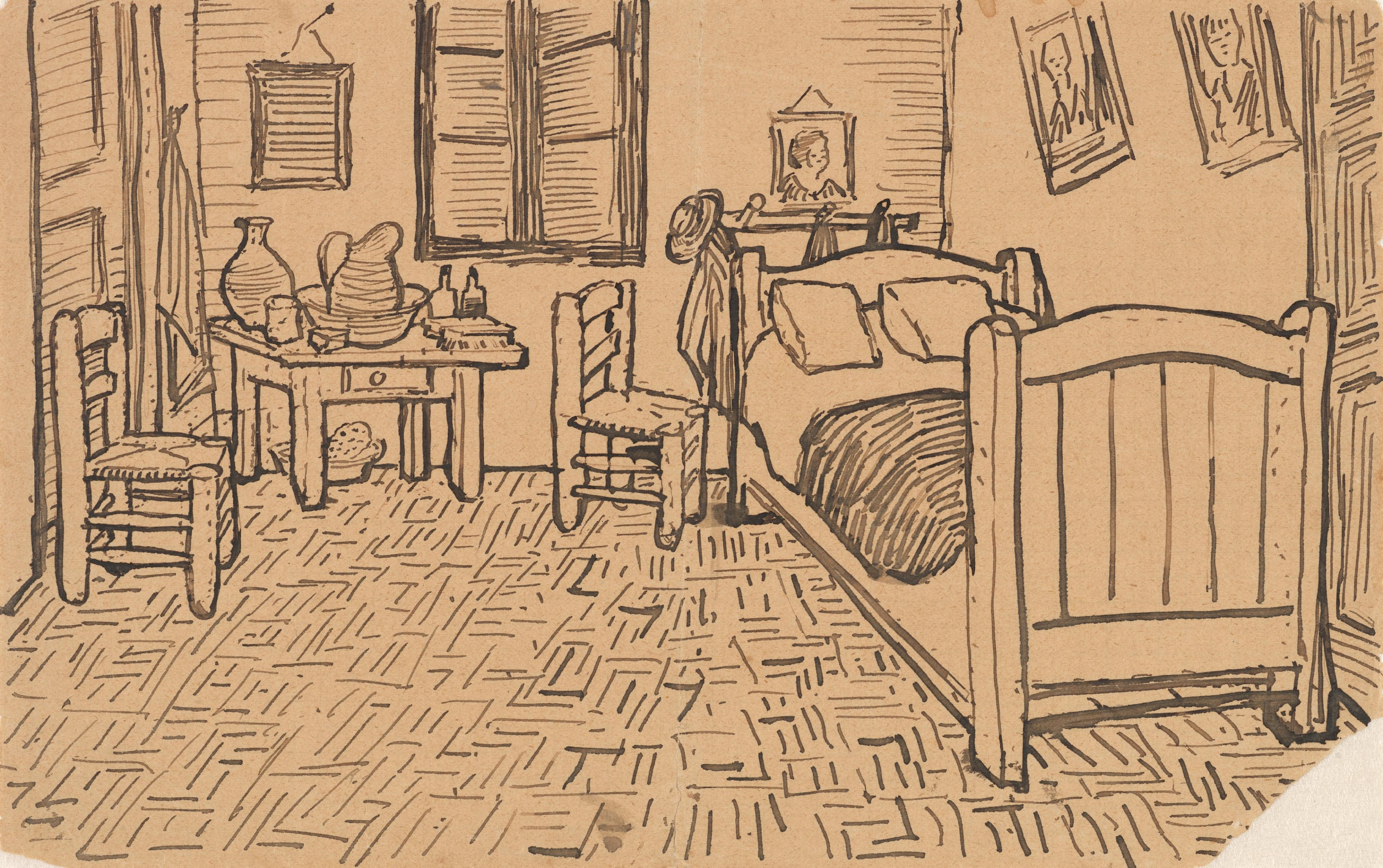
Sketch from a letter to Theo

Van Gogh started the first version during mid-October 1888 while staying in Arles, and explained his aims and means to his brother Theo:

This time it’s simply my bedroom, but the color has to do the job here, and through its being simplified by giving a grander style to things, to be suggestive here of rest or of sleep in general. In short, looking at the painting should rest the mind, or rather, the imagination. The walls are of a pale violet. The floor—is of red tiles. The bedstead and the chairs are fresh butter yellow. The sheet and the pillows very bright lemon green. The blanket scarlet red. The window green. The dressing table orange, the basin blue. The doors lilac. And that’s all—nothing in this bedroom, with its shutters closed. The solidity of the furniture should also now express unshakeable repose. Portraits on the wall, and a mirror and a hand-towel and some clothes. The frame—as there’s no white in the painting—will be white. This to take my revenge for the enforced rest that I was obliged to take. I’ll work on it again all day tomorrow, but you can see how simple the idea is. The shadows and cast shadows are removed; it’s colored in flat, plain tints like Japanese prints.

Van Gogh included sketches of the composition in this letter as well as in a letter to Gauguin, written slightly later. In the letter, van Gogh explained that the painting had come out of a sickness that left him bedridden for days. This version has on the wall to the right miniatures of van Gogh's portraits of his friends Eugène Boch and Paul-Eugène Milliet. The portrait of Eugène Boch is called The Poet and the portrait of Paul Eugène Milliet is called The Lover.

== Second version ==
In April 1889, Van Gogh sent the initial version to his brother regretting that it had been damaged by the flood of the Rhône while he was interned at the Old Hospital in Arles. Theo proposed to have it relined and sent back to him in order to copy it. This "repetition" in original scale (Van Gogh's term was "répetition") was executed in September 1889. Both paintings were then sent back to Theo.

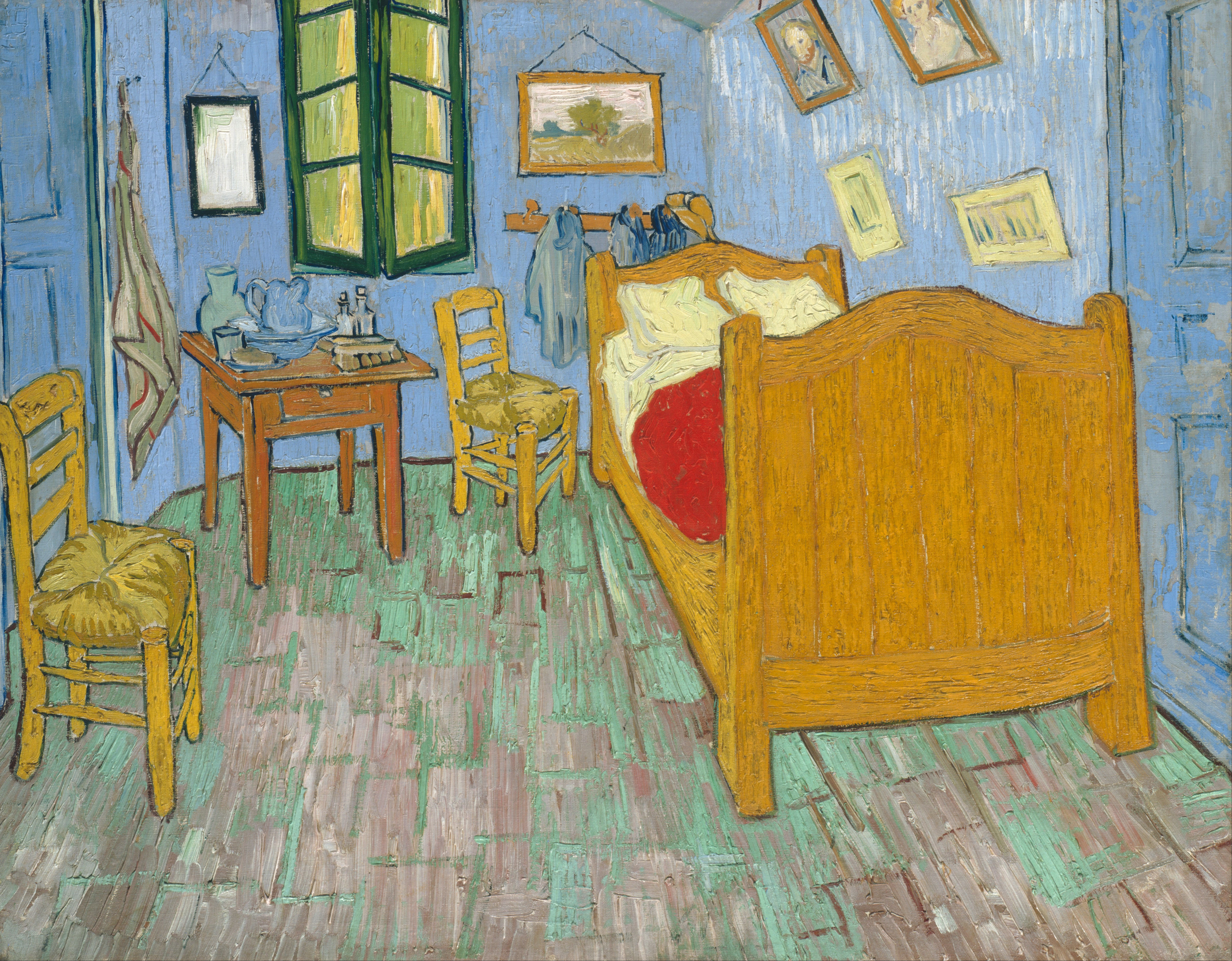
Second version (F484), September 1889. Oil on canvas, 72 x 90 cm, Art Institute of Chicago

== Third version ==
In the summer of 1889, Van Gogh decided to redo some of his "best" compositions in a smaller size (the term he used was réductions) for his mother and his sister Wil; The Bedroom was among the subjects he chose. These réductions, finished late in September 1889, are not exact copies.

In The Bedroom, the miniature portrait to the left recalls Van Gogh's Peasant of Zundert self-portrait. The one to the right cannot be linked convincingly to any existing painting by van Gogh; some have proposed that it could be a portrait of van Gogh's sister Wil.

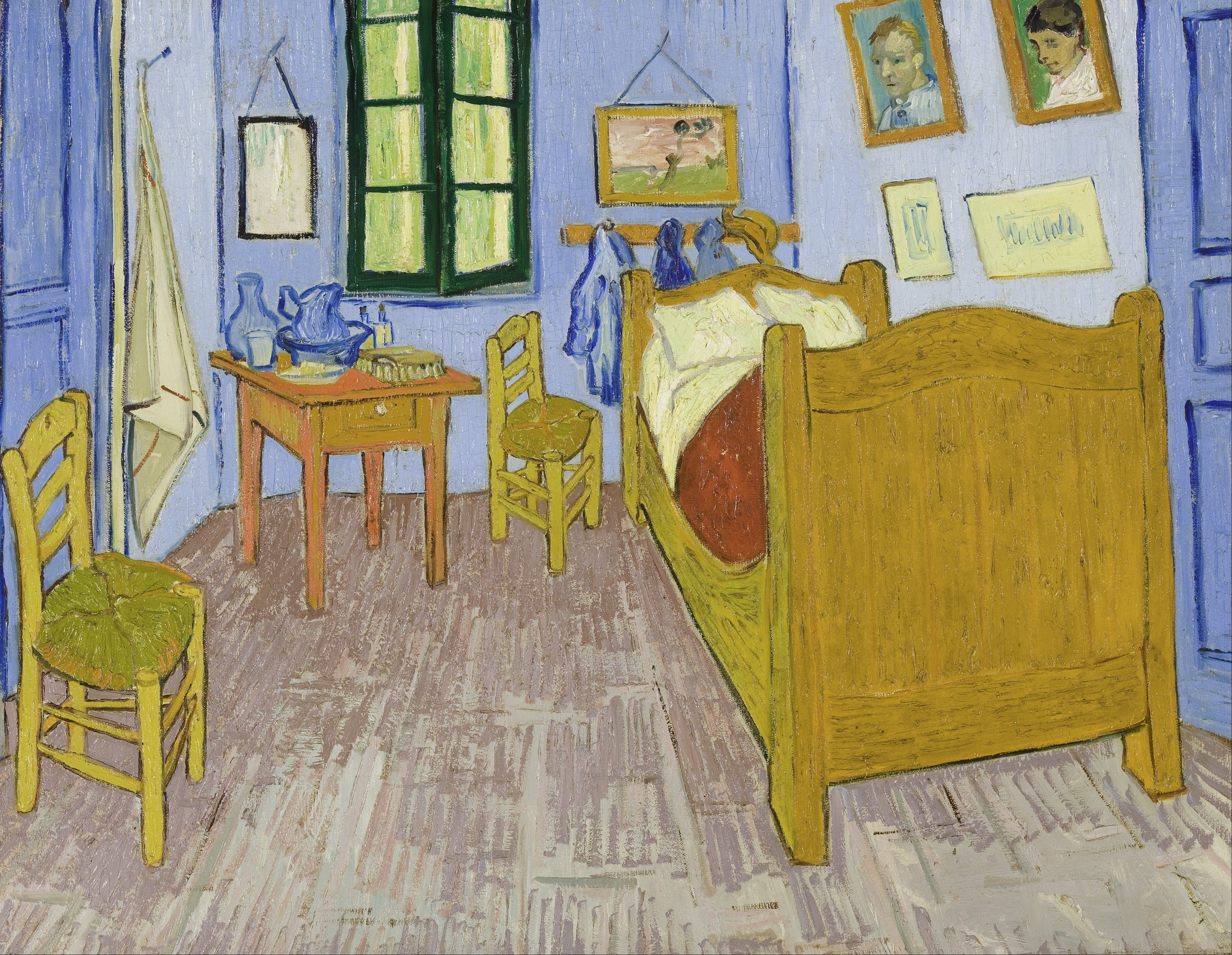
Third version (F483), end September 1889. Oil on canvas, 57.5 x 74 cm, Musée d'Orsay, Paris

== Provenance ==
- The first version never left the artist's estate. Since 1962, it has been in the possession of the Vincent van Gogh Foundation, established by Vincent Willem van Gogh, the artist's nephew, and on permanent loan to the Van Gogh Museum, Amsterdam.
- The second version has, since 1926, been the possession of the Art Institute of Chicago as part of the Helen Birch Bartlett Memorial Collection.
- The third version, formerly in the possession of Van Gogh's sister Wil and later acquired by Kojiro Matsukata, entered the French national collections in 1959, following the French-Japanese peace settlement, and is on permanent display in the Musée d'Orsay, Paris.
- All three versions of the Bedroom were brought together for an exhibition entitled Van Gogh's Bedrooms at the Art Institute of Chicago in 2016. The exhibition featured related works as well as a digital reconstruction of his bedroom.

== Legacy ==
During his career, Roy Lichtenstein, reproduced masterworks by several masters including Paul Cezanne, Piet Mondrian and Pablo Picasso. In 1992, he reproduced Bedroom in Arles as Bedroom at Arles.

== See also ==
- List of works by Vincent van Gogh
