= I Can See the Whole Room...and There's Nobody in It! =

Painting by Roy Lichtenstein

- Artist: Roy Lichtenstein
- Year: 1961
- Movement: Pop art
- Dimensions: 121.9 cm × 121.9 cm (48 in × 48 in)

I Can See the Whole Room...and There's Nobody in It! (sometimes I Can See the Whole Room and There's Nobody in It! or simply I Can See the Whole Room!) is a 1961 painting by Roy Lichtenstein. It is a painting of a man looking through a peephole. It formerly held the record for highest auction price for a Lichtenstein painting.

The work is based on a William Overgard-drawn comics panel from a Steve Roper cartoon. Lichtenstein's derivation augments the presentation of the narrative and expands the use of color in the image. As with the original the image employs the theme of vision, and focuses specifically on mechanized vision as well as monocularity.

== Description of the artwork ==
The source of I Can See the Whole Room...and There's Nobody in It! is August 6, 1961 Steve Roper cartoon

Based on a 1961 William Overgard drawing for a Steve Roper cartoon story published by the Publishers Syndicate on August 6, 1961, Lichtenstein's I Can See the Whole Room!...and There's Nobody in It! (1961) measures four-foot by four-foot and is in graphite and oil. The painting depicts a man looking through a hole in a door. His finger is extended to open a circular peephole, while simultaneously allowing the artist to present his face. The painting also uses a speech balloon.

The picture teases the viewer who is given the feeling that they are in a dark room being viewed by the main subject of the painting who is a man that peeks through a hole in the door. The narrative element of the image, which included a speech bubble that presents the caption "I Can See the Whole Room and There's Nobody in It", clarifies that the man can not see anything in the room although he has a good look at it. The work is a satirical reference to abstraction because it can be imagined as a monochrome canvas that is affected by an actor that has inserted his finger as well as a narrative that also violates this imagining. This finger is also regarded as phallic.

The speech bubble makes the entire canvas relevant by broadening the attention to the entire width of the painting and the curves of the bubble unite the narrative with several of the picture's other graphical elements. Lichtenstein has added color, including all of the primary colors, while transforming the original and making reference to mechanical reproduction via Ben-Day dots. Like Look Mickey, there is reason to describe this image as a self-portrait of sorts. The subject is extending a finger through a circular opening, which is a self-reference because it is representative of Lichtenstein's technique of stenciling Ben-day dots by pressing the fluid onto the painting surface through a screen with a device not too different in size and shape from a finger. An alternative self-representation is interpreted as a singular peephole that represents the monocular subject matter of Lichtenstein's training, while the entire canvas represents a doubt in this training's representation of the physical body, its perception and its actual view. However, the corporeal is depicted quite adequately in the intense phallicism and the dotted coloration of the skin.

The work is an example of Lichtenstein's presentation of the uncertainty of the one-eyed perspective. It is considered to be a work on the subject of "focal vision and blindness", and it is a prominent example of the theme running through Lichtenstein's art relating to vision. He uses the narrative to emphasize this theme, while playing on both the circular peephole and the circular eyes. The depicted mechanical device, a peephole in this case, forces the vision into a monocular format. Monocularity is funnelled through the primitive peephole apparatus that almost mimics a camera lens. In some senses, monocularity of this work is a strong theme that is directly embodied although only by allusion. In addition, the work is considered to be closely related to his later work, Image Duplicator (1963), which is regarded as a correction of I Can See the Whole Room! with its glaring and aggressive binocularity. The monocularity of I Can See the Whole Room! should be viewed as a concentrated form of monocularity, such as "the common experience of closing one eye in order to fix an object in the gaze", but a subordinated form of monocularity that is enhanced by technology.

== Ownership of the artwork, and at auction ==
The painting was purchased by art and design director / collector Emily Hall Tremaine and her husband in 1961 for $550. From 1961-87, Tremaine lent the artwork to many exhibitions, and she extensively facilitated reproduction of the artwork in various media. Several photos of the artwork were taken over the years as installed in a glass barn on the Tremaine farmhouse property in Madison, CT. A photograph of an installation view, featuring I can see the whole room… and there's nobody in it!, was taken as part of Louise Lawler's Tremaine pictures series in 1984. This second artwork has also been in many exhibitions over the years.

After Tremaine's death, the painting was sold at Christie's New York for $2.1 million to Steve Ross. His wife, collector Courtney Sale Ross, then sold the artwork for $43.2 million, double its estimate, at Christie's New York. It surpassed the $42.6 million record set for the artist the previous November by Ohhh...Alright... The following May, it was surpassed by Lichtenstein's Sleeping Girl, which sold for $44.8 million.

== See also ==
- 1961 in art
