= El Cap de Barcelona =

Sculpture by Roy Lichtenstein

Coordinates: 41.38093°N 2.18247°E

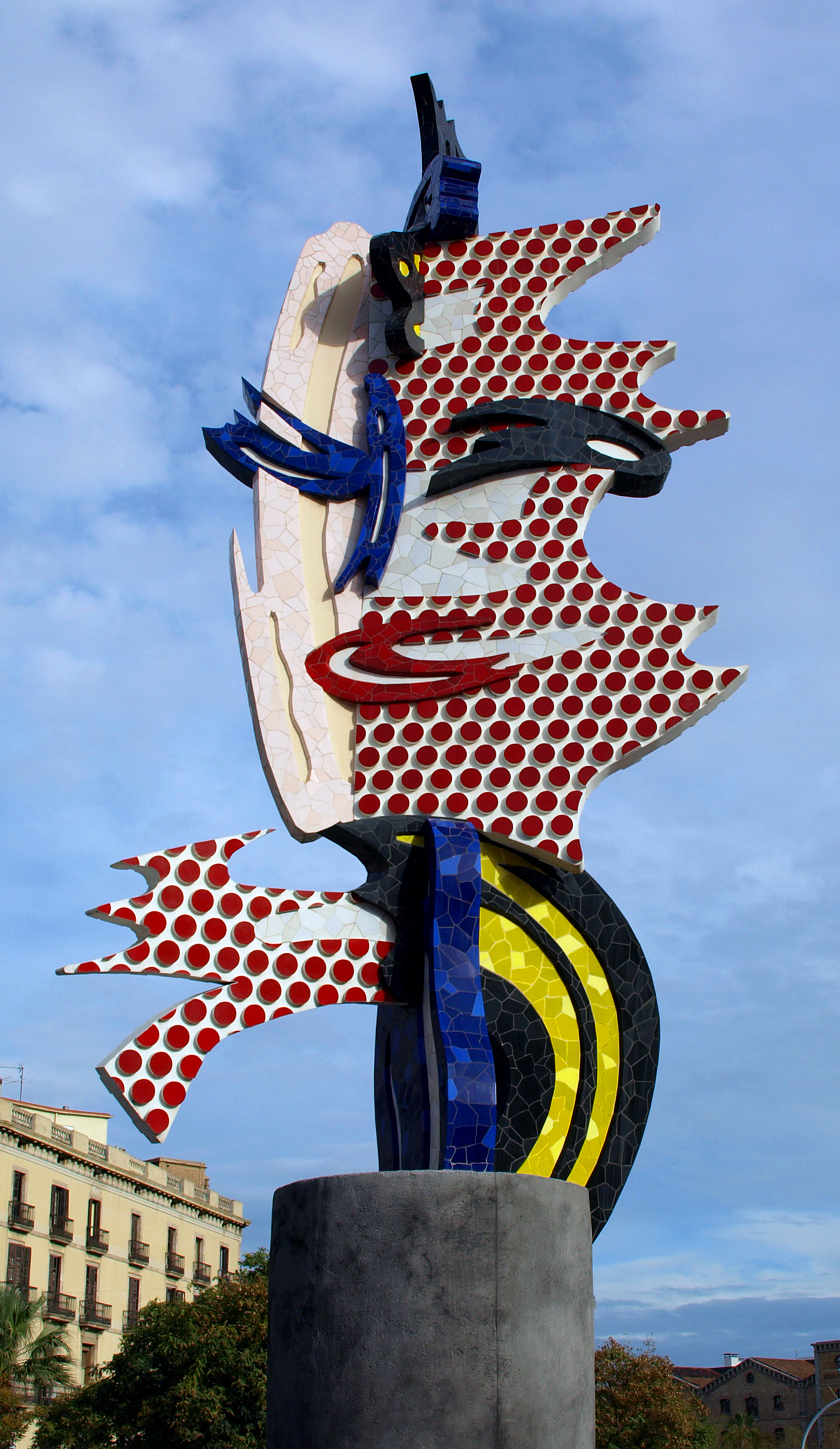
Roy Lichtenstein, El Cap de Barcelona (Barcelona Head) (1991–1992)

El Cap de Barcelona (1991–1992) is a Pop sculpture created by American artist Roy Lichtenstein for the 1992 Summer Olympics in Barcelona, Catalonia, Spain. Its English title is Brushstroke Head IV or Barcelona Head

The sculpture was Lichtenstein's first outdoor work using glazed ceramic tile. It is a reference to Antoni Gaudí and Josep Maria Jujol's trencadís (broken tile) mosaic technique.

The sculpture stands tall on the waterfront in the heart of the city. Made out of concrete, glazed ceramic tile and stainless steel, it is an abstract rendition of a woman's head and appears exactly how one would expect a Lichtenstein sculpture to be. Lichtenstein did not start experimenting with three-dimensional art until the late 1970s, and prior to this his main focus was on pop art. He mainly painted on large canvases and his paintings resembled comic-strip art; his signature use of bold primary colors, thick dark lines, thought bubbles containing context and sound effects, and dots used as a method of shading, can be seen in most of his works from 1961 and later, starting with his painting Look Mickey.

Although it is very abstract, it is clear that the sculpture was made to resemble the head and face of a woman. It is made up of thick pieces of concrete completely covered in red, yellow, blue, black and white mosaic tiles, and from far away it looks like it could be a painting. The woman's eyes look like thick blue and black brush strokes; same with her nose, and her lips look like Lichtenstein could have used a quick stroke of bright red paint. The left third of her face, the side with the blue nose and eye, is covered with white tiles, while the right two thirds of her face is covered in a grid of red dots, typical of Lichtenstein's pop-art style. Lichtenstein added other artistic elements to this sculpture as well. Below her head, what would probably be considered the woman's neck, is a tall, flat stroke of blue and white that extends all the way up through her face and ends a few inches above her head. Perpendicular to the blue and white stroke is a stroke of yellow and black, beginning at the bottom and then reappearing at the top of her head.

Similar to his sculptures from the early eighties, specifically his Brushstrokes pieces, the entire sculpture looks like it could have been painted with a few quick strokes of paint. The difference between these earlier pieces and The Head of Barcelona is that his Brushstrokes pieces are created with painted aluminum while The Head is his only piece made out of concrete and covered in mosaic tiles. The reason for this difference in his sculptures is because The Head of Barcelona was built to resemble the style of Antoni Gaudi, a Catalan architect who is famous for employing organic lines and mosaic tiles throughout his architecture, and for which Barcelona is known.

== See also ==
- Public art in Barcelona
