= Nurse (Lichtenstein) =

Painting by Roy Lichtenstein

- Artist: Roy Lichtenstein
- Year: 1964
- Dimensions: 121.9 cm (48.0 in) × 121.9 cm (48.0 in)

Nurse is a painting by American pop art painter Roy Lichtenstein made in 1964.

Nurse was at one time the 34th most expensive painting ever sold, purchased on November 9, 2015, by an anonymous buyer for $95,365,000, the then-record price for a piece by an American pop art painter. It had previously sold at auction in 1995 for $1.7 million. Christie's, the auction house involved for the sale, called Nurse "a quintessential Lichtenstein heroine" and stated that the subject was taken from a 1960s comic romance novel.

== See also ==
- List of most expensive paintings
- 1964 in art
