= Bedroom at Arles =

Painting by Roy Lichtenstein

- Artist: Roy Lichtenstein
- Year: 1992
- Type: Oil and Magna on canvas
- Dimensions: 320 cm × 420 cm (130 in × 170 in)
- Location: Fitzhugh Farm, Robert and Jane Meyerhoff Collection

Bedroom at Arles is a 1992 oil and Magna on canvas painting by Roy Lichtenstein based on the Bedroom in Arles series of paintings by Vincent van Gogh. He painted it in July 1992. It is the only quotation of another painting that Lichtenstein did of an interior. It is located on the Fitzhugh Farm in Maryland in the Robert and Jane Meyerhoff Collection.

== History ==
As of 18 August 2003, the painting was part of the Robert and Jane Meyerhoff Collection housed at Fitzhugh Farm located an hour and a half north of Washington, DC. After Andrew Mellon and the original founders, the Meyerhoffs are the largest donors to the National Gallery of Art. The painting was on display at the National Gallery of Art from October 1, 2009, through May 2, 2010. Drawings for the painting were donated by Lichtenstein's heirs and the Lichtenstein Foundation to the National Gallery of Art in 2005.

== Details ==
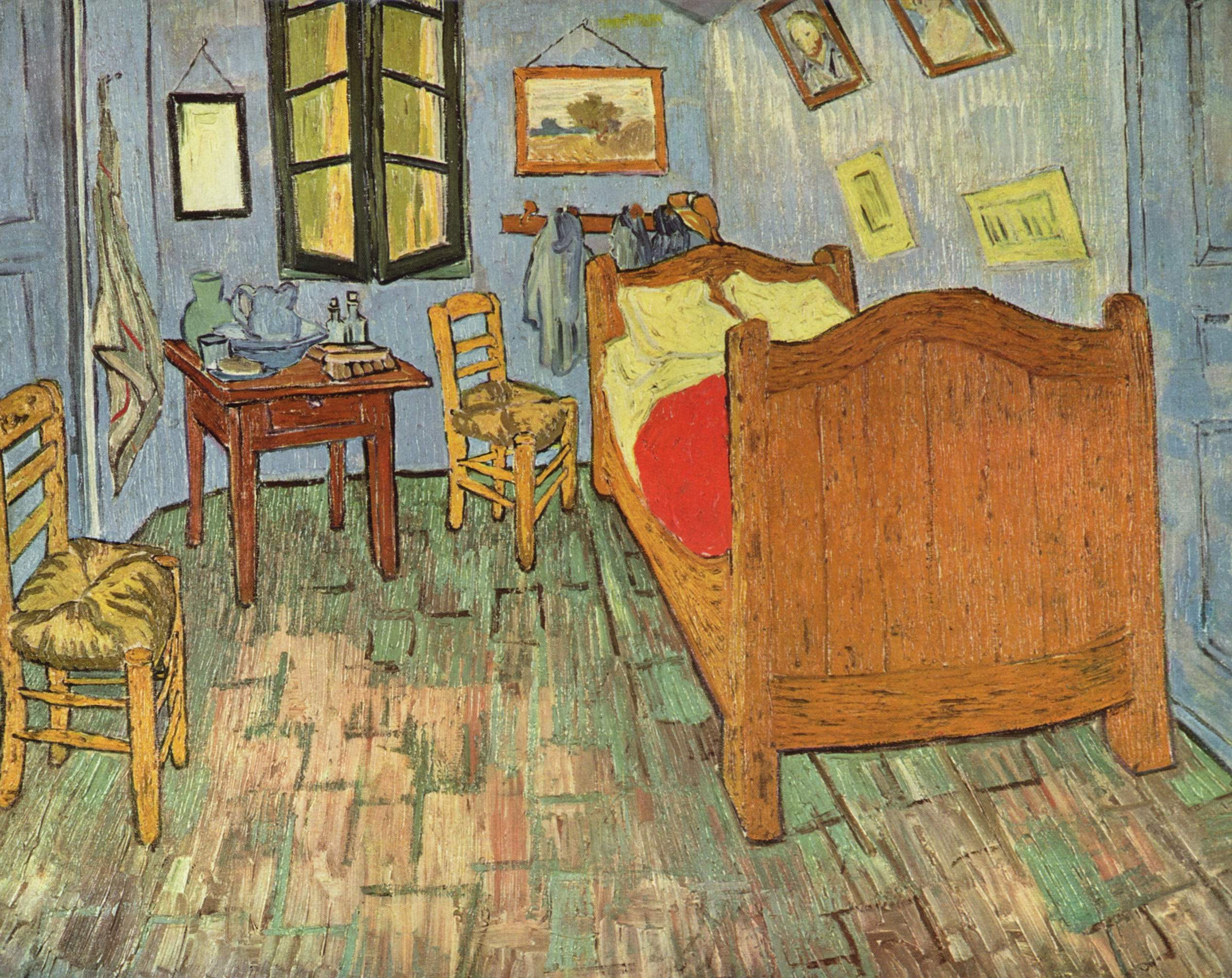
Second version of Bedroom in Arles, Vincent van Gogh, September 1889. Oil on canvas, 72 x 90 cm, Art Institute of Chicago

Lichtenstein has updated the original work by van Gogh with contemporary chairs and replaced casual shirts with businessmen's white shirts. He uses Ben-Day dots on one wall and pays homage to Expressionism's woodcuts, using wavy lines on the floor. The painting is part of Lichtenstein's early 1990s domestic interiors phase, and is supposedly based on the Art Institute of Chicago-housed second version rather than the other two versions in the series. Lichtenstein dramatically enlarged the scale of van Gogh's work from 72 cm x 90 cm to 320 cm × 420 cm (130 in × 170 in) and changed the tone from rustic to bourgeois, using Mies van der Rohe-inspired bright yellow Barcelona chairs. In fact, Lichtenstein supposedly worked from a 1993 Vincent van Gogh Calendar that included the Art Institute version.

Lichtenstein says that he cleaned up Van Gogh's version and jokes that it would be to Van Gogh's liking, although he notes that the vast contrast between his cartoonish style and the original is in and of itself humorous. He notes that his work is meticulous, while Van Gogh's was spontaneous. He also notes that his translation is no more debasing to the master than were Pablo Picasso's translations of Diego Velázquez.

== Critical review ==
Carol Vogel of The New York Times described the work as a "humorous interpretation". Aleid Head describes the color selection, which includes acid yellow and bright turquoise, as garish. According to Diane Waldman of the Solomon R. Guggenheim Museum, the painting, which presents a pedestrian perspective, successfully distances his version from the original.

== Popular culture ==
Roy Lichtenstein's painting has been adapted into a 3D installation bedroom on view in 2020 at the MOCO Museum. This installation is a response to the A 3D installation of Van Gogh's painting which was presented at the Art Institute of Chicago in 2016 among other locations.

== See also ==
- 1992 in art
