= Nudes with Beach Ball =

Painting by Roy Lichtenstein

- Artist: Roy Lichtenstein
- Year: 1994
- Movement: Pop art

Nudes with Beach Ball is a 1994 pop art painting by Roy Lichtenstein.

== See also ==
- 1994 in art
