= Ohhh...Alright... =

Painting by Roy Lichtenstein

- Artist: Roy Lichtenstein
- Year: 1964
- Movement: Pop art
- Dimensions: 91.4 cm × 96.5 cm (36 in × 38 in)

Ohhh...Alright... is a 1964 pop art painting by Roy Lichtenstein. It formerly held the record for highest auction price for a Lichtenstein painting.

== History ==
In November 2010, Ohhh...Alright..., previously owned by Steve Martin and later by Steve Wynn, was sold at a record US $42.6 million (£26.7 million) at a sale at Christie's in New York, which surpassed the 2005 $16.2 million Lichtenstein record set when In the Car sold. The hammer price was $38 million. It was surpassed in the following year by I Can See the Whole Room...and There's Nobody in It!, which sold for $43.2 million.

== Details ==
Ohhh...Alright...'s source was Secret Hearts #88, June 1963

Measuring 91.4 cm × 96.5 cm (36 in × 38 in), Ohhh...Alright... is derived from the June 1963 edition of Secret Hearts #88 by Arleigh Publishing Corp. (now part of DC Comics). After 1963, Lichtenstein's comics-based women "look hard, crisp, brittle, and uniformly modish in appearance, as if they all came out of the same pot of makeup." This particular example is one of several that are cropped so closely that the hair flows beyond the edges of the canvas. The image was featured in the edition of November 8, 1993 of Time, which discussed the 1993 Lichtenstein retrospective at the Solomon R. Guggenheim Museum. It was also the image used to promote the 2012 Lichtenstein retrospective at the Art Institute of Chicago. This was painted at the apex of Lichtenstein's use of enlarged dots, cropping and magnification of the original source.

== Exhibitions ==
The exhibition history of this work includes three 21st-century exhibitions: Las Vegas, Bellagio Gallery of Fine Art, April–September 2001; London, Hayward Gallery; Madrid, Museo Nacional Centro de Arte Reina Sofía and San Francisco Museum of Modern Art, Roy Lichtenstein: All About Art, August 2003-February 2005; New York, Gagosian Gallery, Lichtenstein: Girls, May–June 2008.

== See also ==
- 1964 in art
