= Dorothy Lichtenstein =

American philanthropist (1939–2024)

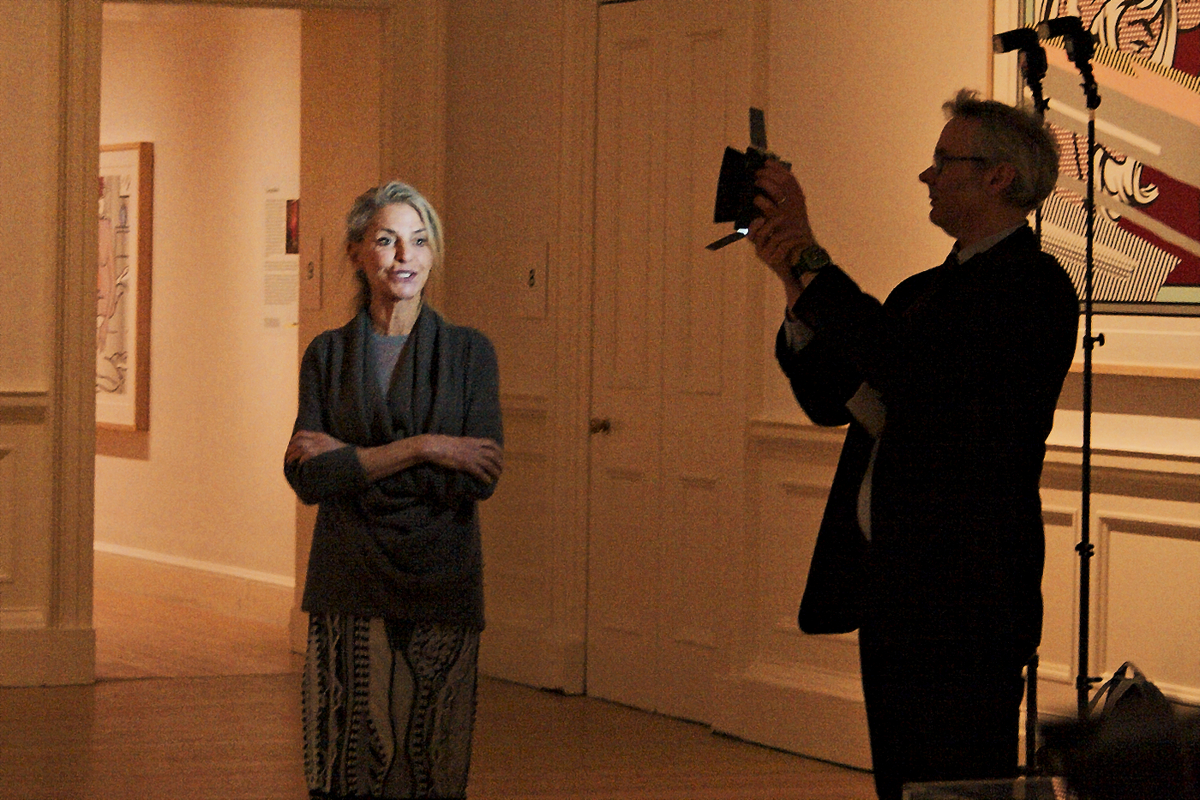
- Lichtenstein (left) with a cameraman, 2015
- Born: Dorothy Herzka; October 26, 1939; New York City, New York, U.S.
- Died: July 4, 2024 (aged 84); Southampton, New York, U.S.
- Education: Beaver College
- Occupation: Philanthropist
- Spouse: Roy Lichtenstein (m. 1968; died 1997)

Dorothy Lichtenstein (born Dorothy Herzka; October 26, 1939 – July 4, 2024) was an American philanthropist. She was the second wife of artist Roy Lichtenstein, from 1968 to his death, in 1997.

== Early life and education ==
Lichtenstein was born in the Crown Heights section of Brooklyn, New York City, on October 26, 1939 to Mathilda Thelma (Berkowitz) Herzka and Lloyd Herzka, a municipal judge. She attended Beaver College (now known as Arcadia University) in Cheltenham Township, Pennsylvania.

== Career and personal life ==
After studying art history in college, she returned to New York City in the early to mid-1960s and became the director of the Paul Bianchini Gallery on 57th Street in Manhattan. While at the Bianchini Gallery in the mid-1960s, she met and eventually married Roy Lichtenstein in 1968.

She served on the International Council at New York City's Museum of Modern Art for many years.

After the death of her husband in 1997, Lichtenstein became president of the newly founded Roy Lichtenstein Foundation from 1999 to 2024.

== Death ==
She died at her home in Southampton, New York, on July 4, 2024, at the age of 84.

== See also ==
- List of Long Islanders
- List of people from New York City
- List of philanthropists
