= Look Mickey =

1961 painting by Roy Lichtenstein

- Artist: Roy Lichtenstein
- Year: 1961
- Medium: oil on canvas
- Dimensions: 121.9 cm × 175.3 cm (48 in × 69 in)
- Location: National Gallery of Art, Washington, D.C.
- Accession: 1990.41.1

Look Mickey (also known as Look Mickey!) is a 1961 oil on canvas painting by Roy Lichtenstein. Widely regarded as the bridge between his abstract expressionism and pop art works, it is notable for its ironic humor and aesthetic value as well as being the first example of the artist's employment of Ben-Day dots, speech balloons and comic imagery as a source for a painting. The painting was bequeathed to the Washington, D.C., National Gallery of Art upon Lichtenstein's death.

Building on his late 1950s drawings of comic strip characters, Look Mickey marks Lichtenstein's first full employment of painterly techniques to reproduce almost faithful representations of pop culture and so satirize and comment upon the then developing process of mass production of visual imagery. In this, Lichtenstein pioneered a motif that became influential not only in 1960s pop art but continuing to the work of artists today. Lichtenstein borrows from a Donald Duck illustrated story book, showing Mickey Mouse and Donald Duck during a fishing mishap. However, he makes significant alterations to the original source, including modifying the color scheme and perspective and adding a speech balloon, changing the original joke.

The work dates from Lichtenstein's first solo exhibition, and is regarded by art critics as revolutionary both as a progression of pop art and as a work of modern art in general. It was later reproduced in his 1973 painting Artist's Studio—Look Mickey, which shows the painting hanging prominently on a facing wall of Lichtenstein's studio.

== Background ==
During the late 1950s and early 1960s a number of American painters began to adapt the imagery and motifs of comic strips into their work. Lichtenstein was among them, and in 1958 began to make drawings of comic strip characters. Andy Warhol produced his earliest paintings in the style in 1960. Lichtenstein, unaware of Warhol's work, produced Look Mickey and Popeye in 1961. Lichtenstein's 1961 works, especially Look Mickey, are considered a minor step from his earlier comic strip pop art.

Lichtenstein used this image from Donald Duck Lost and Found (illustrated by Bob Grant and Bob Totten) for Look Mickey.

According to the Lichtenstein Foundation, Look Mickey was based on the Little Golden Book series. The National Gallery of Art notes that the source is entitled Donald Duck Lost and Found, written in 1960 by Carl Buettner and published through Disney Enterprises. The image was illustrated by Bob Grant and Bob Totten. An alternative theory suggests that Look Mickey and Popeye were enlargements of bubble gum wrappers. This image marked the first of numerous works in which Lichtenstein cropped his source to bring the viewer closer to the scene.

A number of stories purport to tell of the moment of inspiration for Look Mickey. Critic Alice Goldfarb Marquis writes that the artist recalled one of his sons pointing to a comic book and challenging: "I bet you can't paint as good as that". Another says that the painting resulted from an effort to prove his abilities to both his son and his son's classmates who mocked Lichtenstein's hard-to-fathom abstracts. American painter Allan Kaprow once stated, in reference to a Bazooka Dubble Bubble Gum wrapper, to Lichtenstein, "You can't teach color from Cézanne, you can only teach it from something like this." Roy says, "This is the way you teach colour, and volume, and composition." Lichtenstein critiques Cezanne's intuitive process, "Cezanne's much too complicated...This collapsing of space, and several viewpoints at the same time, will go right over the heads of the students." Lichtenstein then showed him one of his Donald Duck images.

During the comic book phase of his career, Lichtenstein often slightly altered the colorization of the original source. According to Marco Livingstone, his early comic subjects comprise a "loose and improvised style clearly derived from de Kooning." Art historian Jonathan Fineberg describes a Lichtenstein painting of 1960 as an "...abstract expressionist picture with Mickey Mouse in it, related stylistically to the de Kooning Women". When Leo Castelli saw both Lichtenstein's and Warhol's large comic strip-based works, he elected to show only Lichtenstein's, causing Warhol to create the Campbell's Soup Cans series to avoid competing with the more refined style of comics Lichtenstein was then producing. He once said "I've got to do something that really will have a lot of impact that will be different enough from Lichtenstein and James Rosenquist, that will be very personal, that won't look like I'm doing exactly what they're doing." Lichtenstein's foray into comics led to the abandonment of the topic by Warhol. Although Lichtenstein continued to work with comic sources, after 1961 he avoided the easily identified sources like Popeye and Mickey Mouse.

During autumn 1961, Allan Kaprow, a fellow teacher at Rutgers University, introduced Lichenstein to art dealer Ivan Karp, the director of the Leo Castelli Gallery. Lichtenstein showed Karp several paintings, but not Look Mickey. He instead impressed him with Girl with Ball, and Karp decided to represent Lichtenstein a few weeks later.

== Description ==
The painting is one of Lichtenstein's first non-expressionist works, and marks his initial employment of Ben-Day dots which he used to give it an "industrial" half-tone effect. The painting is his first use both of a speech balloon and comics as source material. The work has visible pencil marks and was produced using a plastic-bristle dog brush to apply the oil paint onto the canvas. By the time of his death, Look Mickey was regarded as Lichtenstein's breakthrough work.

"It occurred to me one day to do something that would appear to be just the same as a comic book illustration without employing the then current symbols of art: the thick and thin paint, the calligraphic line and all that had become the hallmark of painting in the 1940s and '50s. I would make marks that would remind one of a real comic strip."

— Lichtenstein on the germination of his style

In reproducing a mass-produced illustration in a painterly style, Lichtenstein simplifies by reducing the composition to primary colors, which serves to accentuate its mass appeal and largely gives it the "pop" look. Typically, Ben-Day dots enable an artist to produce a variety of colors by using dots of a few colors to give the illusion of a broader palette. By mixing dots of different colors, like an ink jet printer, just a few colors can create a broad spectrum using only a limited number of primary hues. Lichtenstein as a painter and not a mass production printer is able to avoid this, achieving his individual color tones without blending existing hues. Instead, for each color that he wanted to include in a work, he used that color paint.

Lichtenstein made several alterations to the original work: he eliminated various figures and rotated the dock so that Donald looks off the side rather than the end. At the same time, he kept Donald and Mickey in almost the same positions as they were in the original. Lichtenstein not only redesigned the space, but also altered the position of Donald's body and fishing rod and eliminated signs of stress and exertion. He also adds a speech balloon, making Donald apparently unaware that he has failed to cast his rod, unlike in the original cartoon. Walt Disney said about Donald Duck: "He's got a big mouth, a big belligerent eye, a twistable neck and a substantial backside that's highly flexible. The duck comes near being the animator's ideal subject." Lichtenstein's painting reflects many of these physical features.

Compared to the original source, Donald leans further forward towards the water, and Mickey less so. Mickey's face is more flushed. The composition incorporates some of the foibles of comic book printing, including misalignment of the contours of the waves with the yellow sky to give rise to an area of white space.

== Interpretation ==
The large scale reproduction of a comic strip frame was considered radical and revolutionary at the time. Critics applauded the work's playfulness, inherent humor and irreverence. According to Diane Waldman of the Solomon R. Guggenheim Museum, "Look Mickey is broad comedy and falls into the category of slapstick ..." In Lichtenstein's obituary, Los Angeles Times critic Christopher Knight described the work as "a slyly hilarious riff on Abstract Expressionism". Lichtenstein's slight alterations to its "linear clarity and colour", the critic writes, add to its aesthetic value and grandeur, reinforced by his choice of scale. A common misconception about Lichtenstein comes from the fact that in his best known works, his meticulous approach to painting is purposely disguised because he superficially seeks his paintings to appear as if facsimiles of industrial produced pop culture icons. Graham Bader wrote that "Lichtenstein's painting in fact appears more the product of industrial manufacture than the very pulp image on which it is based." Look Mickey is considered self-referential in the sense that the artist is painting something through which the viewer may see elements of the artist.

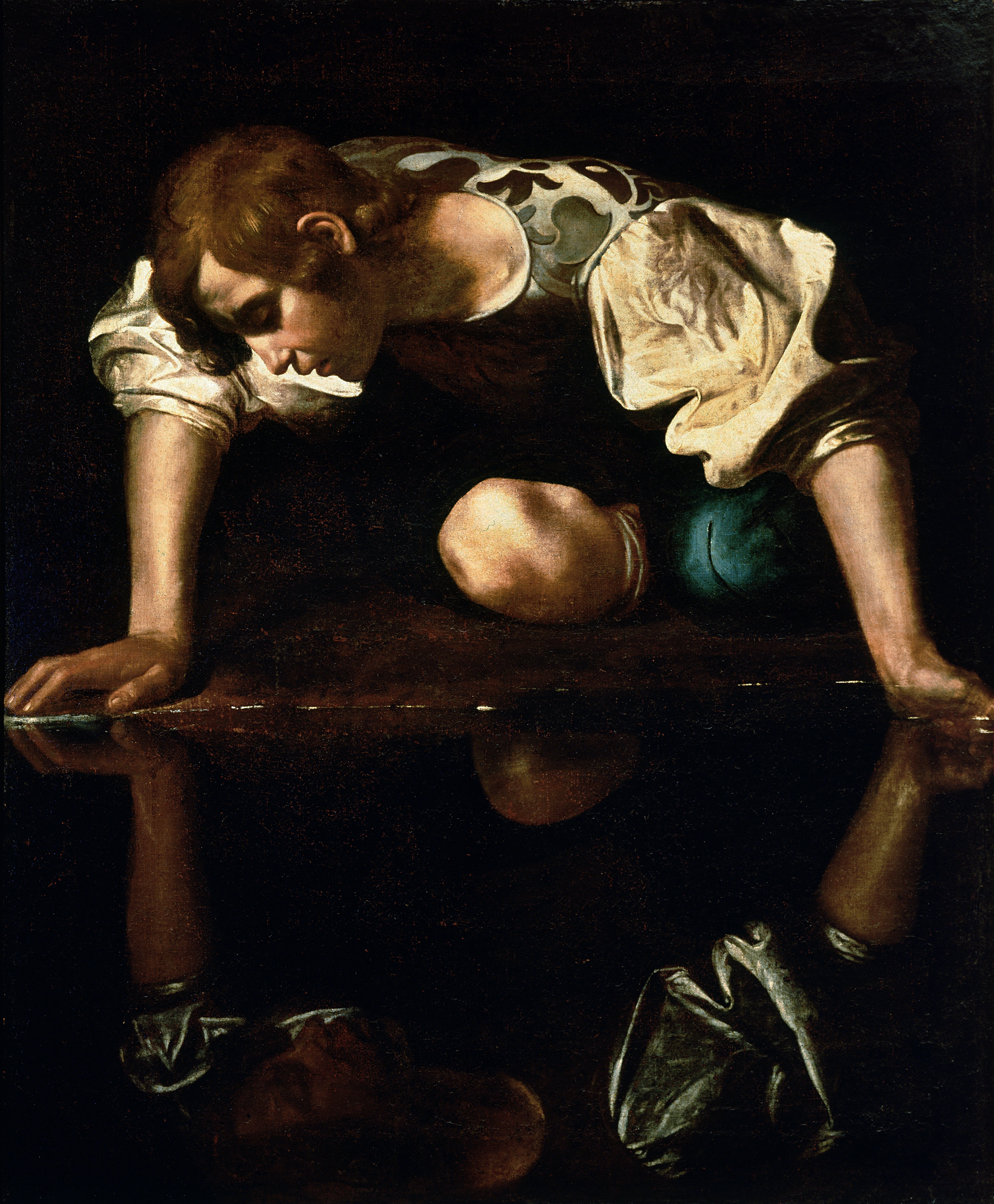
Look Mickey has reflective elements that call upon Caravaggio's Narcissus.

Bader observes that Look Mickey is concerned both with the artistic process and Lichtenstein's new painting techniques. He believes it can be considered a self-portrait in the sense that it "explicitly situates the painting's maker himself within the self-enclosed narcissistic circuit at its center". The painting shows Donald looking into the reflective water at Lichtenstein's blue 'rfl' signature "as a kind of surrogate for the image's creator", in a manner that is reminiscent of Caravaggio's Narcissus, in which the subject gazes at his own reflection on the water. This is viewed as an allegory of Lichtenstein's position as an artist trained to develop his realist instincts despite the prominence of abstract expressionism. When viewed this way, Mickey serves as the "vanguard modernist" superego towering over Lichtenstein and laughing at his retrograde efforts.

Lichtenstein uses red Ben-Day dots to color Mickey's face. According to some art critics, this gives the character the appearance of blushing. Other interpretations are that the coloration is merely skin pigmentation or that it is the hue associated with a "healthy glow," since Mickey has historically been viewed as a creature with skin rather than fur. Another interpretation – supported by the original source in which Mickey says that if Donald can land the fish he can have it for lunch – is that Mickey's face is red due to the exertion necessary to contain his disbelief and laughter while he experiences his amused superiority. Those adhering to the blushing interpretation are bolstered by the uneven blotchiness of the red dots, but others are quick to point out that Lichtenstein's Ben-Day dot technique was still in a primitive stage. He did not develop the use of a stencil (i.e. the technique of pressing the liquid paint onto the surface through a screen of dots) to present uniformly distributed dots until 1963.

It is precisely this tension—between heightened sensation and absolute numbness, bodily exuberance and the deadening of sensory experience—that animates Look Mickey."

— Graham Bader

Graham Bader, describing it as the engine of the painting's narrative, notes the intrigue created by the juxtaposition of Donald's heightened sense of visual perception as it relates to his anticipated catch, and his deadened sense of tactile perception as it relates to having a fishing hook in the back of his own shirt. In this sense, Lichtenstein has chosen to depict a source that has as its subject a divide between raised visual awareness and an absent sense of touch:

Donald is an explicitly divided subject, all sensory experience on one end and, literally, numbness on the other (and, visually, all depth and all flatness – for Donald's face is by far the painting's most spatially illusionistic element, while his caught jacket, merged with the schematic waves behind it, emphatically one of its flattest). Indeed, Donald is a portrait of precisely the separation of sight and feeling, vision and touch… What divides vision and touch in Look Mickey, what marks this shift between them, is text: the words that Donald (and Lichtenstein) introduces to the scene, and which the duck's pole-cum-brush passes through before snagging his own back end.

— Bader

Lichtenstein frequently explored vision-related themes after he began to work in the pop art genre; early examples include I Can See the Whole Room...and There's Nobody in It! and Look Mickey. In this painting, Donald's large eyes indicate his belief that he has caught something big while Mickey's small eyes indicate his disbelief that Donald has caught anything significant. Like Lichenstein's works with subjects looking through a periscope (Torpedo...Los!), a mirror (Girl in Mirror) or a peephole (I Can See the Whole Room ... and There's Nobody in It!), Look Mickey, with a subject looking at his reflection in the water, is a prominent example of the theme of vision. He uses narrative to emphasize this motif, while presenting several visual elements.

== Legacy ==
Artist's Studio—Look Mickey

The painting was included in Lichtenstein's first solo exhibition at The Leo Castelli Gallery, a show in which all the works had pre-sold before its opening in February 1962. The exhibition, which ran from February 10 through March 3, 1962, included Engagement Ring, Blam and The Refrigerator. He included the painting in his Artist's Studio—Look Mickey (1973), showing it hanging prominently on the wall of the pictorial space intended to depict his studio as the ideal studio, and implying that his popularity with critic and public ratifies his choice of popular culture subject matter. Reflecting on Look Mickey many years later, he said:

The idea of doing [a cartoon painting] without apparent alteration just occurred to me ... and I did one really almost half seriously to get an idea of what it might look like. And as I was painting this painting I kind of got interested in organizing it as a painting and brought it to some kind of conclusion as an aesthetic statement, which I hadn't really intended to do to begin with. And then I really went back to my other kind of painting, which was pretty abstract. Or tried to. But I had this cartoon painting in my studio, and it was a little too formidable. I couldn't keep my eyes off it, and it sort of prevented me from painting in any other way, and then I decided this stuff was really serious ... I would say I had it on my easel for a week. I would just want to see what it looked like. I tried to make it a work of art. I wasn't trying just to copy. I realized that this was just so much more compelling.

— Lichtenstein,

The painting was bequeathed to the Washington National Gallery of Art after Lichtenstein's death in 1997, following a 1990 pledge in honor of the institution's 50th Anniversary. It remains in the gallery's collection, where, as of November 2012, it is on permanent view.

Harold Rosenberg once described Lichtenstein's reworking of the comics source as follows: "...the difference between a comic strip of Mickey Mouse and a Lichtenstein painting of the same was art history, or the fact that Lichtenstein paints with the idea of the museum in mind."

== See also ==
- 1961 in art
- 1962 in art
