= Roy Lichtenstein =

American pop artist (1923–1997)

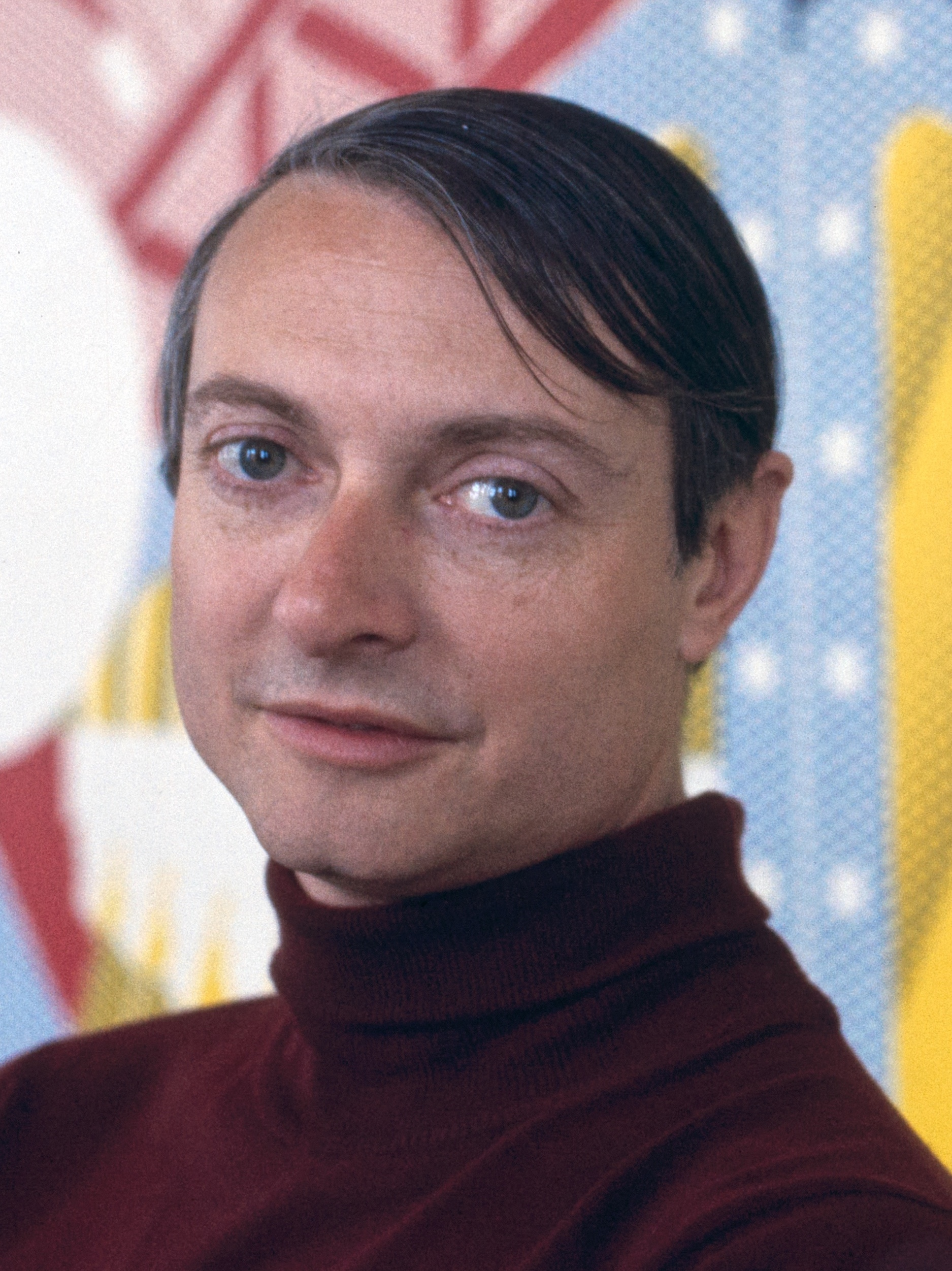
- Lichtenstein in 1969
- Born: Roy Fox Lichtenstein; October 27, 1923; New York City, U.S.
- Died: September 29, 1997 (aged 73); New York City, U.S.
- Education: Timothy Dwight School; Parsons School of Design; Ohio State University
- Known for: Painting; sculpture; printmaking
- Notable work: Look Mickey (1961); Brattata (1962); Drowning Girl (1963); In the Car (1963); Whaam! (1963); Oh, Jeff...I Love You, Too...But... (1964); Girl with Hair Ribbon (1965); Brushstrokes (1965)
- Movement: Pop art
- Spouses: Isabel Wilson (m. 1949; div. 1965); Dorothy Herzka (m. 1968)
- Children: 2, including Mitchell
- Awards: National Medal of Arts (1994)
- Patrons: Gunter Sachs

Roy Fox Lichtenstein (/ˈlɪktənˌstaɪn/ LIK-tən-STYN; October 27, 1923 – September 29, 1997) was an American artist. A leading figure of the Pop Art movement, he is best known for his large-scale paintings inspired by comic books, advertisements, and mass-produced imagery. Lichtenstein's art is represented in major museum collections worldwide, and he remains one of the most influential and recognizable artists of the 20th century.

Emerging in the early 1960s, Lichtenstein gained international recognition for works that employed bold outlines, flat colors, and his signature use of Ben-Day dots—a mechanical printing technique he meticulously replicated by hand. Through this approach, Lichtenstein challenged traditional distinctions between "high" art and popular culture, transforming seemingly banal source material into monumental, self-aware compositions. His work often explored themes of romance, war, consumerism, and art itself, frequently incorporating irony and detachment to comment on modern visual culture.

Beyond his comic-inspired paintings, Lichtenstein's wide-ranging career included sculpture, murals, prints, and reinterpretations of canonical works by artists such as Picasso, Monet, and Matisse. His best-known works include Look Mickey (1961), Whaam! (1963), and Drowning Girl (1963), which helped define his visual language and establish Pop Art as a dominant movement of the era. Lichtenstein's most expensive work, Masterpiece (1962), sold privately in 2017 for a reported $165 million.

Lichtenstein received numerous accolades during his career, including election to the American Academy of Arts and Letters in 1979 and the National Medal of Arts in 1995. Lichtenstein also received several Honorary Doctorates in Fine Art from institutions, including California Institute of the Arts, Ohio State University, and George Washington University.

== Early life and education ==
Lichtenstein was born on October 27, 1923, into an upper middle class German-Jewish family in New York City. His father, Milton, was a real estate broker, and his mother, Beatrice (née Werner), was a homemaker. Lichtenstein was raised on New York City's Upper West Side and attended public school until he was 12. Lichtenstein then attended New York's Dwight School, graduating in 1940. He first became interested in art and design as a hobby, through school. Lichtenstein was an avid jazz fan, often attending concerts at the Apollo Theater in Harlem. He frequently drew portraits of the musicians playing their instruments. In 1939, his last year of high school, Lichtenstein enrolled in summer classes at the Art Students League of New York, where he worked under the tutelage of Reginald Marsh.

Lichtenstein then left New York to study at Ohio State University, which offered studio courses and a degree in fine arts. His studies were interrupted by a three-year stint in the Army during and after World War II between 1943 and 1946. After being in training programs for languages, engineering in the Army Specialized Training Program, and pilot training, all of which were cancelled, Lichtenstein served as an orderly, draftsman, and artist.

Lichtenstein returned home to visit his dying father and was discharged from the Army with eligibility for the G.I. Bill. Lichtenstein returned to studies in Ohio under the supervision of one of his teachers, Hoyt L. Sherman, who is widely regarded to have had a significant impact on his future work (Lichtenstein would later name a new studio he funded at OSU as the Hoyt L. Sherman Studio Art Center).

Lichtenstein entered the graduate program at Ohio State University and was hired as an art instructor, a post he held on and off for the next 10 years. In 1949, Lichtenstein earned a Master of Fine Arts degree from Ohio State University.

== Career ==
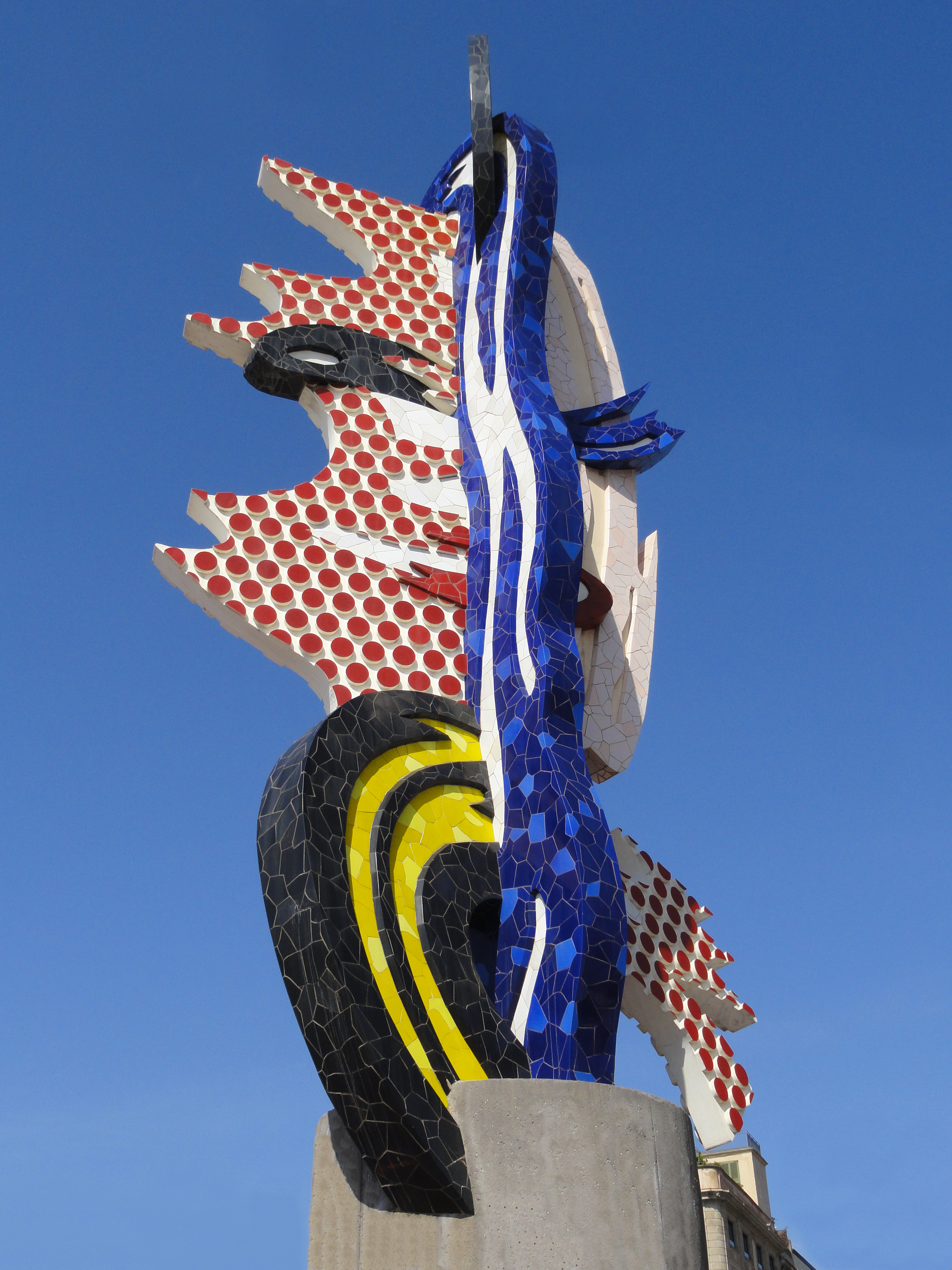
Cap de Barcelona, 1992 sculpture, mixed media, Barcelona

=== Early career and Abstract Expressionism ===
In 1951, Lichtenstein had his first solo exhibition at the Carlebach Gallery in New York. He moved to Cleveland that same year, where he remained for six years, although Lichtenstein frequently traveled back to New York. During this time, he undertook jobs as varied as a draftsman to a window decorator in between periods of painting. Lichtenstein's work at this time fluctuated between Cubism and Expressionism. In 1954, his first son, David Hoyt Lichtenstein, now a songwriter, was born. His second son, Mitchell Lichtenstein, was born two years later.

In 1957, Lichtenstein moved back to upstate New York and began teaching again. It was at this time that he adopted the Abstract Expressionism style, being a late convert to this style of painting. Lichtenstein began teaching in upstate New York at the State University of New York at Oswego in 1958. Around this time, he began to incorporate hidden images of cartoon characters such as Mickey Mouse and Bugs Bunny into his abstract works.

=== Breakthrough and Pop Art ===
In 1960, Lichtenstein started teaching at Rutgers University where he was heavily influenced by Allan Kaprow, who was also a teacher at the university. This environment helped reignite Lichtenstein's interest in Proto-pop imagery. In 1961, he began his first pop paintings using cartoon images and techniques derived from the appearance of commercial printing. This phase would continue to 1965, and included the use of advertising imagery suggesting consumerism and homemaking. Lichtenstein's first work to feature the large-scale use of hard-edged figures and Ben-Day dots was Look Mickey (1961, National Gallery of Art, Washington, D.C.). This piece came from a challenge from one of his sons, who pointed to a Mickey Mouse comic book and said; "I bet you can't paint as good as that, eh, Dad?" That same year, Lichtenstein produced six other works with recognizable characters from gum wrappers and cartoons.

In 1961, Leo Castelli started displaying Lichtenstein's work at his gallery in New York. Lichtenstein had his first one-man show at the Castelli gallery in 1962; the entire collection was bought by influential collectors before the show even opened. A group of paintings produced between 1961 and 1962 focused on solitary household objects such as sneakers, hot dogs, and golf balls. In September 1963, Lichtenstein took a leave of absence from his teaching position at Douglass College at Rutgers.

Lichtenstein's works were inspired by comics featuring war and romantic stories. "At that time," he later recounted, "I was interested in anything I could use as a subject that was emotionally strong – usually love, war, or something that was highly charged and emotional subject matter to be opposite to the removed and deliberate painting techniques". His artwork was considered to be "disruptive". Lichtenstein described Pop Art as "not 'American' painting but actually industrial painting". It was at this time that Lichtenstein began to find fame not just in America but worldwide. He moved back to New York to be at the center of the art scene and resigned from Rutgers University in 1964 to concentrate on his painting. Lichtenstein used oil and Magna (early acrylic) paint in his best known works, such as Drowning Girl (1963), which was appropriated from the lead story in DC Comics' Secret Hearts No. 83, drawn by Tony Abruzzo. (Drowning Girl now hangs in the Museum of Modern Art, New York.) Drowning Girl also features thick outlines, bold colors and Ben-Day dots, as if created by photographic reproduction. Of his own work, Lichtenstein would say that the Abstract Expressionists "put things down on the canvas and responded to what they had done, to the color positions and sizes. My style looks completely different, but the nature of putting down lines pretty much is the same; mine just don't come out looking calligraphic, like Pollock's or Kline's."

Rather than attempt to reproduce his subjects, Lichtenstein's work tackled the way in which the mass media portrays them. However, he would never take himself too seriously, saying: "I think my work is different from comic strips – but I wouldn't call it transformation; I don't think that whatever is meant by it is important to art". When Lichtenstein's work was first exhibited, many art critics of the time challenged its originality. His work was harshly criticized as vulgar and empty. The title of a Life magazine article in 1964 asked, "Is He the Worst Artist in the U.S.?" Lichtenstein responded to such claims by offering responses such as the following: "The closer my work is to the original, the more threatening and critical the content. However, my work is entirely transformed in that my purpose and perception are entirely different. I think my paintings are critically transformed, but it would be difficult to prove it by any rational line of argument." He discussed experiencing this heavy criticism in an interview with April Bernard and Mimi Thompson in 1986. Suggesting that it was at times difficult to be criticized, Lichtenstein said, "I don't doubt when I'm actually painting, it's the criticism that makes you wonder, it does."

Lichtenstein's celebrated image Whaam! (1963) depicts a fighter aircraft firing a rocket into an enemy plane, with a red-and-yellow explosion. The cartoon style is heightened by the use of the onomatopoeic lettering "Whaam!" and the boxed caption "I pressed the fire control ... and ahead of me rockets blazed through the sky ..." This diptych is large in scale, measuring 1.7 x 4.0 m (5 ft 7 in x 13 ft 4 in). Whaam follows the comic strip-based themes of some of his previous paintings and is part of a body of war-themed work created between 1962 and 1964. It is one of his two notable large war-themed paintings. It was purchased by the Tate Gallery in 1966, after being exhibited at the Leo Castelli Gallery in 1963, and (now at the Tate Modern) has remained in their collection ever since. In 1968, the Darmstadt entrepreneur Karl Ströher acquired several major works by Lichtenstein, such as Nurse (1964), Compositions I (1964), We rose up slowly (1964) and Yellow and Green Brushstrokes (1966). After being on loan at the Hessiches Landesmuseum Darmstadt for several years, the founding director of the Museum für Moderne Kunst Frankfurt, Peter Iden, was able to acquire a total of 87 works from the Ströher collection in 1981, primarily American Pop Art and Minimal Art for the museum under construction until 1991.

Lichtenstein began experimenting with sculpture around 1964, demonstrating a knack for the form that was at odds with the insistent flatness of his paintings. For Head of Girl (1964), and Head with Red Shadow (1965), Lichtenstein collaborated with a ceramicist who sculpted the form of the head out of clay. He then applied a glaze to create the same sort of graphic motifs that he used in his paintings; the application of black lines and Ben-Day dots to three-dimensional objects resulted in a flattening of the form.

=== Comic book imagery ===
Most of Lichtenstein's best-known works are relatively close, but not exact, copies of comic book panels, a subject he largely abandoned in 1965, though he would occasionally incorporate comics into his work in different ways in later decades. These panels were originally drawn by such comics artists as Jack Kirby and DC Comics artists Russ Heath, Tony Abruzzo, Irv Novick, and Jerry Grandenetti, who rarely received any credit. Jack Cowart, executive director of the Lichtenstein Foundation, contests the notion that Lichtenstein was a copyist, saying: "Roy's work was a wonderment of the graphic formulae and the codification of sentiment that had been worked out by others. The panels were changed in scale, color, treatment, and in their implications. There is no exact copy." However, some have been critical of Lichtenstein's use of comic-book imagery and art pieces, especially insofar as that use has been seen as endorsement of a patronizing view of comics by the art mainstream; cartoonist Art Spiegelman commented that "Lichtenstein did no more or less for comics than Andy Warhol did for soup."

Lichtenstein's works based on enlarged panels from comic books engendered a widespread debate about their merits as art. Lichtenstein himself admitted, "I am nominally copying, but I am really restating the copied thing in other terms. In doing that, the original acquires a totally different texture. It isn't thick or thin brushstrokes, it's dots and flat colours and unyielding lines." Eddie Campbell blogged that "Lichtenstein took a tiny picture, smaller than the palm of the hand, printed in four color inks on newsprint and blew it up to the conventional size at which 'art' is made and exhibited and finished it in paint on canvas." With regard to Lichtenstein, Bill Griffith once said, "There's high art and there's low art. And then there's high art that can take low art, bring it into a high art context, appropriate it and elevate it into something else."

=== Later work ===
In 1966, Lichtenstein moved on from his imagery of the early 1960s, and began his Modern Paintings series, including over 60 paintings and accompanying drawings. Using his characteristic Ben-Day dots and geometric shapes and lines, he rendered incongruous, challenging images out of familiar architectural structures, patterns borrowed from Art Déco and other subtly evocative, often sequential, motifs. The Modern Sculpture series of 1967–1968 made reference to motifs from Art Déco architecture.

Van Gogh's Bedroom in Arles (1888)

Lichtenstein's Bedroom at Arles (1992)

In the early 1960s, Lichtenstein reproduced masterpieces by Cézanne, Mondrian, and Picasso before embarking on the Brushstrokes series in 1965. He continued to revisit this theme later in his career with works such as Bedroom at Arles that derived from Vincent van Gogh's Bedroom in Arles.

In 1970, Lichtenstein was commissioned by the Los Angeles County Museum of Art (within its Art and Technology program developed between 1967 and 1971) to make a film. With the help of Universal Film Studios, the artist conceived of, and produced, Three Landscapes, a film of marine landscapes, directly related to a series of collages with landscape themes he created between 1964 and 1966. Although Lichtenstein had planned to produce 15 short films, the three-screen installation – made with New York-based independent filmmaker Joel Freedman – turned out to be the artist's only venture into the medium.

Also in 1970, Lichtenstein purchased a former carriage house in Southampton, Long Island, built a studio on the property, and spent the rest of the 1970s in relative seclusion. In the 1970s and 1980s, his style began to loosen and he expanded on what he had done before. Lichtenstein began a series of Mirrors paintings in 1969. By 1970, while continuing on the Mirrors series, he started work on the subject of entablatures. The Entablatures consisted of a first series of paintings from 1971 to 1972, followed by a second series in 1974–1976, and the publication of a series of relief prints in 1976. Lichtenstein produced a series of "Artists Studios" which incorporated elements of his previous work. A notable example being Artist's Studio, Look Mickey (1973, Walker Art Center, Minneapolis) which incorporates five other previous works, fitted into the scene.

During a trip to Los Angeles in 1978, Lichtenstein was fascinated by lawyer Robert Rifkind's collection of German Expressionist prints and illustrated books. He began to produce works that borrowed stylistic elements found in Expressionist paintings. The White Tree (1980) evokes lyric Der Blaue Reiter landscapes, while Dr. Waldmann (1980) recalls Otto Dix's Dr. Mayer-Hermann (1926). Small colored-pencil drawings were used as templates for woodcuts, a medium favored by Emil Nolde and Max Pechstein, as well as Dix and Ernst Ludwig Kirchner. Also in the late 1970s, Lichtenstein's style was replaced with more surreal works such as Pow Wow (1979, Ludwig Forum für Internationale Kunst, Aachen). A major series of Surrealist-Pop paintings from 1979 to 1981 is based on Native American themes. These works range from Amerind Figure (1981), a stylized life-size sculpture reminiscent of a streamlined totem pole in black-patinated bronze, to the monumental wool tapestry Amerind Landscape (1979). The "Indian" works took their themes, like the other parts of the Surrealist series, from contemporary art and other sources, including books on American Indian design from Lichtenstein's small library.

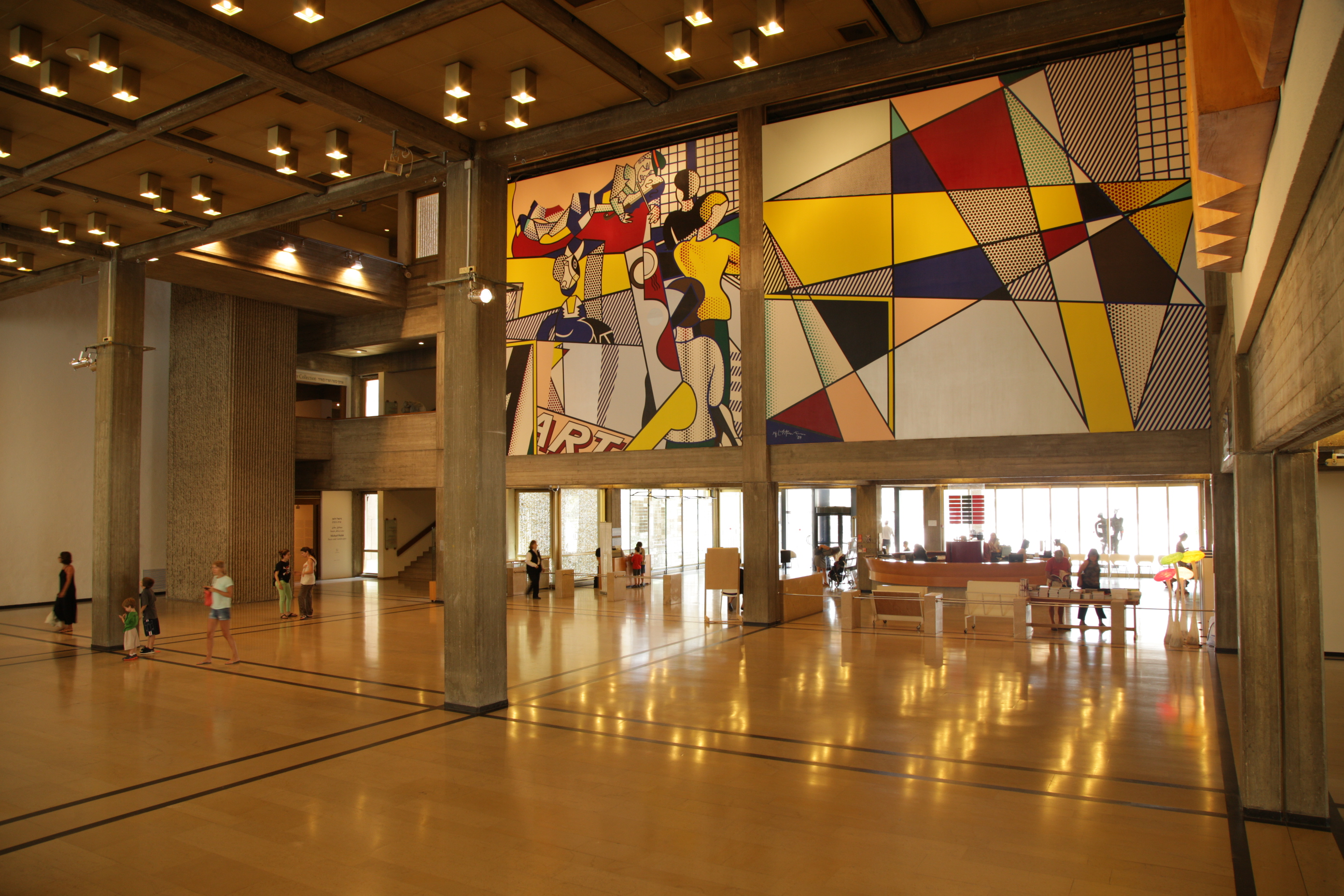
In 1989, Lichtenstein created a giant two-panel mural for the Tel Aviv Museum of Art

Lichtenstein's Still Life paintings, sculptures and drawings, which span from 1972 through the early 1980s, cover a variety of motifs and themes, including the most traditional such as fruit, flowers, and vases. In 1983 Lichtenstein made two anti-apartheid posters, simply titled "Against Apartheid". In his Reflection series, produced between 1988 and 1990, Lichtenstein reused his own motifs from previous works. Interiors (1991–1992) is a series of works depicting banal domestic environments inspired by furniture ads the artist found in telephone books or on billboards. Having garnered inspiration from the monochromatic prints of Edgar Degas featured in a 1994 exhibition at the Metropolitan Museum of Art in New York, the motifs of his Landscapes in the Chinese Style series are formed with simulated Ben-Day dots and block contours, rendered in hard, vivid color, with all traces of the hand removed. The nude is a recurring element in Lichtenstein's work of the 1990s, such as in Collage for Nude with Red Shirt (1995).

In addition to paintings and sculptures, Lichtenstein also made over 300 prints, mostly in screenprinting.

=== Commissions ===
Group 5 Racing Version of BMW 320i, painted in 1977 by Lichtenstein

In 1969, Lichtenstein was commissioned by Gunter Sachs to create Composition and Leda and the Swan, for the collector's Pop Art bedroom suite at the Palace Hotel in St. Moritz. In the late 1970s and during the 1980s, Lichtenstein received major commissions for works in public places: the sculptures Lamp (1978) in St. Mary's, Georgia; Mermaid (1979) in Miami Beach; the 26 feet tall Brushstrokes in Flight (1984, moved in 1998) at John Glenn Columbus International Airport; the five-storey high Mural with Blue Brushstroke (1984–1985) at the Equitable Center, New York; and El Cap de Barcelona (1992) in Barcelona. In 1994, Lichtenstein created the 53-foot-long, enamel-on-metal Times Square Mural in Times Square subway station. In 1977, he was commissioned by BMW to paint a Group 5 Racing Version of the BMW 320i for the third installment in the BMW Art Car Project. The DreamWorks Records logo was his last completed project. "I'm not in the business of doing anything like that (a corporate logo) and don't intend to do it again," allows Lichtenstein. "But I know Mo Ostin and David Geffen and it seemed interesting."

== Personal life, illness, and death ==
In 1949, Lichtenstein married Isabel Wilson, who previously had been married to Ohio artist Michael Sarisky. However, the brutal upstate winters took a toll on Lichtenstein and his wife, after he began teaching at the State University of New York at Oswego in 1958. The couple sold the family home in Highland Park, New Jersey, in 1963 and divorced two years later.

Lichtenstein married his second wife, Dorothy Herzka (1939–2024), in 1968. In the late 1960s, they rented a house in Southampton, New York that Larry Rivers had bought around the corner from his own house. Three years later, they bought a 1910 carriage house facing the ocean on Gin Lane. From 1970 until his death, Lichtenstein split his time between Manhattan and Southampton. Lichtenstein also had a home on Captiva Island.

In 1991, Lichtenstein began an affair with singer Erica Wexler who became the muse for his Nudes series including the 1994 "Nudes with Beach Ball". She was 22 and he was 68. The affair lasted until 1994 and was over when Wexler went to England with future husband Andy Partridge of XTC. According to Wexler, Lichtenstein and his wife Dorothy had an understanding and they both had significant others in addition to their marriage.

On September 29, 1997, Lichtenstein died at age 73 of pneumonia at New York University Medical Center, where he had been hospitalized for several weeks.

== Art works ==
=== Copyright, attribution, and scholarly perspectives ===
Although Lichtenstein's comic-based work gained some acceptance, concerns are still expressed by critics who say Lichtenstein did not credit, pay any royalties to, or seek permission from the original artists or copyright holders. In an interview for a BBC Four documentary in 2013, Alastair Sooke asked the comic book artist Dave Gibbons if he considered Lichtenstein a plagiarist. Gibbons replied: "I would say 'copycat'. In music for instance, you can't just whistle somebody else's tune or perform somebody else's tune, no matter how badly, without somehow crediting and giving payment to the original artist. That's to say, this is 'WHAAM! by Roy Lichtenstein, after Irv Novick'." Sooke himself maintains that "Lichtenstein transformed Novick's artwork in a number of subtle but crucial ways."

City University London lecturer Ernesto Priego notes that Lichtenstein's failure to credit the original creators of his comic works was a reflection on the decision by National Periodical Publications, the predecessor of DC Comics, to omit any credit for their writers and artists:

Besides embodying the cultural prejudice against comic books as vehicles of art, examples like Lichtenstein's appropriation of the vocabulary of comics highlight the importance of taking publication format in consideration when defining comics, as well as the political economy implied by specific types of historical publications, in this case the American mainstream comic book. To what extent was National Periodical Publications (later DC) responsible for the rejection of the roles of Kanigher and Novick as artists in their own right by not granting them full authorial credit on the publication itself?"

Furthermore, Campbell notes that there was a time when comic artists often declined attribution for their work.

In an account published in 1998, Novick said that he had met Lichtenstein in the army in 1947 and, as his superior officer, had responded to Lichtenstein's tearful complaints about the menial tasks he was assigned by recommending him for a better job. Jean-Paul Gabilliet has questioned this account, saying that Lichtenstein had left the army a year before the time Novick says the incident took place. Bart Beaty, noting that Lichtenstein had appropriated Novick for works such as Whaam! and Okay Hot-Shot, Okay!, says that Novick's story "seems to be an attempt to personally diminish" the more famous artist.

=== Exhibitions ===
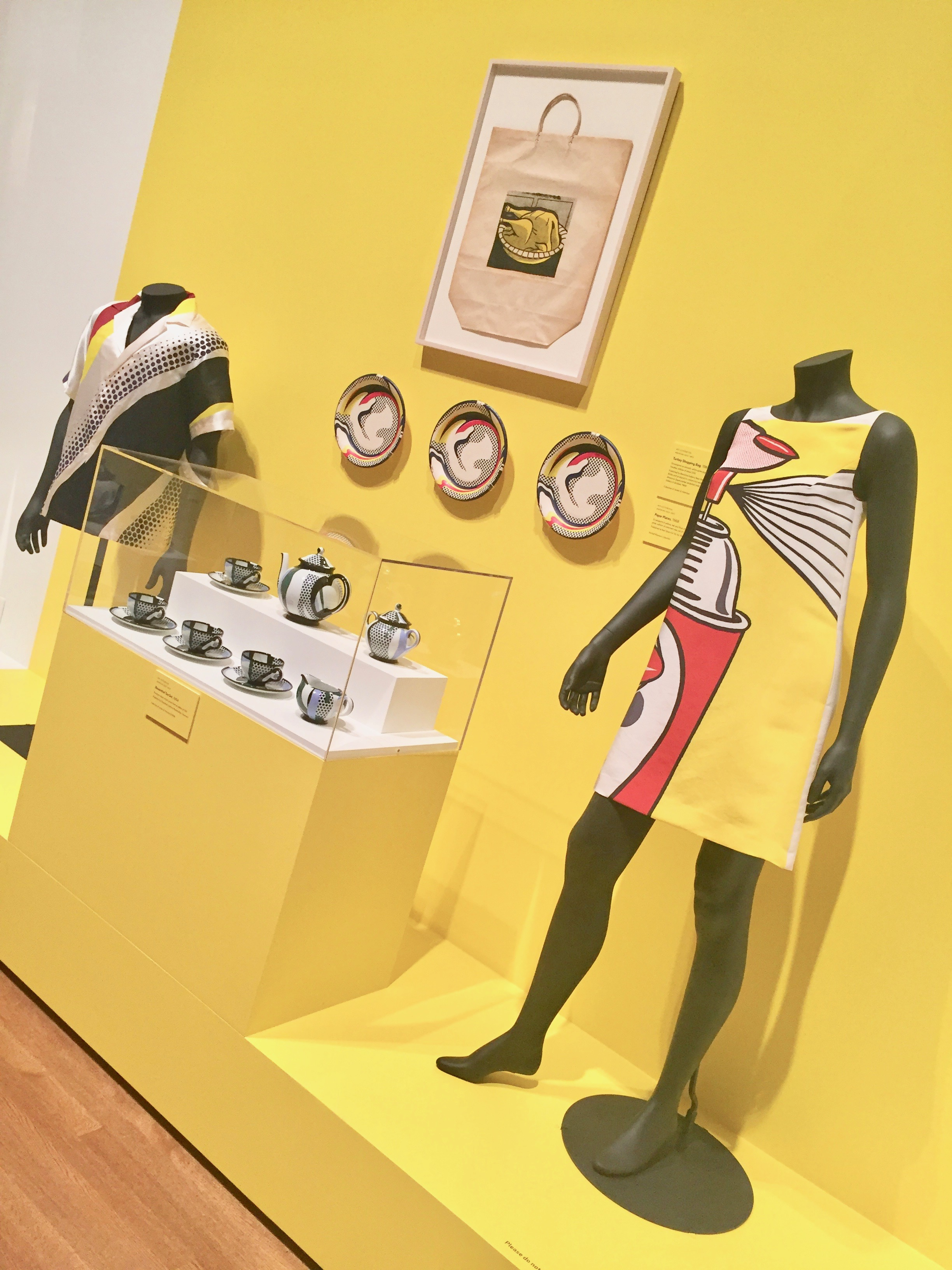
Part of the Skirball Cultural Center's Pop for the People: Roy Lichtenstein in L.A. exhibit

In 1964, Lichtenstein became the first American to exhibit at the Tate Gallery, London, on the occasion of the show "'54–'64: Painting and Sculpture of a Decade." In 1967, his first museum retrospective exhibition was held at the Pasadena Art Museum in California. The same year, Lichtenstein's first solo exhibition in Europe was held at museums in Amsterdam, London, Bern and Hannover. He later participated in documentas IV (1968) and VI in (1977).

Lichtenstein had his first retrospective at the Guggenheim Museum in 1969, organized by Diane Waldman. The Guggenheim presented a second Lichtenstein retrospective in 1994. Lichtenstein became the first living artist to have a solo drawing exhibitions at the Museum of Modern Art from March to June 1987. In 2003, the Metropolitan Museum of Art exhibited Roy Lichtenstein on the Roof, six bronze and aluminum sculptures on its roof.

More recent retrospective surveys include the 2003 "All About Art", Louisiana Museum of Modern Art, in Denmark (which traveled on to the Hayward Gallery, London, Museo Reina Sofia, Madrid, and the San Francisco Museum of Modern Art, until 2005); and "Classic of the New", Kunsthaus Bregenz (2005), "Roy Lichtenstein: Meditations on Art" Museo Triennale, Milan (2010, traveled to the Museum Ludwig, Cologne).

In 2007, the National Portrait Gallery in London mounted the major exhibition Pop Art Portraits. Lichtenstein was a featured artist, alongside contemporaries like Andy Warhol and David Hockney.

In late 2010, The Morgan Library & Museum showed Roy Lichtenstein: The Black-and-White Drawings, 1961–1968. Another major retrospective opened at the Art Institute of Chicago in May 2012 before going to the National Gallery of Art in Washington, Tate Modern in London, and the Centre Pompidou in Paris in 2013. Other exhibits include Roy Lichtenstein, Olyvia Fine Art, London in 2013, Roy Lichtenstein: Intimate Sculptures, The FLAG Art Foundation and Roy Lichtenstein: Opera Prima, Civic Gallery of Modern and Contemporary Arts, Turin, both in 2014. From October 7, 2016 through March 12, 2017, the Skirball Cultural Center in Los Angeles had on view Pop for the People: Roy Lichtenstein in L.A. 2018: Exhibition at The Tate Liverpool, Merseyside, United Kingdom.

In October 2026 the Whitney Museum of American Art in New York mounted the exhibition Like New. It was the first retrospective since 1993, and covered six decades of painting, drawing, sculpture, film, and prints. The exhibit was guest curated by Alex Da Corte who “recreat[ed] by hand two of his monumental billboards that mimic comic strip imagery and executing a painting Lichtenstein designed, but never realized.”

=== Art market ===
Since the 1950s Lichtenstein's work has been exhibited in New York and elsewhere with Leo Castelli at his gallery and at Castelli Graphics as well as with Ileana Sonnabend in her gallery in Paris, and at the Ferus Gallery, Pace Gallery, Gagosian Gallery, Mitchell-Innes & Nash, Mary Boone, Brooke Alexander Gallery, Carlebach, Rosa Esman, Marilyn Pearl, James Goodman, John Heller, Blum Helman, Hirschl & Adler, Phyllis Kind, Getler Pall, Condon Riley, 65 Thompson Street, Holly Solomon, and Sperone Westwater Galleries among others. Leo Castelli Gallery represented Lichtenstein exclusively since 1962, when a solo show by the artist sold out before it opened.

Beginning in 1962, the Leo Castelli Gallery, New York, held regular exhibitions of the artist's work. Gagosian Gallery has been exhibiting work by Lichtenstein since 1996.

Big Painting No. 6 (1965) became the highest priced Lichtenstein work in 1970. Like the entire Brushstrokes series, the subject of the painting is the process of Abstract Expressionist painting via sweeping brushstrokes and drips, but the result of Lichtenstein's simplification that uses a Ben-Day dots background is a representation of the mechanical/industrial color printing reproduction.

Lichtenstein's painting Torpedo ... Los! (1963) sold at Christie's for $5.5 million in 1989, a record sum at the time, making him one of only three living artists to have attracted such huge sums. In 2005, In the Car was sold for a then record $16.2m (£10m).

In 2010, Lichtenstein's cartoon-style 1964 painting Ohhh...Alright..., previously owned by Steve Martin and later by Steve Wynn, was sold at a record US$42.6m (£26.7m) at a sale at Christie's in New York.

Based on a 1961 William Overgard drawing for a Steve Roper cartoon story, Lichtenstein's I Can See the Whole Room...and There's Nobody in It! (1961) depicts a man looking through a hole in a door. It was sold by collector Courtney Sale Ross for $43 million, double its estimate, at Christie's in New York City in 2011; the seller's husband, Steve Ross had acquired it at auction in 1988 for $2.1 million. The painting measures four-foot by four-foot and is in graphite and oil.

The comic painting Sleeping Girl (1964) from the collection of Beatrice and Phillip Gersh established a new Lichtenstein record $44.8 million at Sotheby's in 2012.

In October 2012, Lichtenstein's painting Electric Cord (1962) was returned to Leo Castelli's widow Barbara Bertozzi Castelli, after having been missing for 42 years. Castelli had sent the painting to an art restorer for cleaning in January 1970, and never got it back. He died in 1999. In 2006, the Roy Lichtenstein Foundation published an image of the painting on its holiday greeting card and asked the art community to help find it. The painting was found in a New York warehouse, after having been displayed in Bogota, Colombia.

In 2013, the painting Woman with Flowered Hat set another record at $56.1 million as it was purchased by British jeweller Laurence Graff from American investor Ronald O. Perelman. This was topped in 2015 by the sale of Nurse for 95.4 million dollars at a Christie's auction.

In a 2016 episode of the Antiques Roadshow, a 1966 Lichtenstein screenprint was valued at $20,000.

In January 2017, Masterpiece was sold for $165 million. The proceeds of this sale will be used to create a fund for criminal justice reform.

=== Record sales ===
Roy Lichtenstein sales records
Work	Date	Price	Source
Big Painting No. 6	November 1970	$75,000	
Torpedo...Los!	November 7, 1989	$5.5M	
Kiss II	1990	$6.0M	
Happy Tears	November 2002	$7.1M	
In the Car	2005	$16.2M	
Ohhh...Alright...	November 2010	$42.6M	
I Can See the Whole Room...and There's Nobody in It!	November 2011	$43.0M	
Sleeping Girl	May 9, 2012	$44.8M	
Nude with Joyous Painting	July 9, 2020	$46.2M	
Woman with Flowered Hat	May 15, 2013	$56.1M	
Nurse	November 9, 2015	$95.4M	
Masterpiece	January 2017	$165M	

=== Collections ===
In 1996 the National Gallery of Art in Washington, D.C. became the largest single repository of the artist's work when Lichtenstein donated 154 prints and two books. The Art Institute of Chicago has several important works by Lichtenstein in its permanent collection, including Brushstroke with Spatter (1966) and Mirror No. 3 (Six Panels) (1971). The personal holdings of Lichtenstein's widow, Dorothy Lichtenstein, and of the Roy Lichtenstein Foundation number in the hundreds. In Europe, the Museum Ludwig in Cologne has one of the most comprehensive Lichtenstein holdings with Takka Takka (1962), Nurse (1964), Compositions I (1964), besides the Frankfurt Museum für Moderne Kunst with We rose up slowly (1964) and Yellow and Green Brushstrokes (1966). Outside the United States and Europe, the National Gallery of Australia's Kenneth Tyler Collection has extensive holdings of Lichtenstein's prints, numbering over 300 works. In total there are some 4,500 works thought to be in circulation.

Among many other works of art lost in the World Trade Center attacks on September 11, 2001, a painting from Lichtenstein's The Entablature Series was destroyed in the subsequent fire.

== Legacy ==
=== Accolades ===
- 1977: Skowhegan Medal for Painting, Skowhegan School, Skowhegan, Maine.
- 1979: American Academy of Arts and Letters, New York.
- 1989: American Academy in Rome, Rome, Italy. Artist in residence.
- 1991: Creative Arts Award in Painting, Brandeis University, Waltham, Massachusetts.
- 1993: Amici de Barcelona, from Mayor Pasqual Maragall, L'Alcalde de Barcelona.
- 1995: Kyoto Prize, Inamori Foundation, Kyoto, Japan.
- 1995: National Medal of the Arts, Washington D.C.

Lichtenstein received numerous Honorary Doctorate degrees from, among others, the California Institute of the Arts (1977), Southampton College (1980), Ohio State University (1987), Bard College, Royal College of Art (1993), George Washington University (1996). He also served on the board of the Brooklyn Academy of Music.

In 2023, the United States Postal Service commemorated the centennial of Lichtenstein's birth with the release of a stamp series dedicated in his honor at the Whitney Museum of American Art in New York. Five of Lichtenstein's paintings were featured on Forever stamps: Standing Explosion (Red), Modern Painting I, Still Life with Crystal Bowl, Still Life with Goldfish, and Portrait of a Woman.

=== Roy Lichtenstein Foundation ===
After the artist's death in 1997, the Roy Lichtenstein Foundation was established in 1999. In 2011, the foundation's board decided the benefits of authenticating were outweighed by the risks of protracted lawsuits.

In late 2006, the foundation sent out a holiday card featuring a picture of Electric Cord (1961), a painting that had been missing since 1970 after being sent out to art restorer Daniel Goldreyer by the Leo Castelli Gallery. The card urged the public to report any information about its whereabouts. In 2012, the foundation authenticated the piece when it surfaced at a New York City warehouse.

Between 2008 and 2012, following the death of photographer Harry Shunk in 2006, the Lichtenstein Foundation acquired the collection of photographic material shot by Shunk and his collaborator János Kender as well as the photographers' copyright. In 2013, the foundation donated the Shunk-Kender trove to five institutions – Getty Research Institute in Los Angeles; the Museum of Modern Art in New York; the National Gallery of Art in Washington; the Centre Pompidou in Paris; and the Tate in London – that will allow each museum access to the others' share.

== In popular culture ==
Lichtenstein had his portrait painted by fellow Pop artist Andy Warhol in 1967 and 1976.

Lichtenstein appears in various documentaries about Pop Art and his own work, including Roy Lichtenstein (1975) by Michael Blackwood, Reflections on a Mermaid (1994) by Theodore Bogosian for PBS, and Whaam! Blam! Roy Lichtenstein and the Art of Appropriation (2022) by James L. Hussey.
