= Double Elvis =

1963 painting by Andy Warhol

- Artist: Andy Warhol
- Year: 1963
- Medium: Silkscreen ink and silver paint on linen
- Movement: Pop Art
- Subject: Elvis Presley
- Dimensions: 210.8 cm × 134.6 cm (83.0 in × 53.0 in)
- Location: Museum of Modern Art, New York City
- Accession: 2480.2001

Double Elvis is a 1963 silkscreen painting by American artist Andy Warhol. The painting depicts two overlapping images of singer and actor Elvis Presley in a gunslinger pose, derived from a publicity still for the 1960 film Flaming Star.

Part of Warhol's Elvis series, the painting incorporates recurring themes in his work, including Hollywood celebrity, camp, and commercial imagery. It was first exhibited at the Ferus Gallery in Los Angeles in 1963. Warhol gave Double Elvis to singer Bob Dylan, who later traded it to his manager, Albert Grossman, for a sofa. The painting is now part of the Museum of Modern Art collection in New York City.

== Background ==
In 1962, Andy Warhol emerged as a leading figure in the Pop art movement, producing paintings based on everyday consumer products and popular culture. In July of that year, his first solo exhibition was held at the Ferus Gallery in Los Angeles, where he debuted his Campbell's Soup Cans series. Shortly after, Warhol expanded his subject matter to include celebrities since he had a fascination with Hollywood cinema since he was a child.

Warhol held his first New York solo exhibition at the Stable Gallery in November 1962. The exhibition included some Do-It-Yourself paint-by-numbers paintings, Flavor Marilyns, Gold Marilyn Monroe, Red Elvis, Troy Donahue, 129 Die in Jet!, and 100 Coke Bottles.

For his second exhibition at the Ferus Gallery in September 1963, Warhol presented paintings of actress Elizabeth Taylor and singer Elvis Presley based on publicity photographs of the two Hollywood stars.

== Production and technique ==
La Consentida and Elvis Presley on the set of Flaming Star (1960)

In January 1963, Warhol began renting a two-story firehouse on East 87th Street, near his Lexington Avenue townhouse. He used the space as his studio where he produced Double Elvis.

The painting is based on a publicity still of Elvis Presley from the film Flaming Star (1960). The photograph depicts Presley dressed as a cowboy, holding a gun. Warhol had the image enlarged into a silkscreen and printed in black ink onto a canvas he had covered with metallic silver paint. Working with his assistant Gerard Malanga, Warhol transferred the image of Presley onto the canvases using the silkscreen process. They printed the image once, twice, or multiple times, sometimes with the impressions slightly overlapping.

Double Elvis was among several Elvis paintings Warhol made for his show at the Ferus Gallery in Los Angeles. Rather than sending the individual paintings to Los Angeles, Warhol shipped a roll of canvas bearing images of Presley, with instructions to cut it into sections and stretch them onto individual frames.

== Description ==
Measuring approximately 83 × 53 in (210.8 × 134.6 cm), the painting features two overlapping images of Presley, cropped at the hair and feet, holding a gun against a silver background. The repetition creates a stroboscopic effect that evokes movement similar in appearance to successive frames in a film strip. It also evokes a double exposure.

== Exhibition ==
Double Elvis was first exhibited at the Ferus Gallery in Los Angeles from September to October 1963, in Warhol's second exhibition at the gallery. For the exhibition, Warhol mailed gallery director Irving Blum a continuous roll of canvas printed with repeated images of Presley, along with stretcher bars of various sizes. He instructed Blum to cut the canvas into sections and stretch them according to the gallery's preference.

Warhol initially told Blum that he would be unable to attend the opening. However, he traveled to Los Angeles by car from New York with Gerard Malanga, Wynn Chamberlain, and Taylor Mead, arriving in time for the opening. Warhol later recalled: "The farther West we drove, the more Pop everything looked on the highways. Suddenly we all felt like insiders because even though Pop was everywhere . . . to us, it was the new Art."

None of the paintings in the exhibition sold, including ten new portraits of actress Elizabeth Taylor. The largest work, a 37-foot-long canvas depicting Presley sixteen times, was offered for sale at $3,500.

== Critical reception ==
Art critic Henry J. Seldis of the Los Angeles Times wrote that the Ferus Gallery was "filled better-than-life-size images of Elvis Presley as a gun toting westerner. Imposed on silver screen backgrounds through stencil and photo processes, the Presley image, single or multiple, separate of 'double and triple exposed', provides sufficient works of non-art to fill the gallery." He concluded, "Since questions of aesthetic quality have been declared irrelevant by pop art impresarios, Warhol may well be playing it safe in providing quantity."

== Variations ==
Warhol's Elvis paintings are among his best-known works. Produced between 1963 and 1964, the paintings depict Presley in various arrangements, including single, double and triple repetitions of the same publicity photograph. The largest work is 37 feet long and features sixteen images of Presley.

One of the series' distinctive works is the diptych Elvis I and II, which features two pairs of side-by-side portraits of Presley, one against a silver background and the other against a hand-colored ground.

Works from the series are held in museum and private collections internationally. These include Triple Elvis (1963) at the Virginia Museum of Fine Arts; Elvis (1964) at the National Gallery of Australia; Single Elvis (1964) at Museum Ludwig; Elvis 2 Times (1963) at the Whitney Museum of American Art; Elvis (1963) at the Fukuoka Art Museum; Elvis (Eleven Times) (1963) at the Andy Warhol Museum; Triple Elvis [Ferus Type] (1963) at the San Francisco Museum of Modern Art; and Elvis I and II (1963–64) at the Art Gallery of Ontario.

In November 2014, Triple Elvis [Ferus Type] sold for $81.9 million at Christie's in New York.

In November 2019, Double Elvis [Ferus Type] sold for $53.4 million at Christie's in New York.

== Provenance ==
Warhol gave the painting to folk singer Bob Dylan after he sat for a Screen Test at the Factory in 1966. According to photographer Nat Finkelstein, who documented the meeting, Warhol intended to give Dylan the painting. Factory associate Billy Name recalled that Warhol had hoped the gift would lead to an ongoing relationship, possibly involving work on Dylan's album covers.

In his memoir POPism: The Warhol '60s (1980), Warhol said that he heard rumors that Dylan had used the painting as a dartboard. In the 1970s, Warhol eventually learned that Dylan had given the painting to his manager, Albert Grossman. At a party in London, Dylan admitted to Warhol that he gave it away and expressed regret, saying, "But if you ever gave me another one, Andy, I wouldn't make that mistake again..." Warhol was later informed by guitarist Robbie Robertson that Dylan had actually traded the painting to Grossman for a sofa. In a 1985 interview with Spin, Dylan confirmed the exchange, describing it as "a stupid thing to do."

Following Grossman's death, his widow, Sally Grossman, sold the painting at auction for $750,000. It was purchased by Long Island real estate developer Jerry Spiegel, who donated it to the Museum of Modern Art.

== Collection ==
In 2001, the painting entered the permanent collection of the Museum of Modern Art in New York City as a gift from the Jerry and Emily Spiegel Family Foundation in honor of Kirk Varnedoe.
