= Marilyn Monroe (Warhol) =

1967 prints by Andy Warhol

- Artist: Andy Warhol
- Year: 1967
- Medium: Screenprint in colors on paper, in ten parts
- Movement: Pop Art
- Subject: Marilyn Monroe
- Dimensions: 91 cm × 91 cm (36 in × 36 in)

Marilyn Monroe, also known as Marilyn, is a 1967 portfolio of ten silkscreen prints by American artist Andy Warhol, depicting actress Marilyn Monroe. Published by Factory Additions, the portfolio is based on a publicity photograph from the 1953 film Niagara taken by Gene Kornman. Each print reproduces the same image of Monroe in different combinations of vivid, highly saturated colors characteristic of Warhol's Pop art style.

Created five years after Monroe's death, the portfolio formed part of Warhol's long-running exploration of celebrity, repetition, and consumer culture. It was one of several series devoted to Monroe, following earlier works such as Gold Marilyn Monroe (1962), Marilyn Diptych (1962), and the Shot Marilyns (1964). The portfolio has become one of Warhol's most recognizable print series. Whilst the portfolio is viewed as one entity, each individual print may either be called Untitled from Marilyn Monroe.

== Background ==
In the 1950s, Andy Warhol established himself as a successful commercial illustrator in New York City, producing advertisements for I. Miller shoes and illustrations for magazines including Glamour, The New York Times, Vogue, and Harper's Bazaar.

In the early 1960s, Warhol transitioned from commercial illustration to Pop art, creating works based on everyday consumer products such as Campbell's Soup cans and Coca-Cola bottles. In 1962, he began experimenting with the silkscreen painting, replacing the more handmade rubber-stamp techniques he had previously used. The method allowed him to reproduce photographic images repeatedly while retaining slight variations between impressions.

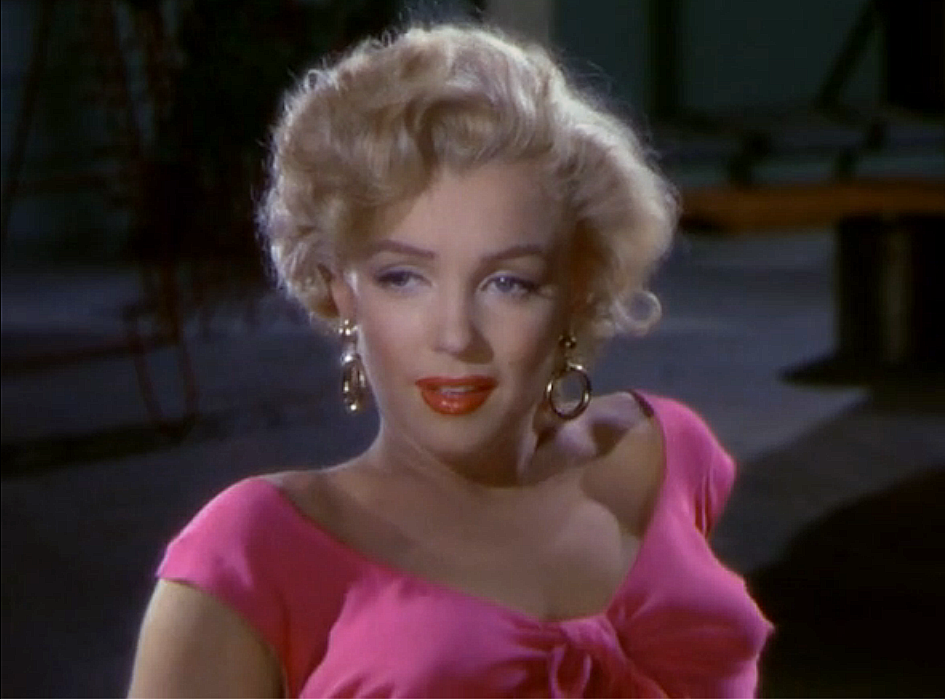
Monroe in the 1953 film Niagara

Marilyn Monroe, born Norma Jeane Mortenson, rose to fame in the 1950s after signing a contract with Twentieth Century-Fox. She became one of Hollywood’s most recognizable actresses, appearing in films such as The Asphalt Jungle (1950), All About Eve (1950), and The Seven Year Itch (1955). A publicity still photographed by Gene Kornman for the film Niagara (1953) later became the source image for many of Warhol's Marilyn works. Despite her celebrity status, Monroe often struggled against Hollywood's typecasting of her as a "dumb blonde" stereotype. She died from a barbiturate overdose on August 4, 1962, at the age of 36.

Following Monroe's death, Warhol repeatedly returned to her image as a subject throughout the 1960s. His earliest works included Gold Marilyn Monroe (1962), the Flavor Marilyns (1962) Marilyn Diptych (1962), and Marilyn x 100 (1962). In 1964, he produced a group of painted Marilyn canvases that later became known as the Shot Marilyns after performance artist Dorothy Podber fired a revolver through a stack of the works at Warhol's Factory studio.

The impact of Warhol pioneering the Pop art movement was in his ability to break down the separation between high-class art such as historic and expressionist, and low-class art, such as commercial and the more mundane. Warhol continued revisiting Monroe's image in later series, including Reversals and Retrospectives, but his final major treatment of the actress came in 1967 with the Marilyn Monroe portfolio, a set of ten screenprints distinguished by their vivid, Technicolor-inspired palette.

== Production ==
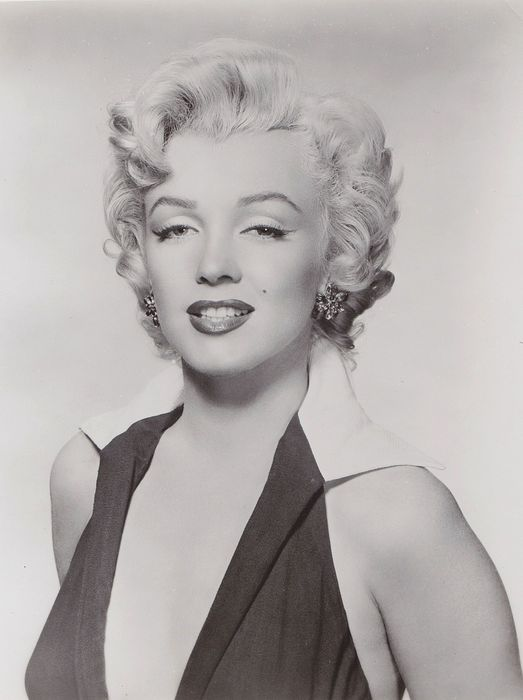
The 1953 publicity photo of Monroe that Warhol used for the series

Warhol's style evolved over his career, becoming bolder and more graphic. In 1962, he adopted what would become his trademark, the screen printing technique that defined his works. Recalling this shift in his memoirPOPism: the Warhol '60s (1980), Warhol recalled: "In August '62 I started doing silkscreens. The rubber-stamp method I'd been using to repeat images suddenly seemed too homemade; I wanted something stronger that gave more of an assembly-line effect."

The mechanical repetition of images appealed to Warhol as an extension of mass production and commercial printing. His silkscreen process involved transferring photographic images onto mesh screens and layering individual colors one at a time using separate frames and a squeegee. For the prints in Untitled from Marilyn Monroe, Warhol used five different screens for each image.

Published under the imprint Factory Additions, Warhol's print portfolios adapted imagery from some of his best-known paintings into more widely distributed editions. These included Marilyn Monroe, Campbell's Soup I, Campbell's Soup II, Flowers, and Electric Chairs. For the 1967 Marilyn Monroe portfolio, production of the ten screenprints was overseen by David Whitney, who selected many of the color combinations and submitted them to Warhol for approval. Warhol himself was reportedly absent during much of the proofing process. The portfolio of ten was printed in an edition of 250, some signed by Warhol.

== Description ==
The resulting ten 36 × 36 inch prints were among his most technically ambitious works to date, with an array of colors such as fiery reds, vivid pinks, and other saturated hues. The use of complementary and high-contrast colors became a hallmark of Warhol's work and contributed to the visual language of 1960s consumer culture. Though the composition remained constant across the portfolio, each variation conveyed a distinct emotional tone through color alone.

== Interpretation ==
The Marilyn Monroe portfolio has been interpreted as a deconstruction of the film star's manufactured public image and media typecasting. Warhol transformed Monroe's established image as a sex symbol and femme fatale into a series of silkscreen prints, repeating and modifying her likeness across the portfolio. The simplified features, heavy outlines, and vivid colors emphasize Monroe's distinctive facial features and hairstyle while turning her image into a reproducible commercial-like icon. The repetition has also been interpreted in relation to mass production and the cyclical nature of popular culture.

Warhol cropped the source photograph tightly around Monroe's face, emphasizing her recognizable features and bringing the image closer to the viewer. The differences among the ten prints, including variations caused by smudging, blurring, and other imperfections in the silkscreen process, have been interpreted as emphasizing the distance between Monroe's public image and her private identity. These variations have also been understood as a commentary on the rise of mass production and consumer culture in the 1960s.

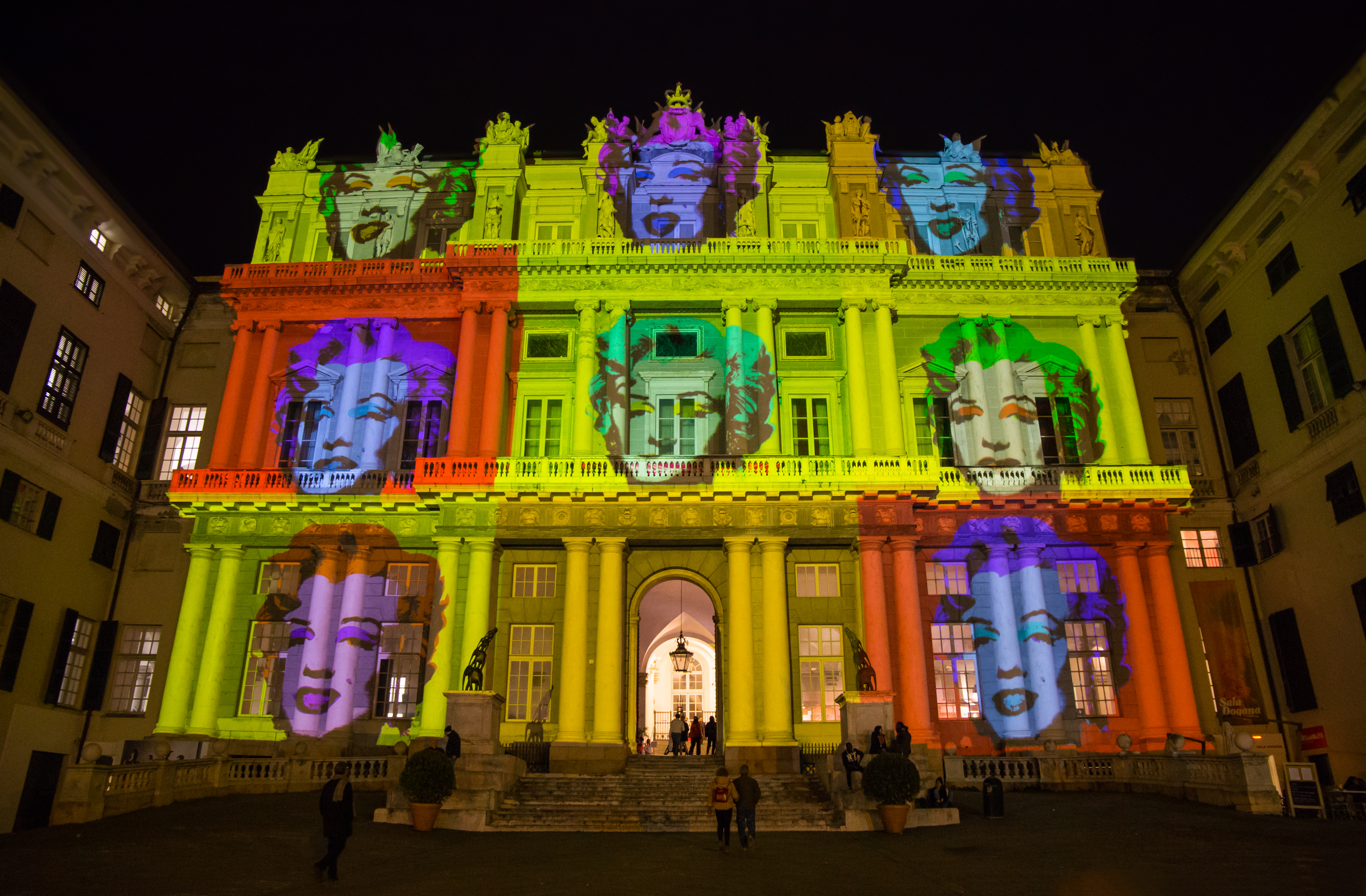
A light display featuring Warhol's Marilyn Monroe prints at Palazzo Ducale in Genoa, 2016

The portfolio has further been interpreted in relation to the media's treatment of Monroe's private life. Rather than depicting her personal life, Warhol focused on the public image through which she was known, using a reproductive process closely associated with commercial and print media. Monroe herself expressed a desire to preserve aspects of her private life, saying, "I don't want everybody to see exactly where I live, what my sofa or fireplace looks like... I want to stay just in the fantasy of Everyman."

Warhol's choice of Monroe as a subject shortly after her death in 1962 has also been connected to his broader interest in celebrity, death, and images drawn from mass media. Her death was widely regarded as an American tragedy, adding a dimension of mortality to an image otherwise associated with glamour and celebrity.

== Exhibitions ==
Warhol often created works specifically for exhibitions. He included 20 Marilyn prints for his survey at Stockholm's Moderna Museet, which opened in February 1968.

== Collections ==
Individual prints from the Marilyn Monroe portfolio are held in the collections of institutions including the Whitney Museum of American Art in New York City, the Philadelphia Museum of Art in Philadelphia, and the Art Institute of Chicago in Chicago. Complete sets of the portfolio are owned by the Museum of Modern Art and the Metropolitan Museum of Art in New York City as well as the Tate in London.

== Art market ==
The endurance of the works and the growth in price is attributed to the fact that Warhol's art is still relevant and reflective of today's glamour and the consumer culture.

The Marilyn Monroe set was originally priced at $500, but many of the sets were broken up so the prints could be sold individually. Whilst the original silkscreen paintings made by hand are worth millions, the prints are also sold for a much lower price. Individual prints from the set have sold for up to $515,300 at auction. In 2022, a set sold for $5 million at Christie's in New York.

== Sunday B. Morning editions ==
In 1970, Andy Warhol reportedly collaborated with two anonymous associates in Belgium to produce a new series of screenprints based on the same imagery and colour codes used for the original 1967 Marilyn Monroe portfolio. The resulting prints, published under the name Sunday B. Morning, were produced from screens based on the original Factory Additions screens and issued in an edition of 250. Each print is stamped on the verso in black ink with "Published by Sunday B. Morning" and "Fill in your own signature".

The collaboration between Warhol and his Belgian associates reportedly broke down before the prints were released, and Sunday B. Morning continued production independently using the negatives and colour codes it had already obtained. Warhol was reportedly displeased by the release and attempted to halt production, but was unable to do so; he is said to have occasionally signed examples he encountered with the phrase "This is not by me." The 1970 black-stamp prints are nonetheless listed in the Feldman and Schellmann catalogue raisonné of Warhol's prints.

A third series, known as the "European Artist's Proof Edition", was released in 1985 using the same image, bearing a stamped signature of Warhol on the verso in place of the black stamps; the number of copies produced is not documented. Sunday B. Morning has continued to produce screenprints from the original screens, with current editions distinguished by a blue ink stamp on the verso rather than the black stamp used on the 1970 prints.
