= Miller Company Collection of Abstract Art =

Private collection of modern art

The Miller Company Collection of Abstract Art (1945 – c. 1955) was formed in Meriden, Connecticut as part of the Miller Company. The collection was formed by then CEO Burton Tremaine Sr. and his wife, Miller Co. art director Emily Hall Tremaine in 1945. Works from the collection were featured in the Painting Toward Architecture exhibition, putting forth post-WWII art, design and architecture crossovers, originating at the Wadsworth Atheneum in Hartford, CT, and traveling to 28 additional venues in 1947–1952 across the United States.

The company was part of the wave of developing corporate art collections at that time. The Tremaines' concept was to refer to circa 1920s European art and design crossovers, and apply those general principles to post-WWII America and recent technological developments in their fluorescent lighting. They encouraged architects and designers to adopt these principles to develop new interior design forms to incorporate Miller Co. lighting into commercial interiors.

== Painting toward architecture exhibition (1947–1952) ==
The exhibition featured and referred to leading Modernists in European and American art and architecture with a connection to then-Miller Company lighting designs. Artworks exhibited included works by Josef Albers, Leo Amino, Jean Arp / Hans Arp, Harry Bertoia, Ilya Bolotowsky, Georges Braque, Alexander Calder, Mary Callery, Stuart Davis, Max Ernst, Lyonel Feininger, Perle Fine, Juan Gris, James Guy, Jean Hélion, Charles-Edouard Jeanneret, Wassily Kandinsky, Kunisada, Paul Klee, Fernand Léger, Jacques Lipchitz, John Marin, Roberto Matta, Carlos Mérida, Joan Miró, Piet Mondrian, Henry Moore, László Moholy-Nagy, Ben Nicholson, Georgia O'Keeffe, I. Rice Pereira, Pablo Picasso, Jose de Rivera, Kurt Schwitters, Charles Sheeler, Rufino Tamayo, Mark Tobey, John Tunnard and Theo van Doesburg.

Photographs of Modern architectural designs accompanied the artworks starting in December 1948 and included work by Le Corbusier, Walter Gropius (Bauhaus), Oscar Niemeyer, and Frank Lloyd Wright. Also, as part of the overall Painting toward architecture initiative, Oscar Niemeyer was commissioned to make a design with Roberto Burle Marx for the unbuilt Tremaine House. In the exhibition, Roberto Burle Marx's Design for a garden was exhibited.

A self-published exhibition catalogue, Painting toward architecture, was released in November 1948. The catalogue essay was written by Henry-Russell Hitchcock and Bradbury Thompson designed the catalogue.

The travelling exhibition received national media coverage and deepened a discussion on Modern art and architecture in the United States.

Apart from Painting toward architecture, there were other Miller Company art shows at Wesleyan University (1945), Cornell University (1951), Smith College (1951–1952), and Trinity College in Hartford (1958). Throughout this time period, artworks were loaned to many other exhibitions at various museums.

== Special exhibition at Museum of Modern Art, New York ==
From February to April 1949, during the Painting toward architecture (1947–1952) exhibition run, the Museum of Modern Art exhibited From Le Corbusier to Niemeyer: Savoye House - Tremaine House 1949. According to the museum, "The theme of this show is based on Henry Russell-Hitchcock's book on the Miller [Company] Collection of abstract art, Painting toward architecture..." Documentation showing Le Corbusier's iconic Villa Savoye was juxtaposed with Oscar Niemeyer's maquette of an integrated Design for a garden gouache-work (1948) for the unbuilt Tremaine house. In 2010, Berry Bergdoll, a curator at MoMA asserted the importance of the exhibition as fusing strands of the geometric and organic soon after WWII.

== Modernist design at the Miller Company ==
During this time, as part of a wider Modernist agenda, Miller Co. activities included Philip Johnson closely consulting on product design for the company for at least a three-year period

Josef Albers, formerly at the internationally influential Bauhaus in Germany, was hired to work on the corporate logo; and Serge Chermayeff, president of the "New Bauhaus", the School of Design in Chicago, to contributed graphic design and interior design concepts utilizing Miller Co. lighting.

== Tremaine Collection ==
By the mid-1950s, the growing art collection activity morphed away from the Miller Co. to the private Tremaine Collection and the Tremaine's art and design decision-making activities took place in Meriden, Madison, Connecticut, New York City, and beyond. In actuality, many artworks marketed as from the Miller Co. were privately owned by the Tremaines and lent for the corporate initiative.

Over the years, the Tremaines collected hundreds of artworks and exhibition many in hundreds of national and international exhibitions. Works purchased early on in artists' careers include Three Flags by Jasper Johns (1958), now at the Whitney Museum of American Art, New York, Marilyn Diptych by Andy Warhol (1962) (of which Emily Hall Tremaine is credited as a collaborator), now at Tate Modern in London, and Roy Lichtenstein's I Can See the Whole Room...and There's Nobody in It!. In the late 1960s, the Tremaines offered land that they partly owned on their Arizona ranch to Walter de Maria to test his now-iconic The Lightning Field, a 1-mile x 1 km earthwork designed to attract lightning into an art performance with metal poles, before its relocation to New Mexico.

In 1984, the Tremaine Collection was exhibited at the Wadsworth Atheneum in Hartford, CT. Over 150 artworks were exhibited.

"By the early 1980s the Tremaine collection had grown to more than 400 works by European and American artists", reported the New York Times, and it was "considered by museum directors, dealers and art writers to be one of the greatest private collections of 20th century art in the world", reported the Hartford Courant. The collection was estimated to be worth $84 million in 1987 (equivalent to $238 million in 2025).

In 1988, many artworks in the Tremaine collection were sold at auction at Christie's in New York. The total amount of sold artworks was $25.8 million. Jasper Johns's White flag sold for $7 million, the highest price paid for an artwork by a living artist at that time. In 1991, 50 additional artworks were sold at Christie's New York.
