= Flavor Marilyns =

1962 series of paintings by Andy Warhol

- Top row: Mint Marilyn, Cherry Marilyn, Green Marilyn; Middle row: Liquorice Marilyn, Lemon Marilyn, Blue Marilyn; Bottom row: Orange Marilyn, Lavender Marilyn, Grape Marilyn
- Artist: Andy Warhol
- Year: 1962
- Medium: Synthetic polymer and silkscreen inks on canvas
- Movement: Pop Art
- Subject: Marilyn Monroe
- Dimensions: 50 cm × 40.6 cm (20 in × 16.0 in)

The Flavor Marilyns, also known as the Single Marilyns, are a series of twelve silkscreen paintings created in 1962 by American artist Andy Warhol depicting actress Marilyn Monroe. The works were among Warhol's earliest portraits of Monroe and were produced shortly after her death in August 1962. Each painting uses the same publicity photograph from the 1953 film Niagara with a differently colored background, giving rise to titles such as Cherry Marilyn, Orange Marilyn, Lemon Marilyn, and Mint Marilyn. The series is considered the first major group within Warhol's extensive body of Marilyn works and helped establish the artist as a leading figure of the emerging Pop art movement.

== Background ==
Since his childhood, Pop artist Andy Warhol was captivated by Hollywood, fame, and movie stars. Raised in a working-class household in Pittsburgh, he immersed himself in fan magazines and built a collection of autographs from film celebrities, finding an escape from everyday life through fan magazines. By the late 1950s, he had established himself as a successful commercial illustrator in New York City, producing advertisements and illustrations for I. Miller shoes and major magazines such as Glamour, Vogue, and Harper's Bazaar.

In 1961, Warhol began transitioning from commercial art to Pop art, creating paintings based on consumer products and popular culture imagery. In August 1962, he adopted the silkscreen process, which allowed him to reproduce photographic images repeatedly while retaining slight variations between impressions. The death of Marilyn Monroe on August 4, 1962, provided the catalyst for Warhol's first Marilyn works. Newspaper reports of her death appeared on August 6, Warhol's 34th birthday, and he was struck by the extensive media coverage surrounding the event.

Monroe rose to fame after signing with Twentieth Century-Fox in 1946 and became one of Hollywood's most recognizable stars during the 1950s. Following breakthrough performances in The Asphalt Jungle (1950) and All About Eve (1950), she achieved international fame through films including Niagara (1953), Gentlemen Prefer Blondes (1953), How to Marry a Millionaire (1953), The Seven Year Itch (1955), Bus Stop (1956), and Some Like It Hot (1959). Despite her commercial success, Monroe struggled with being typecast as a "dumb blonde" and personal difficulties, becoming a symbol of the contrast between public glamour and private tragedy.

A few days after Monroe's death, Warhol's friend Ed Plunkett accompanied him to Serendipity, where one of the restaurant's owners asked, "Oh, Andy, will you do a book for us on Marilyn?" Plunkett assumed he meant one of Warhol's self-published illustrated books, such as 25 Cats Name Sam and One Blue Pussy (1957) or Wild Raspberries (1959), both of which were sold at the restaurant. Warhol reportedly replied, "Well, okay." The seemingly casual exchange helped spark what would become one of the most significant subjects of his career.

== Production ==
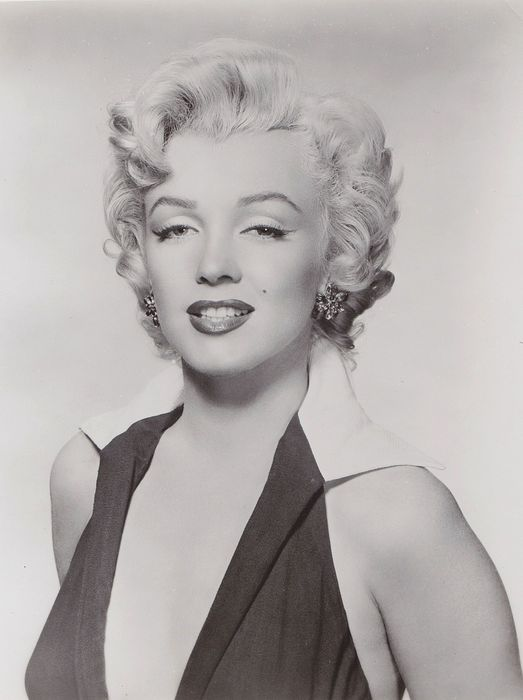
The original publicity photo of Monroe used for Warhol's series

The Flavor Marilyns were created during the first months of Warhol's experimentation with silkscreen printing. Using a publicity photograph taken by Gene Kornman to promote the 1953 film Niagara, Warhol enlarged and transferred Monroe's image onto silk screens, which he then printed over hand-painted backgrounds. The works followed earlier silkscreen portraits of actors Troy Donahue and Warren Beatty, but Monroe quickly became Warhol's preferred subject. Warhol later recalled in his book POPism: the Warhol '60s (1980):

In August '62 I started doing silkscreens. The rubber-stamp method I'd been using to repeat images suddenly seemed too homemade; I wanted something stronger that gave more of an assembly-line effect.
With silkscreening, you pick a photograph, blow it up, transfer it in glue onto silk, and then roll ink across it so the ink goes through the silk but not through the glue. That way you get the same image, slightly different each time. It was all so simple—quick and chancy. I was thrilled with it. My first experiments with screens were heads of Troy Donahue and Warren Beatty, and then when Marilyn Monroe happened to die that month, I got the idea to make screens of her beautiful face—the first Marilyns.

The series consists of twelve 20 × 16-inch paintings, each featuring the same portrait of Monroe against a differently colored background, such as Cherry Marilyn, Green Marilyn, Mint Marilyn, Lemon Marilyn, Blue Marilyn, Liquorice Marilyn, Peach Marilyn, and Grape Marilyn. Because the titles correspond to colors, scholars and collectors later adopted the term "Flavor Marilyns," referring both to the paintings' vibrant hues and to flavors of Life Savers candy.

The works were among the earliest examples of Warhol's use of repeated celebrity imagery. They laid the foundation for later Marilyn series, including the Shot Marilyns (1964) and the Marilyn Monroe print portfolio (1967).

== Exhibition ==
Eight paintings from the Flavor Marilyns series were exhibited in Warhol's first New York solo exhibition at the Stable Gallery in November 1962. The exhibition also included works such as his large Campbell's Soup Can paintings, 100 Coke Bottles, Red Elvis, and Gold Marilyn Monroe.

== Critical reception ==
Reviewing the Stable Gallery show for ARTnews, art critic G. R. Swenson observed: "He paints a can of Campbell's soup with such complete innocence and simplicity that it was tempting to find as much humanity and mystery in it as there is in good abstract paintings. But, unlike the other 'New Realists' with whom he is sometimes linked, he makes no attempt to bare his soul; he is quite ingenuously interested in his subject matter. If he paints Marilyn Monroe 20 times, it is because that is the way she seems to him, 20 times different and yet always as if from a movie magazine. He never uses satire. He simply likes the people he paints."

Michael Fried of Art International was particularly drawn to Warhol's Marilyns: "I admit, to register an advance protest against the advent of a generation that will not be as moved by Warhol's beautiful, vulgar, heart-breaking icons of Marilyn Monroe as I am. These, I think, are the most successful pieces in the show."

== Interpretation ==
In the book Pop Art (1965), writer John Rublowsky reflected on Warhol's depiction of Marilyn after encountering Grape Marilyn during a visit to Warhol's studio. The work prompted him to consider the divide between Monroe's public image and private identity. He described the actress as being "garbed in the mask of the goddess. As goddess, she is bigger than life. She is a star who exists on Olympian heights. Yet behind the mask is a woman, and the woman was vulnerable." Rublowsky argued that the portrait was a reflection of Monroe's transformation from a person into a commercial commodity:

The portrait of Marilyn Monroe tells the story of a human being transformed, of a woman changed into a commercial property. She has been carefully manufactured, packaged, and sold like a can of soup. Her painted mask is reproduced endlessly until it is no longer possible to say where the mask ends and the woman begins. Illusion and reality become confused. The tragic transformation is complete. A novelist might tell her story in a hundred-thousand words; a playwright, in three hours behind the proscenium arch. Andy Warhol has told it in a small painting, a silk-screened image daubed with garish colors.

Rublowsky also connected the painting to Warhol's own public persona: "Andy Warhol is a complex man who defies classification. Like the portrait of Marilyn Monroe, he, too, wears a mask-a contrived image that serves as a buffer between him and the world. He, too, is a web of contradictions without obvious resolution."

Ann Temkin, chief curator of painting and sculpture at the Museum of Modern Art in New York, contrasted the precisely contained colors of Warhol's Do It Yourself paintings with the misaligned and unevenly applied colors of his silkscreened portraits. In the Flavor Marilyns, she argued, color functioned as "an independent agent," contributing to the paintings' individuality through the relationship between the printed colors and Monroe's outlined features. Drawing on Roland Barthes's characterization of Pop art's color as "chemical," Temkin wrote "Warhol's color in the Marilyns was every bit as artificial as the flavorings might be in the treats that the cherry, lemon, and mint of the titles suggested." She further related the paintings' artificial colors to Monroe's makeup and dyed hair, observing that "Warhol in effect squared the concept: artificial color was used to depict artificial color."

== Collections ==
Green Marilyn is owned by the National Gallery of Art in Washington, D.C.

Blue Marilyn is in the collection of Princeton University in Princeton, New Jersey.

Mint Marilyn is in the collection of the artist Jasper Johns.

Liquorice Marilyn is owned by the Brant Foundation in Greenwich, Connecticut.

Cherry Marilyn is in the collection of Kunstmuseum Liechtenstein in Vaduz, Liechtenstein.

Lavender Marilyn is in the collection of Uli Knecht.

== Art market ==
The Flavor Marilyns initially sold for $225 each in 1962.

In July 1998, real estate developer Steve Wynn purchased Orange Marilyn for $3 million from Condé Nast Chairman S.I. Newhouse Jr.

In May 2001, Orange Marilyn sold for $3.7 million at Christie's in New York. In November 2006, it was sold again at Christie's in New York for $16.2 million.

In May 2007, Lemon Marilyn sold for $28 million at Christie's in New York.

In May 2014, White Marilyn sold for $41 million at Christie's in New York.
