= Triple Elvis =

1963 painting by Andy Warhol

Triple Elvis [Ferus Type]
- Artist: Andy Warhol
- Year: 1963
- Medium: Silkscreen ink and silver paint on linen
- Movement: Pop Art
- Subject: Elvis Presley
- Dimensions: 208.3 cm × 175.3 cm (82.0 in × 69.0 in)
- Location: Private collection

Triple Elvis [Ferus Type] is a 1963 painting by American artist Andy Warhol. The work depicts three images of singer and actor Elvis Presley derived from a publicity still for the 1960 Western film Flaming Star. Created early in Warhol's Pop art career, Triple Elvis is part of a broader Elvis series of paintings that explore celebrity, repetition, and mechanical reproduction. In 2014, the painting sold for $81.9 million at Christie's, ranking it among the most expensive paintings ever sold.

== Production and technique ==
Andy Warhol produced the Elvis series in 1963, drawing on a publicity photograph of Elvis Presley dressed as a gunslinger, sourced from promotional material for Flaming Star (1960). The image was transferred to canvas using the silkscreen technique, reflecting Warhol's increasing interest in mechanical reproduction. In Triple Elvis, the figure appears three times in overlapping succession, a strategy that suggests motion while simultaneously flattening the image through repetition.

== Description ==
Measuring approximately 82 × 69 in (208.3 × 175.3 cm), the painting is executed in silkscreen ink on canvas. It presents Presley in a frontal pose holding a revolver, with the serial impressions creating a cinematic effect. Its largely monochromatic palette and the silkscreen ink is often left partially unprimed.

== Variations ==
Warhol's Elvis series is among his most celebrated bodies. Several paintings are held in major museum and private collections worldwide. These include the Virginia Museum of Fine Arts (Triple Elvis, 1963), Museum of Modern Art (Double Elvis, 1963), the National Gallery of Australia (Elvis, 1964), Museum Ludwig (Single Elvis, 1964), the Whitney Museum of American Art (Elvis 2 Times, 1963), the Fukuoka Art Museum (Elvis, 1963), the Andy Warhol Museum (Elvis [Eleven Times], 1963), and the San Francisco Museum of Modern Art (Triple Elvis, 1963).

Double Elvis [Ferus Type] sold for $54.7 million at Christie's in 2019.

== Exhibitions ==
Triple Elvis was first shown from September to October 1963 at Warhol's exhibition at the Ferus Gallery in Los Angeles. The exhibition, which featured multiple Elvis works installed side by side, marked a pivotal moment in Warhol's career and helped establish his reputation on the West Coast. The paintings were originally sold for prices ranging from $300 to $500.

The work was included in Andy Warhol: Portraits, shown at the Seattle Art Museum in Seattle, Washington and the Denver Art Museum in Denver, Colorado from November 1976 to January 1977. It was subsequently displayed at Spielbank Aachen in Aachen, Germany from December 1977 to March 2009, and later featured in the exhibition Le grand monde d'Andy Warhol at the Galeries nationales du Grand Palais in Paris from March to July 2009.

== Auction history ==
In 2014, the German casino operator WestSpiel, a subsidiary of the state bank of North Rhine-Westphalia, consigned two Warhol paintings—Triple Elvis [Ferus Type] (1963) and Four Marlons (1966)—to Christie's in New York. The decision prompted objections from museum directors and cultural figures, who warned that monetizing publicly owned artworks could establish a problematic precedent. Despite the controversy, both works sold on November 14, 2014, with Triple Elvis leading the evening and achieving $81.9 million, contributing to a combined total of $151.5 million for the two paintings. The result exceeded presale estimates and reflected sustained market demand for Warhol's pop art portraits. Although WestSpiel officials initially denied that proceeds would be used to cover losses, later financial reports indicated that the sale helped address WestSpiel's debts and fund casino renovations.

== See also ==
- Eight Elvises
- List of most expensive paintings
- List of all known Elvis silkscreens by Warhol
