= Do It Yourself (Violin) =

1962 painting by Andy Warhol

- Violin With Numbers
- Artist: Andy Warhol
- Year: 1962
- Medium: Acrylic, graphite, Letraset and crayon on linen
- Movement: Pop Art
- Dimensions: 137.2 cm × 182.9 cm (54.0 in × 72.0 in)

Do It Yourself (Violin) is a 1962 painting by American artist Andy Warhol. The work depicts a still life of a violin, a bowl of apples, a knife, and a vase using the visual conventions of a commercial paint-by-number kit. It is part of Warhol's five-part Do It Yourself series, in which he adapted mass-produced coloring designs into paintings. The painting sold at auction in 2026 for $25.9 million.

== Background ==
Andy Warhol produced his Do It Yourself paintings in 1962, during a transitional period in his career when he was moving away from commercial illustration and developing the Pop art style that would make him famous. The series comprises five paintings based on paint-by-number hobby kits marketed by Venus Paradise, a manufacturer of coloring materials. The subjects include Do It Yourself (Violin), Do It Yourself (Sailboat), Do It Yourself (Seascape), Do It Yourself (Flowers), and Do It Yourself (Landscape).

== Production ==
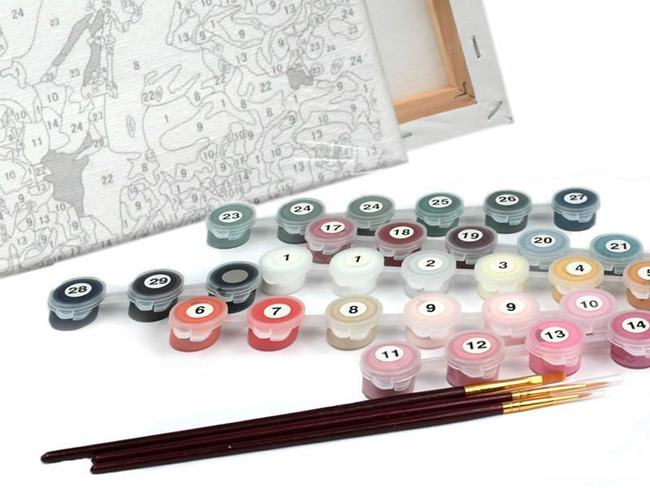
A paint-by-number kit featuring a numbered canvas, pots of paint in various colors, and paintbrushes

Warhol based his Do It Yourself series on commercial paint-by-number kits, which included pigments and outlined compositions on canvas board depicting subjects such as landscapes, seascapes, flowers, sailboats and still lifes. The kits instructed users to fill numbered areas with designated colors. Warhol copied the compositions while leaving portions unpainted and substituting colors of his own choosing. He added numbers using press-on lettering, sometimes departing from the numerals in the original designs. His friend David Bourdon assisted with applying the numbers to some of the canvases.

Warhol also produced a related drawings, Do It Yourself (Narcissus).

In the summer of 1962, Eleanor Ward, director of the Stable Gallery in New York, visited Warhol's studio to view his work. Among the paintings she saw were the Do It Yourself series, his Campbell's soup cans, Marilyn Diptych and Red Elvis. Ward subsequently offered Warhol an exhibition at the gallery in November, which became his first solo exhibition in New York. A painting from the Do It Yourself series was included in the show.

== Description ==
The painting depicts a violin alongside a bowl containing apples, a partially peeled apple and a vase. It measures 54 × 74 inches (137.2 × 182.9 cm). Warhol rendered the objects in acrylic, graphite, and crayon through outlined sections marked with Letraset dry-transfer numbers corresponding to colors in the original design. He filled only selected areas, leaving much of the canvas unpainted and the underlying drawing visible.

== Interpretation ==
The work's incomplete appearance distinguishes it from a conventional still-life painting. Rather than concealing the preparatory outlines or completing the image, Warhol retained the visual instructions that would ordinarily guide a painter through the process. The juxtaposition of colored and uncolored sections emphasizes the mechanical procedure behind the image.

Writer David Bourdon observed that "only an artist as irreverent and ironic as Warhol could have dreamed up the idea of transposing these kitsch, mass-produced images into 'originals' for an affluent audience, which prizes them for being among his wittiest and cheekiest artworks."

Art historian Stephen Knott challenged interpretations of Warhol's Do It Yourself series as a rejection of artistic skill, noting that the paintings were not "an exact replica of the actual merchandise" but incorporated deliberate alterations to the original designs. Although the kits were intended for use with crayon, Warhol used paint in much of the series, employing crayon for Do It Yourself (Violin). He also retained the numbered outlines and left portions of the composition unpainted. Knott identified "little hints, minute flourishes" that demonstrated Warhol's continued involvement in the painting process. He interpreted the series as exposing a tension between individual authorship and mass production, illustrating how "difference arises out of repetition."

Art critic Blake Gopnik of Artnet News described Do It Yourself (Violin) as an example of Pop art's "satire and celebration" of consumer culture. Gopnik wrote that the painting "rejects the idea of the precious 'hand of the artist,' substituting an absolutely mechanical gesture and process instead. It's in very obvious opposition to the very hand-y art of the Abstract Expressionists, whom Warhol and his peers were eager to supplant." Gopnik considered the painting conceptually complete despite its uncolored sections, arguing that its visible outlines and numbers made the idea more important than its execution. He also distinguished it from Warhol's earlier Pop paintings, interpreting the Do It Yourself series as "images of art—of real paint-by-number kits—as a filter through which the world gets seen, and reduced."

== Provence ==
Collectors Burton and Emily Hall Tremaine purchased Do It Yourself (Violin) from the Stable Gallery on October 17, 1962. The Tremaines sold it to Harold Diamond, Inc., in February 1980, and it subsequently entered a private collection that same month. By 2000, it had passed to Thomas Ammann Fine Art AG in Zurich, which consigned it to Gagosian Gallery in New York. The painting was acquired from the gallery by Samuel Irving Newhouse Jr. on October 23, 2000, and it is now in a private collection.

== Auction history ==
The painting was offered by the estate of Samuel Irving Newhouse Jr. at Christie's 20th Century Evening Sale in New York on May 18, 2026. It sold for $25.9 million after fees, meeting its $20-30 million estimate.
