= Four Marlons =

Painting by Andy Warhol

- Artist: Andy Warhol
- Year: 1966
- Medium: Silkscreen ink on unprimed linen
- Movement: Pop Art
- Subject: Marlon Brando
- Dimensions: 205.7 cm × 165.1 cm (81.0 in × 65.0 in)

Four Marlons is a 1966 painting by American artist Andy Warhol. The work depicts four repeated portraits of actor Marlon Brando in his role as Johnny Strabler from the 1953 film The Wild One. The painting is characteristic of Warhol's exploration of celebrity culture and repetition in his 1960s work. In 2014, the painting sold for $69.6 million at Christie's, ranking it among the most expensive paintings ever sold.

== Description ==
Measuring approximately 205.7 × 165.1 cm (81 × 65 in), Four Marlons features a grid of four nearly identical images of Brando's face and upper torso, rendered in silkscreen ink directly from a publicity still from The Wild One. By repeating this iconic image across a large raw canvas, Warhol transforms a mass-media photograph into a monumental portrait that reflects both the cult of celebrity and the mechanical reproduction techniques central to Pop art.

== Provenance and exhibitions ==
The work was previously in the collections of Swiss art gallery Thomas Ammann Fine Art (Zurich), Italian art dealer Gian Enzo Sperone (Turin), and Swiss art dealer Bruno Bischofberger (Zurich).

Four Marlons has appeared in major exhibitions, including Andy Warhol: Portraits at the Seattle Art Museum and Denver Art Museum in 1976–77, as well as solo exhibitions at Zurich's Kunsthaus (1978) and international retrospectives at the Neue Nationalgalerie (Berlin), Tate Modern (London), and the Museum of Contemporary Art (Los Angeles) in 2001–02. It was on display at the Spielbank Aachen in Aachen, Germany from 2003 to 2009. It was featured in the exhibition Le grand monde d'Andy Warhol at the Galeries nationales du Grand Palais in Paris from March to July 2009.

== Auction history ==
In 2014, the German casino conglomerate WestSpiel, a subsidiary of the state bank of North Rhine-Westphalia, consigned two Warhol paintings—Four Marlons (1966) and Triple Elvis [Ferus Type] (1963)—to Christie's in New York, drawing protests from museum directors and cultural figures who argued that selling public art for financial purposes could set a troubling precedent. Despite the controversy, both works sold at auction on November 14, 2014, with Four Marlons among the top lots, contributing $69.6 million to a combined total of $151.5 million for the two paintings. The painting sold significantly above its pre-sale estimate and reflecting continued market demand for Warhol's iconic pop art portraits. Although officials initially denied that proceeds would be used to cover losses, later financial reports indicated that the sale helped address WestSpiel's debts and fund casino renovations.
