= Shot Marilyns =

1964 series of paintings by Andy Warhol

- L-R: Shot Light Blue, Orange, Sage Blue, Red Marilyns
- Artist: Andy Warhol
- Year: 1964
- Medium: Acrylic and silkscreen ink on linen
- Movement: Pop Art
- Subject: Marilyn Monroe
- Dimensions: 101.6 cm × 101.6 cm (40.0 in × 40.0 in)

The Shot Marilyns are a series of five 1964 silkscreen paintings by American artist Andy Warhol depicting actress Marilyn Monroe. Based on a publicity photograph from the 1953 film Niagara taken by Gene Kornman, the paintings feature Monroe's portrait rendered in different color combinations and backgrounds.

The paintings acquired their collective title after performance artist Dorothy Podber fired a revolver through a stack of four of the canvases at Warhol's Factory studio in 1964. Although the damaged works were repaired, the incident permanently altered their history and contributed to their fame. The Shot Marilyns are among Warhol's most celebrated works and include some of the most expensive paintings ever sold, notably Shot Sage Blue Marilyn, which sold for $195 million in 2022, setting a record for the most expensive artwork by an American artist at auction.

== Background ==
Pop artist Andy Warhol had a fascination with Hollywood and fame since childhood. A legend of the silver screen, Marilyn Monroe is widely considered to be the epitome of Hollywood glamour. After her death at the age of 36 in August 1962, Warhol began immortalizing her in his work.

In 1964, Warhol revisited his recurring image of actress Marilyn Monroe in a series of large silkscreen portraits that later became known as the Shot Marilyns. Based on the same publicity still from the 1953 film Niagara photographed by Gene Kornman, the paintings continued Warhol's exploration of celebrity, repetition, and mass-media imagery that had defined his earlier Marilyn works from 1962, including Gold Marilyn Monroe, Marilyn Diptych, and Flavor Marilyns. Their title originated later that year when performance artist Dorothy Podber visited Warhol's Factory studio and fired a revolver through a stack of the paintings.

== Description ==
The series consists of five 40-inch square canvases, each distinguished by different color combinations and backgrounds: red, orange, light blue, sage blue, and turquoise. The Shot Marilyns differed from the earlier Flavor Marilyns (1962) in both scale and execution, featuring larger canvases, more luminous colors, and a more polished silkscreen technique that reflected Warhol's increasing mastery of the medium.

Although the sage blue and turquoise canvases share a similar blue-green background, the two paintings differ in their treatment of Monroe's facial features and color palette. In Shot Sage Blue Marilyn, Monroe's face is rendered in a vivid pink hue that heightens the artificiality of the image, while her earrings are painted the same sage color as the background, causing them to blend into the composition. By contrast, Turquoise Marilyn features a lighter, more naturalistic flesh tone and pink earrings that stand out against the turquoise backdrop. These subtle variations demonstrate Warhol's practice of altering color relationships within otherwise identical compositions.

== The shooting ==
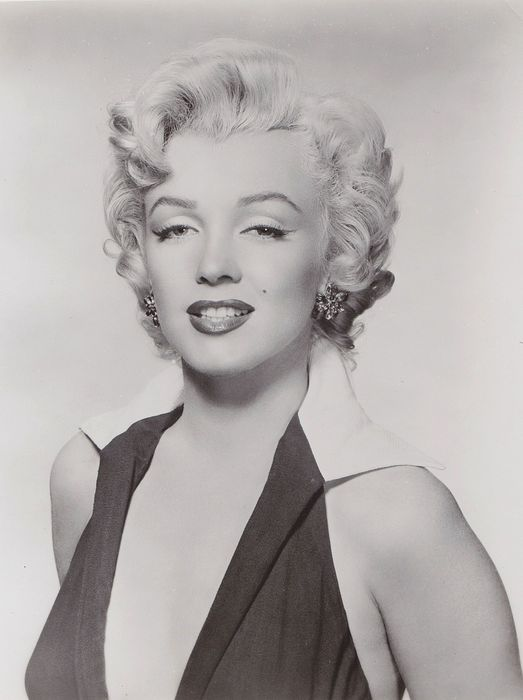
Publicity portrait of Marilyn Monroe for the 1953 film Niagara

During a visit to the Factory in the fall of 1964, performance artist Dorothy Podber arrived at the Factory accompanied by two friends and her Great Dane. Pobear was a former neighbor of Factory photographer Billy Name on the Lower East Side. Spotting a stack of newly completed Marilyn canvases leaning against a wall, Podber asked Warhol if she could "shoot" them. Believing she meant to photograph them, Warhol agreed. Podber then removed her gloves, drew a small pistol from her handbag, and fired a single shot through the stack of paintings, striking Monroe "right between the eyes," according to Name.

The incident reportedly shocked Warhol, who was visibly upset by the shooting, and Podber was thenceforth barred from the Factory for life. Although the damaged canvases were later repaired, the event permanently altered their history and gave rise to the collective title Shot Marilyns. Four of the five paintings were struck by the bullet, while a fifth canvas with the turquoise background was not damaged because it was not part of the stack. The mark of the bullet is still faintly visible, despite Warhol's best efforts to repair it. The paintings were therefore retitled Shot Light Blue Marilyn, Shot Orange Marilyn, Shot Sage Blue Marilyn, and Shot Red Marilyn.

=== Interpretation and legacy ===
The shooting of the Shot Marilyns has often been interpreted as more than a colorful anecdote in the history of Warhol's Factory. Art historians have noted that Podber's actions echoed many of the artistic concerns that Warhol himself was exploring, including authorship and originality. Although Warhol strongly disliked the incident, the repaired bullet damage became an inseparable part of the paintings' history, effectively making Podber's action part of the works themselves.

The episode has also been viewed as a form of performance art or "happening," a genre pioneered by artists such as Allan Kaprow. Podber's literal interpretation of the word "shoot"—commonly used to describe photographing a subject—introduced an element of linguistic play reminiscent of the puns and provocations associated with the Dada movement. Whether motivated by artistic intent or mischief, her actions transformed the Shot Marilyns into some of the most famous and valuable works in Warhol's oeuvre.

== Acquisitions ==
Shot Light Blue Marilyn was purchased by industrialist Peter Brant for $5,000 in 1967.

Shot Red Marilyn was sold to Masao Wanibuchi for $4.1 million at Christie's in 1989. In the midst of an art market recession, he sold it at a loss to Greek billionaire Philip Niarchos for $3.6 million in 1994.

Orange Marilyn was bought for $17.3 million by Condé Nast Chairman S. I. Newhouse Jr. at Sotheby's in 1998. At the time, that was a record for Warhol and the most expensive Pop art work sold at auction. After Newhouse's death, hedge fund manager Kenneth C. Griffin purchased the painting for around $200 million in 2017.

Turquoise Marilyn was bought by businessman Steve Cohen in 2007 for a rumored $80 million.

Shot Sage Blue Marilyn was first acquired by Leon Kraushar, a New York-based insurance broker and art collector; then New York art dealer Leo Castelli; and eventually S. I. Newhouse Jr., who sold it to Zurich art dealer and collector Thomas Ammann. The painting was last auctioned at Christie's in New York City in May 2022. It sold for $195 million from the Foundation of Thomas and Doris Ammann. This sale greatly extended the record for a price paid at auction for a work by an American artist, set by Jean-Michel Basquiat's 1982 painting Untitled, which sold for $110.5 million in 2017. It also set the mark for the most expensive work of 20th-century art sold in a public sale. The purchaser was the American art dealer Larry Gagosian. It has not been disclosed as of yet whether he was buying the work for himself or a secondary party.

== See also ==
- Gold Marilyn Monroe
- Marilyn Diptych
- List of most expensive paintings
