= Bloodhounds of Broadway (1952 film) =

1952 American film by Harmon Jones

- Theatrical release poster
- Directed by: Harmon Jones
- Written by: Sy Gomberg; Albert Mannheimer
- Based on: Bloodhounds of Broadway; 1931 story in Collier's by Damon Runyon
- Produced by: George Jessel
- Starring: Mitzi Gaynor; Scott Brady; Mitzi Green; Marguerite Chapman; Michael O'Shea
- Cinematography: Edward Cronjager
- Edited by: George A. Gittens
- Music by: Lionel Newman
- Distributed by: Twentieth Century-Fox
- Release dates: November 14, 1952 (New York); November 26, 1952 (Los Angeles)
- Running time: 90 minutes
- Country: United States
- Language: English
- Box office: $2 million (U.S. rentals)

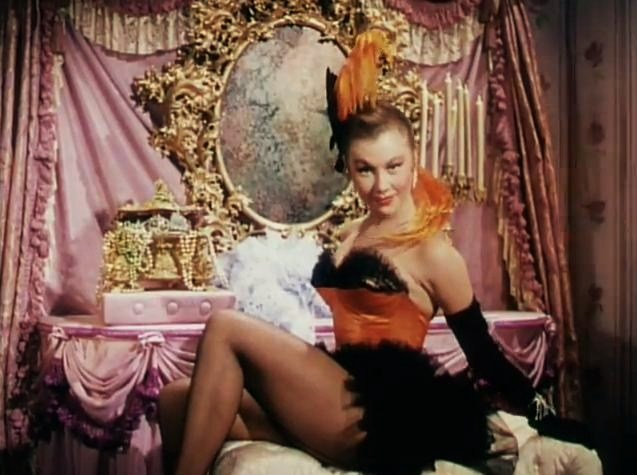
Mitzi Gaynor

Bloodhounds of Broadway is a 1952 Technicolor musical film directed by Harmon Jones, produced by George Jessel and starring Mitzi Gaynor and Scott Brady. The script is based on a 1931 Damon Runyon story of the same title that was published in Collier's. The film was remade in 1989.

== Plot ==
Emily Ann Stackerlee is a country girl who longs to work in showbusiness. She meets New York bookmaker Robert "Numbers Foster", who is hiding in Georgia.

== Cast ==
- Mitzi Gaynor as Emily Ann Stackerlee
- Scott Brady as Robert "Numbers" Foster
- Mitzi Green as "52nd Tessie" Sammis
- Marguerite Chapman as Yvonne Dugan
- Michael O'Shea as Inspector McNamara
- Wally Vernon as Harry "Poorly" Sammis
- George E. Stone as Ropes McGonigle
- Henry Slate as Dave the Dude
- Edwin Max as Lookout Louie Larchment
- Richard Allan as Curtaintime Charlie

== Production ==
Damon Runyan's story "The Bloodhounds of Broadway" was published in the May 16, 1931 issue of Collier's magazine.

Producer George Jessel unsuccessfully appealed to Judy Garland to play the lead female role. Gloria DeHaven was cast in the role in February 1952, with filming scheduled to begin on April 14. Mitzi Gaynor replaced DeHaven in March. Keenan Wynn had been cast as Harry Sammis but withdrew in order to appear in Sky Full of Moon.

== Reception ==
In a contemporary review for The New York Times, critic Bosley Crowther wrote: "What Twentieth Century-Fox has done to turn Mr. Runyon's obscure fiction into the stuff of a musical film is obviously not calculated to preserve the late writer's racy style. Just a trace of his brash exaggeration is detectable in the mild mileaus [sic] of night clubs and horse-rooms and flea-bags presented in this film. ... However, this amiable picture ... doesn't go too far astray in the field of musical romance—the field in which it is strewn—so the question is not whether it is Runyon but whether it is passable fun. On that point this cheerful department expresses a mild affirmative."

Critic John L. Scott of the Los Angeles Times wrote: "The picture combines melodrama, music and hillbilly comedy in its light but diverting plot. ... Most of 'Bloodhounds of Broadway' is told In easygoing fashion. While most of the principals look tough—they run a huge horsebetting ring—they all have sentimental streaks and are present chiefly for comedy purposes."
