= The Snows of Kilimanjaro (1952 film) =

1952 film by Henry King

- Theatrical release poster
- Directed by: Henry King
- Screenplay by: Casey Robinson
- Based on: "The Snows of Kilimanjaro" story in Esquire by Ernest Hemingway
- Produced by: Darryl F. Zanuck
- Starring: Gregory Peck; Susan Hayward; Ava Gardner; Leo G. Carroll; Torin Thatcher; Ava Norring; Helene Stanley; Marcel Dalio; Vicente Gómez; Richard Allan
- Cinematography: Leon Shamroy
- Edited by: Barbara McLean
- Music by: Bernard Herrmann
- Production company: 20th Century-Fox
- Distributed by: 20th Century-Fox
- Release dates: September 17, 1952 (New York); October 23, 1952 (Los Angeles)
- Running time: 114 minutes
- Country: United States
- Language: English
- Budget: $2.7–3 million
- Box office: $6.5–12.5 million

The Snows of Kilimanjaro is a 1952 American romantic adventure film directed by Henry King from a screenplay by Casey Robinson, based on Ernest Hemingway's 1936 short story of the same name first published in Esquire magazine in 1936 and then republished in The Fifth Column and the First Forty-Nine Stories (1938). It stars Gregory Peck as Harry Street, Susan Hayward as Helen, and Ava Gardner as Cynthia Green (a character invented for the film). The film's ending does not mirror that of the short story.

The Snows of Kilimanjaro was a critical and commercial success upon its release and became the third highest-grossing film of 1952. It was nominated for two Oscars at the 25th Academy Awards, for Best Cinematography, Color and Best Art Direction, Color (Lyle R. Wheeler, John DeCuir, Thomas Little, Paul S. Fox). The film has since entered the public domain.

== Plot ==
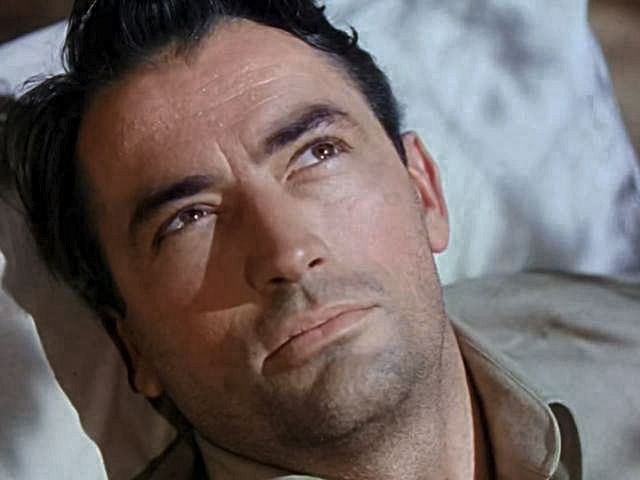
Harry Street recalls his memories from what he thinks is his deathbed in Africa

The film begins with the opening words of Hemingway's story: "Kilimanjaro is a snow-covered mountain 19,710 feet high, and is said to be the highest mountain in Africa. Close to the western summit there is the dried and frozen carcass of a leopard. No one has explained what the leopard was seeking at that altitude," though the film omits the second sentence of the original quote.

The story centers on the memories of a disillusioned writer, Harry Street, who is on safari in Africa. He has a severely infected wound from a thorn prick, and lies outside his tent awaiting a slow death, though in the film it is pointed out he may have acquired the infection from leaping into a muddy river to rescue one of the safari's porters from a hippopotamus after he falls in the river when Harry orders the boat closer to the hippopotamuses. His female companion, Helen, nurses Harry and hunts game for the larder.

The loss of mobility brings self-reflection. In an often delirious state he remembers his past relationship with Cynthia Green, whom he met in Paris as members of the "Lost Generation". Upon the sale of Harry's first novel, rather than rent a nicer home, Harry wishes to go on safari to Africa. There he has his happiest moments, including bagging a rhinoceros. Cynthia is pregnant, but worries about sharing this news with Harry, who is passionate about his travels and work as a journalist and author. Harry only learns about the pregnancy after her miscarriage. Suffering depression and sinking into alcoholism, she eventually leaves Harry for a flamenco dancer when she believes Harry is heading off for a job as a war correspondent.

Harry later becomes engaged to the wealthy and socially connected Countess Elizabeth, whom he meets on the Cote d'Azur; however, he still remains loyal to the memory of Cynthia. On the eve of their wedding, a jealous Elizabeth confronts Harry with a letter to Harry sent from Cynthia, who is now in Madrid. Elizabeth destroys the letter in front of Harry who stalks off to go to Spain. Unable to find Cynthia at the Madrid address on the envelope, he enlists to fight in the Spanish Civil War. During a battle he meets Cynthia, who is now an ambulance driver. Cynthia is mortally wounded, and Harry is shot and wounded when he deserts the battle to try to bring the dying Cynthia to a doctor.

Harry returns to Paris. While he is standing on a bridge watching the River Seine, he once again meets Helen, whom he had accosted earlier because he thought she was Cynthia. After the death of his beloved mentor Uncle Bill, Harry receives as a bequest a letter from his uncle that gives him the riddle of the leopard. Harry's bartender suggests that the leopard ended up there as he was on a false scent and became lost, but Harry takes Helen on a safari to Kenya to learn the answer of the riddle. He is injured and develops an infection. As Harry nears death, the protective Helen fights off a witch doctor. Following the directions in an emergency first aid manual, she opens Harry's wound to release the infection. At the dawn a medical party arrives by airplane. The vultures and hyena who have been awaiting Harry's death leave and never return. Harry realizes his love for Helen.

== Cast ==
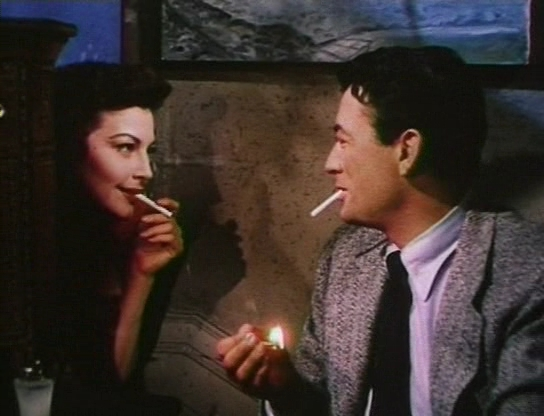
Gregory Peck and Ava Gardner meet

- Gregory Peck as Harry Street
- Susan Hayward as Helen
- Ava Gardner as Cynthia Green
- Hildegard Knef as Countess Elizabeth
- Emmett Smith as Molo
- Leo G. Carroll as Uncle Bill
- Torin Thatcher as Mr. Johnson
- Marcel Dalio as Emile
- Vicente Gómez as guitarist (as Vicente Gomez)
- Richard Allan as Spanish dancer

Uncredited actors

- Charles Bates as Harry Street (aged 17)
- Leonard Carey as Dr. Simmons
- Paul Thompson as witch doctor
- Ava Norring as Beatrice
- Helene Stanley as Connie
- Lisa Ferraday as vendeuse

== Production ==
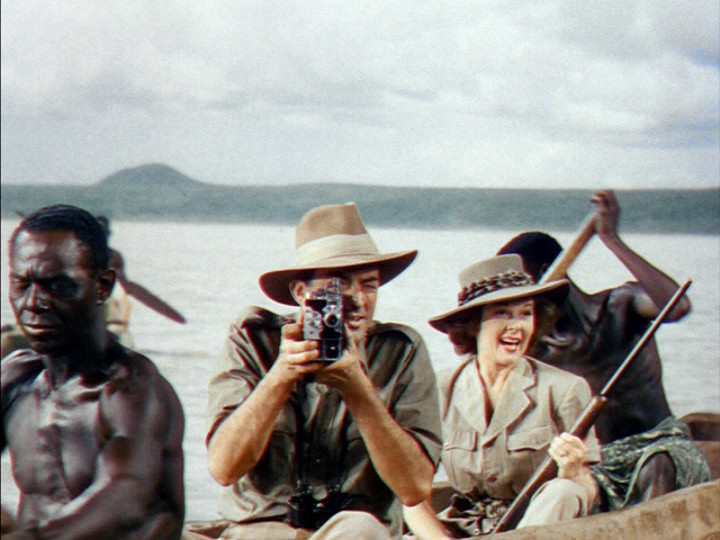
Peck and Susan Hayward

Twentieth Century-Fox bought the rights to the story in June 1948, paying $125,000.

=== Casting ===
Humphrey Bogart, Richard Conte and Marlon Brando were all reported to be under consideration for the male lead, as was Dale Robertson.

=== Filming ===
The film was shot on location in Nairobi, Kenya, Cairo, Egypt, and the French Riviera, and studio work was done at Stage 14 in 20th Century Fox Studios. During production, on April 8, 1952, when Peck was carrying Gardner for a scene in the film, Peck wrenched his knee and production had to be postponed for 10 days while he recovered in his Pacific Palisades home, and Hildegard Knef came down with influenza in the studios. She was able though to sing two Cole Porter tunes in the film. Jazz musician Benny Carter performs early on in the film.

The bullfight sequences were archive footage, taken from Fox's 1941 film Blood and Sand. Circus animal trainer Pat Anthony replaced Gregory Peck as his stand-in for the hyena encounter scene.

== Reception ==
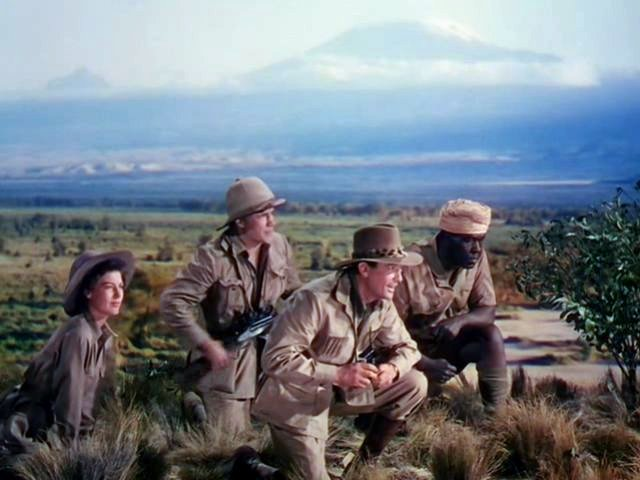
On studio set “location“ for Kenya

Helped by a star-studded cast, the film was one of the most successful films of the early 1950s and earned $12.5 million at the box office, very high for that period. Variety said it earned domestic rentals of $5.6 million.

=== Critical ===
The film was much acclaimed by critics, although some vary in their opinion of it, ranging from "simply plodding" to "much-maligned". The cinematography was highly acclaimed in particular, and even the sophisticated interiors were praised. Bosley Crowther of The New York Times described the cinematography as "magnificent and exciting" and said that the "overall production in wonderful color is full of brilliant detail and surprise and the mood of nostalgia and wistful sadness that is built up in the story has its spell." He praised Peck's character for his "burning temper and melancholy moods", although he said that Ava Gardner was "pliant and impulsive" in a role "as soggy and ambiguous as any in the film". Variety praised the film as "an often engrossing dramatic mixture of high adventure, romance and symbolism," adding that "the color coating used to display the story's varied locales is beautiful," and "Miss Gardner has never been better." Harrison's Reports called it "at once absorbing, exciting, and fascinating." The Monthly Film Bulletin, however, wrote that Hemingway's dialogue sounded "stilted and a little dated" on the screen, and that "any real seriousness that the film might have retained is nullified by the ending. Letting Harry survive makes of the film a naive kind of spiritual success story with a conventional boy-meets-lots-of-girls plot." Variety commented "the script broadens the short story considerably without losing the Hemingway penchant for the mysticism behind his virile characters and lusty situations.

Craig Butler of AllMovie opines, "The Snows of Kilimanjaro has not aged well over the years...The screenplay (is) in a bit of a no man's land, not really Hemingway, but not quite the real world either. Visually, however, Kilimanjaro is a feast, with the camera capturing the full beauty of its often-stunning locations and also finding emotion in the 'character' scenes. The art direction is lovely...Gardner and Peck create the appropriate romantic chemistry...the direction is uneven...there's still enough here to engage most fans of romance movies."

A more recent appraisal in Bowker's Directory described it as having "plenty of action & romance" and stated that it was "the popular 'celebrity film' of its time". Hemingway, who disliked the typical Hollywood happy ending, accepted the money for the film, but he could not bring himself to view it, according to one report. However, in a 1954 article for Look magazine, Hemingway said a hyena (voiced by Director King from behind the camera) was the best performer in the picture, which the writer called The Snows of Zanuck.

The film was nominated for two Academy Awards; for Best Cinematography and Best Art Direction (Lyle R. Wheeler, John DeCuir, Thomas Little, Paul S. Fox).

== Home media ==
20th Century Fox released the film on DVD in March 2007, separately and as part of five-disc collection entitled "The Ernest Hemingway Film Collection", where it was packaged with Under My Skin, The Sun Also Rises, A Farewell to Arms, and Hemingway's Adventures of a Young Man.
