= Emily and Jerry Spiegel =

American real estate developers and art collectors

- The Spiegels in 1988
- Occupations: Real estate developers; art collectors
- Children: 2

Emily Spiegel
- Born: Emily Joy Rosenblatt; December 21, 1928; New York City, U.S.
- Died: February 16, 2009 (aged 80)
- Spouse: Jerry Spiegel (m. 1954)

Jerry Spiegel
- Born: July 4, 1925; New York City, U.S.
- Died: November 3, 2009 (aged 84)
- Spouse: Emily Rosenblatt (m. 1954; died 2009)

Emily Joy Spiegel (née Rosenblatt; December 21, 1928 – February 16, 2009) and Jerome E. Spiegel (July 4, 1925 – November 3, 2009) were American real estate developers and art collectors based in Long Island, New York.

== Early life ==
Jerome E. "Jerry" Spiegel was born in Brooklyn, New York City on July 4, 1925. His father died when he was three years old. Much of his childhood was spent on his uncle's 115-acre potato farm in Smithtown, Long Island, New York.

Emily Joy Rosenblatt was born on December 21, 1928, and died on February 16, 2009. She was the daughter of Jacob H. Rosenblatt and Carrie Skloot Rosenblatt, who was an interior designer, and died on November 22, 2000, aged 94.

== Career ==
In 1945, Jerome started his first company in Hicksville, building suburban housing for soldiers coming home from the Second World War, and by 1950 was building one home per day. In 1952, he built the Nassau Farmers Market, Long Island's first indoor shopping center, and by 1971 was the largest individual owner of commercial and industrial real estate on Long Island. He died on November 3, 2009.

== Art collectors ==
They collected post-war American and German painting and sculpture, and photography.

They were "early champions " of artists including Sigmar Polke, Gerhard Richter, Christopher Wool and Anselm Kiefer. They also collected works by photographers including Edward Steichen, Man Ray, Paul Outerbridge, Paul Strand and Diane Arbus.

Each daughter received roughly half (by value) of their parents' collection and in May 2017 held rival sales, Pamela with Christie's, Lise with Sotheby's. Lise only auctioned one work, Jean-Michel Basquiat's 1982 Untitled, which her parents had bought for $19,000 in 1984; it sold for $110.5 million to Japanese billionaire entrepreneur and art collector Yusaku Maezawa.

== Personal life ==
In 1954, Emily Rosenblatt married Jerome Spiegel in Queens, New York City.

They had two daughters, Pamela Sanders and Lise Spiegel Wilks, who have "a long-standing feud of unknown origin", and do not speak to each other. Both sisters graduated from the University of Pennsylvania and are both married to men who are in real estate.

Emily and Jerry Spiegel lived at 10 Broadlawn Avenue in Kings Point, Long Island, New York. They both died in 2009.

== Legacy ==
In 1953, they founded the Jerry and Emily Spiegel Family Foundation, which funded charitable, community and educational projects across Long Island. The Foundation is responsible for the Jerry and Emily Spiegel Theater at Hofstra University, and a wing at Long Island Jewish Medical Center.

In 2001, they donated Andy Warhol's 1963 painting Double Elvis to the Museum of Modern Art. The gift was in honor of Kirk Varnedoe, friend to the Spiegels and chief curator of painting and sculpture there from 1988 to 2001.
