= John DeCuir =

American art director

- Born: June 4, 1918; San Francisco, California
- Died: October 29, 1991 (aged 73); Santa Monica, California
- Occupation: Art director
- Years active: 1942–1984
- Children: John DeCuir Jr.

John DeCuir (June 4, 1918 – October 29, 1991) was a Hollywood art director and production designer known for his elaborate set designs that were illustrated with his own watercolor paintings.

DeCuir studied at the Chouinard Art School, joined Universal in the late 1930s, and by the mid-1940s was designing sets. In 1949, he signed with 20th Century Fox where he worked on productions with elaborate sets. These included dramatic material such as The House on Telegraph Hill (1951), musicals including There's No Business Like Show Business 1954), and comedy Ghostbusters (1984). DeCuir earned eleven Oscar nominations, winning three: The King and I (1956), Cleopatra (1963), and Hello, Dolly! (1969). DeCuir designed the short-lived exhibit devoted to horror film at Movieland Wax Museum in Buena Park, CA called The Black Box.

His son, John DeCuir Jr. is also a production designer.

== Partial filmography ==
- The Naked City (1948)
- The House on Telegraph Hill (1951)
- My Cousin Rachel (1952)
- The Snows of Kilimanjaro (1952)
- Diplomatic Courier (1952)
- Call Me Madam (1953)
- There's No Business like Show Business (1954)
- Three Coins in the Fountain (1954)
- Daddy Long Legs (1955)
- The King and I (1956)
- South Pacific (1958)
- A Certain Smile (1958)
- The Big Fisherman (1959)
- Seven Thieves (1960)
- Cleopatra (1963)
- Circus World (1964)
- The Agony and the Ecstasy (1965)
- The Honey Pot (1967)
- The Taming of the Shrew (1967)
- Hello, Dolly (1969)
- The Great White Hope (1970)
- On a Clear Day You Can See Forever (1970)
- The Other Side of Midnight (1977)
- Dead Men Don't Wear Plaid (1982)
- Ghostbusters (1984)

== See also ==
- Art Directors Guild Hall of Fame
