= Mary Callery =

American artist

- Callery in 1952
- Born: June 19, 1903; New York City, USA
- Died: February 12, 1977 (aged 73); Paris, France
- Known for: Sculpture
- Movement: Abstract expressionism; American Figurative Expressionism

Mary Callery (June 19, 1903 – February 12, 1977) was an American artist known for her Modern and Abstract Expressionist sculpture. She was part of the New York School art movement of the 1940s, 1950s and 1960s.

It is said she "wove linear figures of acrobats and dancers, as slim as spaghetti and as flexible as India rubber, into openwork bronze and steel forms. A friend of Picasso, she was one of those who brought the good word of French modernism to America at the start of World War II".

== Biography ==
=== Early life and education ===
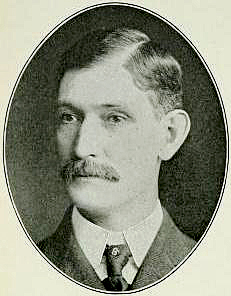
James Dawson Callery (1901)

Mary Callery was born June 19, 1903, in New York City and raised in Pittsburgh, Pennsylvania. She was the daughter of Julia Welch and James Dawson Callery, the President of the Diamond National Bank and Chairman of Pittsburgh Railways Company.

Callery studied at the Art Students League of New York (1921–1925) with Edward McCartan and moved to Paris in 1930. From 1930 to 1940, Callery worked in France, where she met and became friends with Pablo Picasso, Henri Matisse, Fernand Léger, Alexander Calder, Aristide Maillol, and other leading artists of the day and collected their art. During this same period, she also developed her talents as a modern sculptor, studying privately under Jacques Loutchansky.

=== Career ===
When Germany occupied Paris during World War II, she returned to the United States with "more Picassos than anyone in America" according to Alfred Barr of the Museum of Modern Art.

After returning to New York, Callery played an instrumental role in the development and growth of ULAE (Universal Limited Art Editions, Inc.). For many years, ULAE primarily published reproductions. It is thought by many that Mary Callery was the first artist to print original work at ULAE. Callery's first edition with ULAE, Sons of Morning, was completed in 1955. The paper that Callery's second edition, Variations on a Theme of “Callery-Léger”, was printed on was called the “Callery gray” was used by Mrs. Grosman for the studio's first printed labels, and is still the trademark gray ULAE uses today.

Callery's sculpture at the Metropolitan Opera

Architect Philip Johnson, whom she had met her in Paris, became a close friend, and he introduced her to major players in the world of business and art in New York, including Nelson and Abby Rockefeller. Wallace Harrison, who along with Johnson, was responsible for the design of Lincoln Center, commissioned Callery to create a sculpture for the top of the proscenium arch at the Metropolitan Opera House. Described as "an untitled ensemble of bronze forms creating a bouquet of sculptured arabesques," it is perhaps her best known work. It is most affectionately known by The Metropolitan Opera Company members as "The Car Wreck" and more infrequently as "Spaghetti Spoon in Congress with Plumbers Strap."

She was represented by the prestigious art dealers M. Knoedler & Co. and the Curt Valentin Gallery, and she exhibited in more than twenty noteworthy solo and group exhibitions. She became an acquaintance of Georgia O'Keeffe and in 1945 made a sculpture of O'Keeffe's head.

In 1945, she was invited to join the summer faculty of Black Mountain College in North Carolina, where she taught alongside Josef Albers, Robert Motherwell, Lyonel Feininger, and Walter Gropius.

=== Personal life ===
In 1923, she married Frederic R. Coudert Jr., lawyer (and future member of Congress). They had one daughter, Caroline, born in 1926. Mary sought a divorce from Coudert in 1930 and in 1931 married Italian textile industrialist and fine art collector Carlo Frua de Angeli. This second marriage also ended in divorce. Following the beginning of the Second World War, she carried on a romantic relationship with architect Mies van der Rohe who designed an artist's studio for her in Huntington, on Long Island, New York.

=== Later life and death ===
In her later years, Callery maintained studios in New York, Huntington, Long Island, and Paris. She died on February 12, 1977, at the American Hospital of Paris. She is buried in Cadaqués, Spain.

== Solo exhibitions ==
- 1944, 1947, 1950, 1952, 1955: Buchholz Gallery, New York City
- 1946: Arts Club of Chicago
- 1947, 1949, 1950–1952, 1955: Curt Valentin Gallery, New York City
- 1949: Salon du Mai, Paris
- 1951: Margaret Brown Gallery, Boston, Massachusetts
- 1954: Galerie des Cahiers d'Art
- 1957, 1961, 1965: M. Knoedler & Co., New York City
- 1962: M. Knoedler & Co., Paris
- 1968: C. Holland Gallery, New York

== Group exhibitions ==
- 1939: Salon des Tuileries, Paris; The Museum of Modern Art, New York City; The Whitney Museum of American Art, NYC; The Art Institute of Chicago; Museum of Fine Arts, Houston, Texas
- 1946: The City Art Museum of St. Louis, Missouri
- 1947-52: Painting toward architecture (Miller Company Collection of Abstract Art) at the Wadsworth Atheneum and 24 other venues
- 1949: 3rd Sculpture International at the Philadelphia Museum of Art, Philadelphia, Pennsylvania
- 1956: Munson-Williams-Proctor Institute, Utica, New York
- 1958: Dallas Museum of Art, Dallas, Texas; Brussels World's Fair
- 2000: The Enduring Figure 1890s-1970s: Sixteen Sculptors from the National Association of Women Artists at Zimmerli Art Museum, Rutgers, The State University of New Jersey, New Brunswick, NJ (December 12, 1999 – March 12, 2000).

== Collections ==
- Addison Gallery of American Art, Phillips Academy, Andover, Massachusetts
- The Aldrich Contemporary Art Museum, Ridgefield, Connecticut
- CIT Corporation
- The Cincinnati Art Museum, Cincinnati, Ohio
- The Detroit Institute of Arts, Detroit, Michigan
- Eastland Shopping Center, Detroit
- Hirshhorn Museum and Sculpture Garden, Washington, DC
- Indianapolis Museum of Art
- Laughlin Children's Center, Sewickley, Pennsylvania
- The Wadsworth Atheneum, Hartford, Connecticut
- The Museum of Modern Art, New York City
- National Gallery of Art, Washington, DC
- New York University, New York City
- San Francisco Museum of Modern Art, San Francisco, California
- Stevens Institute of Technology, Williams Library, Hoboken, New Jersey
- Toledo Museum of Art, Toledo, Ohio
- The Whitney Museum of American Art, New York City
- The Metropolitan Opera House, New York City
- The Governor Nelson A. Rockefeller Empire State Plaza Art Collection, Albany, NY

== Bibliography ==
- John I. H. Baur, Revolution and Tradition in modern American Art, Cambridge, Harvard University Press, 1951
- Ulrich Gertz, Contemporary plastic art, Berlin, Rembrandt-Verlag, 1955
- Carola Giedion-Welcker, Contemporary sculpture, an evolution in volume and space, New York, G. Wittenborn, 1961, ©1960
- Fred Licht, Sculpture, 19th & 20th centuries, Greenwich, Connecticut, New York Graphic Society, 1967
- E.H. Ramsden, Sculpture: theme and variations, towards a contemporary aesthetic, London, Lund, Humphries, 1953
- Herbert Read, A concise history of modern sculpture, New York, Praeger, 1964 ISBN 0-19-519941-3, ISBN 978-0-19-519941-3
- Andrew Carnduff Ritchie, Sculpture of the twentieth century (exhibition catalogue), New York: Museum of Modern Art, ©1952
- Michel Seuphor, The sculpture of the century: dictionary of modern sculpture, Zwemmer, 1960
- Eduard Trier, Form and space; sculpture of the twentieth century, New York, Praeger, 1962
- Philip R. Adams, Mary Callery Sculpture. Distributed by Wittenborn and Company, New York, 1961
- Marika Herskovic, American Abstract Expressionism of the 1950s An Illustrated Survey (New York School Press, 2003.) ISBN 0-9677994-1-4
