= Marilyn Diptych =

Silkscreen painting by Andy Warhol

- Artist: Andy Warhol
- Year: 1962
- Medium: Silkscreen ink and acrylic paint on canvas
- Dimensions: 205.44 cm × 289.56 cm (80.88 in × 114.00 in)
- Location: Tate Modern, London

Marilyn Diptych is a 1962 silkscreen painting by American artist Andy Warhol depicting actress Marilyn Monroe. Created shortly after Monroe's death in August 1962, the work consists of fifty repeated images based on a publicity still from the 1953 film Niagara photographed by Gene Kornman. The painting is divided into two adjoining panels, with brightly colored portraits on the left and fading black-and-white impressions on the right.

The work is regarded as one of Warhol's most important paintings and one of the most influential works of Pop art. Critics and scholars have frequently interpreted the contrast between the vibrant colored images and deteriorating monochrome reproductions as a meditation on Monroe's public image and death. Originally purchased directly from Warhol by art collectors Emily Hall Tremaine and Burton Tremaine, the painting entered the collection of the Tate in London in 1980.

== Background ==
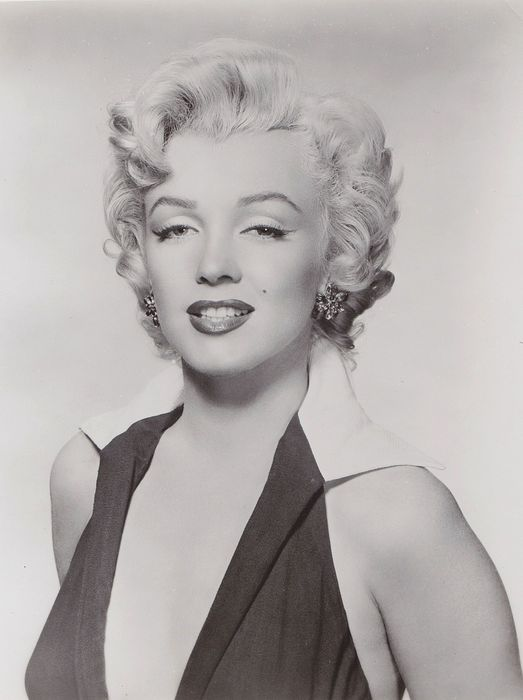
The original publicity photo of Monroe for Niagara, 1953

Pop artist Andy Warhol began his career in the 1950s as a commercial illustrator in New York City, producing advertisements for I. Miller shoes and illustrations for publications including Glamour, Vogue, Harper's Bazaar, and The New York Times. By the early 1960s, he had transitioned into Pop art, creating works based on mass-produced consumer imagery such as Campbell's Soup cans and Coca-Cola bottles.

Actress Marilyn Monroe died from a barbiturate overdose on August 4, 1962, at the age of 36. She had become one of Hollywood's most recognizable stars during the 1950s after signing with Twentieth Century-Fox, appearing in films such as The Asphalt Jungle (1950), All About Eve (1950), Gentlemen Prefer Blondes (1953), Niagara (1953), and The Seven Year Itch (1955). Despite her celebrity and commercial success, Monroe often struggled against Hollywood's typecasting of her as a "dumb blonde" stereotype.

From an early age, Warhol was fascinated by celebrity, fashion, Hollywood, and popular culture. Growing up in a working-class family in Pittsburgh, he escaped everyday life through movie magazines and by collecting autographs from film stars. Shortly after Monroe's death, Warhol began producing silkscreen portraits based on a publicity still from Niagara photographed by Gene Kornman. The image became the basis for a large body of Marilyn works created between 1962 and 1967, including Gold Marilyn Monroe (1962), Flavor Marilyns (1962), the Shot Marilyns (1964), and Marilyn Monroe (1967).

== Technique and production ==
Warhol adopted the silkscreen process working in his home studio at 1342 Lexington Avenue, which enabled him to reproduce photographic images repeatedly while preserving minor variations between impressions. He later described the process in his memoir POPism: The Warhol '60s (1980):

In August '62 I started doing silkscreens. The rubber-stamp method I'd been using to repeat images suddenly seemed too homemade; I wanted something stronger that gave more of an assembly-line.
With silkscreening, you pick a photograph, blow it up, transfer it in glue onto silk, and then roll ink across it so the ink goes through the silk but not through the glue. That way you get the same image, slightly different each time. It was all so simple—quick and chancy. I was thrilled with it. My first experiments with screens were heads of Troy Donahue and Warren Beatty, and then when Marilyn Monroe happened to die that month, I got the idea to make screens of her beautiful face—the first Marilyns.

Created in the weeks following her death, Warhol initially conceived Marilyn Diptych as separate works, but during a 1962 visit to his studio, art director and collector Emily Hall Tremaine and her husband Burton Tremaine encountered Warhol before he had secured gallery representation, when he was selling works directly from his studio. Tremaine later recalled that Warhol first showed them the black-and-white Marilyn paintings, followed by the colored version. She suggested that the two canvases be presented as a diptych, to which Warhol enthusiastically agreed. As Tremaine recounted, "we all saw we had achieved a very complex and moving statement about Marilyn, so I really felt I was a collaborator!" According to Warhol's friend David Bourdon, however, Warhol frequently solicited visitors' opinions as a form of informal polling, and Tremaine was not the only person to suggest combining the canvases. The Tremaines purchased both canvases, which thereafter remained a single artwork.

Around the same period, Warhol also produced related Marilyn works, including Marilyn x 100, Twenty-Five Colored Marilyns, Marilyn Monroe Twenty Times, and The Six Marilyns (Marilyn Six-Pack).

== Description ==
The work consists of two companion seven-by-six-foot canvases bearing fifty repeated images of Monroe. The images on the left are brightly colored, while those on the right progressively fade into black and white, creating a visual effect likened to enlarged strips of movie film. Warhol explained the effect in 1967: "She was absolutely beautiful, and I had the feeling that she was changing; that she was becoming more of herself than what a movie studio told her to be. I put this on canvas, as though it was a movie, so that you can see the change every second."

== Interpretation ==
Marilyn Diptych reflects Warhol's interest in fame, repetition, and the imagery of mass media. In the monochrome section, Monroe's face gradually deteriorates from a sharp photographic image into blurred and uneven impressions resembling smudged newspaper reproductions, while the colored side features vivid, off-register prints in intense hues. Writer David Bourdon noted that Warhol never assigned a definitive meaning to the relationship between the two panels. Some critics and scholars have frequently interpreted the contrast between the two halves as a meditation on Monroe's public image and mortality, evoking the tension between celebrity, glamour, and death.

== Exhibitions ==
Marilyn Diptych was first exhibited in 1963 as part of Six Painters and the Object at the Solomon R. Guggenheim Museum in New York. It was subsequently included in The New Art at the Davison Art Center, Wesleyan University in Middletown, Connecticut, in 1964, where only the left-hand panel was exhibited, and in The Atmosphere of '64 at the Institute of Contemporary Art, University of Pennsylvania in Philadelphia, the same year. Further exhibitions included The New American Realism at the Worcester Art Museum in 1965 and Art of the United States: 1690–1966 at the Whitney Museum of American Art in New York in 1966.

In December 1967, the work was exhibited at the Sidney Janis Gallery in New York as part of Homage to Marilyn Monroe. It was subsequently included in Warhol retrospectives at the Pasadena Art Museum, Museum of Contemporary Art in Chicago, Stedelijk van Abbemuseum in Eindhoven, Musée d'Art Moderne de la Ville de Paris, Tate Gallery in London, and Whitney Museum of American Art between 1970 and 1971. Later exhibitions included Printed Art: A View of Two Decades at the Museum of Modern Art in New York in 1980 and Major Works of the '60s at Pace Gallery in New York the same year.

== Provenance ==
Marilyn Diptych was originally owned by art collectors Emily Hall Tremaine and Burton Tremaine, who purchased the painting directly from Warhol in 1962. In July 1980, the Tremaines sold the work to the Tate Gallery in London for $270,000.

== Legacy ==
The work has received critical acclaim, including from Kathleen Davenport, director of the Rice University Art Gallery in Houston, who ranked it the ninth most influential visual artwork in the past 1,000 years. The Guardian named the painting the third most influential piece of modern art in a survey of 500 artists, critics, and others in 2004. American academic and cultural critic Camille Paglia, who in Glittering Images (2012) praised the painting for capturing the "multiplicity of meanings" surrounding Monroe's life and legacy.

== See also ==
- Gold Marilyn Monroe
- Shot Marilyns
- Marilyn Monroe
