= Dorothy Podber =

American performance artist (1932–2008)

- Podber in 2007
- Born: August 15, 1932; New York City, U.S.
- Died: February 9, 2008 (aged 75); New York City, U.S.
- Occupation: Performance artist

Dorothy Podber (September 15, 1932 – February 9, 2008) was an American performance artist and trickster who shot a bullet through a stack of four Andy Warhol paintings of Marilyn Monroe which were then famous as the Shot Marilyns.

== Early schemes ==
Born in the Bronx to a mother who had tried repeatedly to abort her and to a father who worked for the Jewish mobster Dutch Schultz, Podber was later remembered as a disruptive influence by classmates from West Walton High School.

She was involved with the New York City art scene in the 1950s and 1960s. She helped to run the Nonagon Gallery which dealt with artists like Yoko Ono and held jazz concerts by Charles Mingus, among the crowd that included Allen Ginsberg, Billy Name, and Jasper Johns. However, she is known primarily for being a collaborator with artists such as Andy Warhol.

Podber and her Great Dane went to The Factory one day in 1964 where Andy Warhol was working. Spotting a stack of four silk screen Marilyn Monroe paintings, she asked Warhol if she could shoot them and he said yes, assuming she intended to take a photo. Podber doffed her pair of black gloves, withdrew a small revolver from her purse, and fired a shot into the paintings, striking Marilyn "right between the eyes," said witness Billy Name. Podber was banned from the studio for life. Warhol attempted to repair the bullet marks, but the permanent damage made the four paintings far more valuable than other Marilyns. They became sensational and are still known as The Shot Marilyns, and two of them are among the most expensive paintings ever sold.

Podber reveled in her bad-girl reputation. In an interview in 2006, she said:

I've been bad all my life. Playing dirty tricks on people is my specialty.

== Further schemes ==
Dorothy Podber organized bizarre experiences with performance artist Ray Johnson, who called her "sort of a terrorist". In one instance, for example, they insisted a person invite them over only to enter the home and immediately use the host's record player to play a track of people stuttering, a record created for speech therapy that was uncomfortable in other settings. During a "dead animal phase" they gave people gifts each with a compartment containing surprise, often a rat painted gold.

When funds were low, she found unorthodox ways of making money, engaging schemes as diverse as running an illegal abortion referral service to dispatching maids to doctors' offices to steal narcotics from their drug cabinets. The latter pursuit let to her being charged with grand larceny in 1963, and she went to jail for lack of the $1000 bail. Podber did paperwork for B'nai Brith long enough to pick its safe and use its contents on her own check-counterfeiting machine. Her attitude to these enterprises bordered on indifference. "I never worked much," she reputedly said.

She was married three times, never having children, and enjoyed numerous casual liaisons. Her last husband was Lester Schwartz who had a long-term relationship with actor/director Julian Beck. Podber cited bisexuality as something she and Schwartz shared before he died in 1986. One boyfriend was a banker with whom she only had sexual intercourse on the banknote-strewn floor of his firm's vault.

Dorothy Podber died in her Manhattan apartment on February 9, 2008, from natural causes, aged 75.

== Sources ==
- Livingstone, Marco (ed.), Pop Art: An International Perspective, The Royal Academy of Arts, London, 1991, ISBN 0-8478-1475-0
- Stokstad, Marilyn, Art History, 1995, Prentice Hall, Inc., and Harry N. Abrams, Inc., Publishers, ISBN 0-8109-1960-5
- Vogel, Carol (1998). The New York Times: INSIDE ART; Perhaps Shot, Perhaps Not. Retrieved January 4, 2008.
- Warhol, Andy and Pat Hackett, Popism: The Warhol Sixties, Harcourt Books, 1980, ISBN 0-15-672960-1
- Watson, Steven, Factory Made: Warhol and the Sixties, Pantheon Books, 2003.
