= Richard Allan (actor) =

American actor and dancer (1923–1999)

- Born: Richard Mann Allan; June 23, 1923; Jacksonville, Illinois, U.S.
- Died: September 6, 1999 (aged 76); Louisville, Kentucky, U.S.
- Burial place: Gillham Cemetery
- Occupations: actor; dancer
- Years active: 1945–1964

Richard Mann Allan (June 22, 1923 – September 6, 1999) was an American actor. He was best known for his appearances with Susan Hayward in With a Song in My Heart (1952), Ava Gardner in The Snows of Kilimanjaro (1952), and Marilyn Monroe in Niagara (1953).

== Early life ==
Richard Mann Allan was born on June 22, 1923, in Jacksonville, Illinois, as the youngest child and son of the four children of Edna Mann (1893–1973), a dietitian, and Robert Howard Allan (1895–1958), a farmer. He had two brothers, Edward and Robert Howard Allan Jr. (1922–2009), and a sister, Catherine Allan. Allan attended dancing class from the age of seven.

== Personal life ==
Allan was gay.

== Career ==
Allan appeared in films, such as The Snows of Kilimanjaro (1952) and Bloodhounds of Broadway (1952). His most remembered appearances were as Susan Hayward's dancing partner in Walter Lang's musical directed With a Song in My Heart (1952) and as Marilyn Monroe's lover Patrick in Henry Hathaway's noir directed Niagara (1953). In the late 1950s Allan played in various German productions.

== Death ==
Allan died in Louisville, Kentucky, due to lung cancer at the age of 76. He was buried at Gillham Cemetery.

== Filmography ==
=== Film ===
Year	Film	Role	Notes
1949	Neptune's Daughter	Dancer	Uncredited
1950	Duchess of Idaho	Dancer	Uncredited
1950	Wabash Avenue	Lou	Uncredited
1950	Love That Brute	Chorus Boy	Uncredited
1950	My Blue Heaven	Dancer	Uncredited
1951	Halls of Montezuma	Pvt. Stewart	Uncredited
1951	Call Me Mister	Stewart	Uncredited
1951	A Place in the Sun	George Eastman	Body double for Montgomery Clift
1951	The Frogmen		Uncredited
1952	With a Song in My Heart	Dancer	With Susan Hayward
1952	Down Among the Sheltering Palms	Officer	Uncredited
1952	Dreamboat	Student	Uncredited
1952	O. Henry's Full House	Pete	Uncredited
1952	The Snows of Kilimanjaro	Spanish Dancer	With Ava Gardner
1952	Bloodhounds of Broadway	Charlie	
1953	Niagara	Ted Patrick	With Marilyn Monroe
1954	The Egyptian	Student	Uncredited
1955	The Racers	Mechanic	Uncredited
1956	The Best Things in Life Are Free	Dancer	Uncredited
1957	The Simple Girl	Robert Holden	
1957	Casino de Paris	Dancer	Uncredited
1958	...und abends in die Scala	Nico	
1958	The Csardas King	Stefan	
1958	Kleine Leute mal ganz groß	Bob McFadden	
1959	The Rest Is Silence	Stanley Goulden	
1962	The Horizontal Lieutenant	Officer	Uncredited
1964	Dead Woman from Beverly Hills	Cesare Giovanni	Uncredited
