= With a Song in My Heart (film) =

1952 film by Walter Lang

- Theatrical release poster
- Directed by: Walter Lang
- Written by: Lamar Trotti
- Produced by: Lamar Trotti; Darryl F. Zanuck (uncredited)
- Starring: Susan Hayward; Rory Calhoun; David Wayne; Thelma Ritter; Robert Wagner; Helen Westcott; Una Merkel; Richard Allan; Max Showalter
- Cinematography: Leon Shamroy
- Edited by: J. Watson Webb Jr.
- Music by: Alfred Newman
- Distributed by: 20th Century Fox
- Release date: April 4, 1952 (United States)
- Running time: 117 minutes
- Country: United States
- Language: English
- Box office: $3.2 million

With a Song in My Heart is a 1952 American biographical musical drama film that tells the story of actress and singer Jane Froman, who was crippled by an airplane crash on February 22, 1943, when the Boeing 314 Pan American Clipper flying boat she was on suffered a crash landing in the Tagus River near Lisbon, Portugal. She entertained the troops in World War II despite having to walk with crutches. The film stars Susan Hayward, Rory Calhoun, David Wayne, Thelma Ritter, Robert Wagner, Helen Westcott, and Una Merkel. Froman herself supplied Hayward's singing voice.

The film was written and produced by Lamar Trotti and directed by Walter Lang. The title song, "With a Song in My Heart" (Rodgers and Hart, 1929), became famous in the United Kingdom as the theme to the long-running BBC radio show Family Favourites.

== Plot ==
Jane Froman (Susan Hayward) is a humble staff singer at a Cincinnati radio station, but in no time she rises to the uppermost rungs of network radio fame. Jane gratefully marries her agent Don Ross (David Wayne), but soon both realize they're not truly in love. Jane's popularity soars, and she leaves on a European tour. When her plane crashes, she is partially crippled. Unable to walk without crutches, she nonetheless goes on to entertain U.S. troops during World War II.

== Cast ==
- Susan Hayward as Jane Froman
- Rory Calhoun as John Burn
- David Wayne as Don Ross
- Thelma Ritter as Clancy
- Robert Wagner as GI paratrooper
- Helen Westcott as Jennifer March
- Una Merkel as Sister Marie
- Richard Allan as dancer / tenor
- Max Showalter as Harry Guild
- Ed Oliver as bandleader

Singing groups the Four Girl Friends, the Modernaires, the Melody Men, the Skylarks, and the Starlighters appear in the film.

== Production ==
The rights to Jane Froman's life story were sought by a variety of production companies, including MGM, Warner Bros, Sam Goldwyn, 20th Century Fox, and Wald-Krasna (at RKO). In September 1950 Fox announced that Lamar Trotti would write and produce The Jane Froman Story. Froman says she decided to go with Fox after talking to Trotti even though MGM offered $25,000 more. She says the price paid was "mid six figures".

In March 1951 Fox announced that the male leads would be played by David Wayne and Dale Robertson and that the film would be called I'll See You in My Dreams. In April 1951, Jean Peters was announced as the star. In May, the lead went to Susan Hayward.

The title was changed to You, the Night and the Music. Rory Calhoun replaced Robertson in June.

In July 1951 Robert Wagner was added to the cast.

Joyce MacKenzie was cast as the woman (in reality singer and actress Tamara Drasin, who died in the crash) who took Froman's seat.

Froman acted as technical adviser, but refused to watch the sequence involving the airplane crash.

== Soundtrack recording ==
As per the times, the soundtrack album for With a Song in My Heart was a studio recording, and it initially included eight songs and a shorter version of the "American Medley" sung by Jane Froman, with a short orchestral introduction by George Greeley, who conducted the orchestra and chorus. The Capitol Records album was released in multiple formats: Capitol L-309 (LP), DDN-309 (4-record 78 rpm-box set); KDF-309 (4-record 45 rpm singles box-set); and FBF-309 (2 EP Box-set). This album was the best-selling album of 1952 and spent 25 weeks at the top of the Billboard chart. Jane Froman also released a single of the title song with Capitol Records.

== Reception ==
The film was a box office success. Wagner's small role received a lot of acclaim, resulting in 3,000 fan letters a week arriving at the studio – this encouraged Fox to build him up as a star.

== Accolades ==
Award	Category	Nominee(s)	Result	Ref.
Academy Awards	Best Actress	Susan Hayward	Nominated	
Academy Awards	Best Supporting Actress	Thelma Ritter	Nominated	
Academy Awards	Best Costume Design – Color	Charles LeMaire	Nominated	
Academy Awards	Best Scoring of a Musical Picture	Alfred Newman	Won	
Academy Awards	Best Sound Recording	Thomas T. Moulton	Nominated	
Golden Globe Awards	Best Motion Picture – Musical or Comedy		Won	
Golden Globe Awards	Best Actress in a Motion Picture – Musical or Comedy	Susan Hayward	Won	
Photoplay Awards	Gold Medal		Won	
Photoplay Awards	Most Popular Female Star	Susan Hayward	Won	
Picturegoer Awards	Best Actress	Susan Hayward	Won	
Writers Guild of America Awards	Best Written American Musical	Lamar Trotti	Nominated	

== Soundtrack songs from the film ==
Although the film won the Academy Award for the Best Original Score, there were a number of American standards represented. All except three songs featured the voice of Jane Froman, and were performed by Susan Hayward.

- "Dixie" – 1859 song by Daniel Decatur Emmett
- "With a Song in My Heart" – Music by Richard Rodgers; lyrics by Lorenz Hart
- "Hoe That Corn" – Music by Max Showalter; lyrics by Jack Woodford (performed by Max Showalter and David Wayne)
- "That Old Feeling" – Music by Sammy Fain; lyrics by Lew Brown
- "I'm Through With Love" – Music by Fud Livingston & Matty Malneck; lyrics by Gus Kahn
- "Get Happy" – Music by Harold Arlen; lyrics by Ted Koehler
- "Jim's Toasty Peanuts" – Music and lyrics by Ken Darby
- "The Right Kind" – Music by Alfred Newman; lyrics by Don George & Charles Henderson
- "Montparnasse" – Music by Alfred Newman; lyrics by Eliot Daniel (Sung by David Wayne)
- "Blue Moon" – Music by Richard Rodgers; lyrics by Lorenz Hart
- "On the Gay White Way" – Music by Ralph Rainger; lyrics by Leo Robin
- "Home on the Range" – Music by Daniel E. Kelley; lyrics by Brewster M. Higley
- "Embraceable You" – Music by George Gershwin; lyrics by Ira Gershwin
- "Tea for Two" – Music by Vincent Youmans; lyrics by Irving Caesar
- "It's a Good Day" – Music and lyrics by Peggy Lee and Dave Barbour
- "They're Either Too Young or Too Old" – Music by Arthur Schwartz; lyrics by Frank Loesser
- "I'll Walk Alone" – Music by Jules Styne; lyrics by Sammy Cahn

Songs included in an "American Medley"

- "America the Beautiful" – Music by Samuel A. Ward; lyrics by Katharine Lee Bates
- "Wonderful Home Sweet Home" – Music and lyrics by Ken Darby
- "Give My Regards to Broadway" – Music and lyrics by George M. Cohan
- "Chicago" – Music and lyrics by Fred Fisher
- "California Here I Come" – Music by Joseph Mayer; lyrics by Al Jolson & Buddy G. DeSylva
- "Carry Me Back to Old Virginny" – Music and lyrics by James A. Bland
- "Stein Song" (University of Maine)" – Music and lyrics by E.A. Fenstad & Lincoln Colcord
- "Back Home Again in Indiana" – Music by James F. Hanley; lyrics by Ballard MacDonald
- "Alabamy Bound" – Music by Ray Henderson; lyrics by Bud Green & Buddy G. DeSylva
- "Deep in the Heart of Texas" – Music by Don Swander; lyrics by June Hershey
