= Emily Hall Tremaine =

American art collector and art director (1908–1987)

Emily Hall Tremaine (January 31, 1908 – December 17, 1987) was an American art collector and art director. Tremaine and her husband, Burton G. Tremaine, assembled a major collection of 20th-century modern, Pop, and contemporary art. She also published Apéritif, a society magazine, in the 1930s.

== Early life and career ==
Tremaine was born Emily Hall on January 31, 1908, in Butte, Montana, to William Hubbard Hall, a mining executive, and Elizabeth Smith Hall. Her family moved to Montecito, California, in 1924, and she traveled extensively in Europe, where visits to art museums contributed to her interest in modern art.

In 1928, she married Baron Maximilian von Romberg, a German-born aristocrat. The couple lived in Montecito, where they commissioned architect Lutah Maria Riggs to design their residence, Brünninghausen. Von Romberg died in an airplane accident in 1938. In 1939, Hall married Adolph B. Spreckels Jr., an heir to a sugar fortune; their marriage ended in divorce.

Tremaine began publishing Apéritif, a monthly society magazine, in 1935. The magazine ceased publication the following year. In 1936, she acquired The Black Rose (1927) by Georges Braque, an early major purchase that marked her growing commitment to 20th-century art.

In 1944, Tremaine met industrial executive Burton G. Tremaine, whom she married on May 5, 1945. That year, she became art director at the Miller Company, where she helped develop initiatives connecting modern art with architecture and industrial design.

The Tremaine helped organize Painting Toward Architecture, an exhibition exploring relationships between modern painting and architectural design. First presented at the Wadsworth Atheneum in Hartford, Connecticut, in 1947, the exhibition subsequently traveled to museums and educational institutions across the United States until 1952. The Tremaines also commissioned architects, including Buckminster Fuller, Frank Lloyd Wright, and Philip Johnson, to undertake several projects.

In 1974, the Tremaines allowed Walter De Maria to use land at their Bar T Bar Ranch in Arizona as a testing site for his The Lightning Field project.

Tremaine was a member of the International Council of the Museum of Modern Art, and remained on the council for several years. She was also a member of the Colony Club.

== The Tremaine Collection ==
Following her marriage to Burton Tremaine, the couple began building a collection of modern art that eventually encompassed more than 400 works. Their first major joint acquisition was Piet Mondrian's unfinished paintingVictory Boogie Woogie which they purchased in 1944. Tremaine also acquired works by artists including Joan Miró, Paul Klee, Wassily Kandinsky, and Pablo Picasso.

The Tremaines sought out work by emerging American artists, acquiring paintings and sculptures by Jackson Pollock, Barnett Newman, Franz Kline, Mark Rothko, and Jasper Johns. In 1959, they purchased Johns's Three Flags (1958), which later became one of the most notable works in their collection.

In the early 1960s, the couple began collecting Pop art, acquiring works by Andy Warhol, Roy Lichtenstein, Claes Oldenburg, and James Rosenquist. In 1962, they purchased fifteen works by Warhol, including Marilyn Diptych, Do It Yourself (Violin), Close Cover Before Striking (Pepsi-Cola), 70 S&H Green Stamps, 7 Cent Air Mail, Campbell's Soup Can with Can Opener, Little Campbell's Soup Can (Pepper Pot), Printed Dollar Bill, and Small Blue Flowers. Their early support helped establish a market for artists who had not yet achieved broad institutional recognition.

The Tremaines began selling works from their collection in 1980. Among the notable sales was Warhol's Marilyn Diptych, which entered the collection of Tate in London. In 1981, the Whitney Museum of American Art acquired Johns's Three Flags for $1 million, a record price at the time for a work by a living artist.

Tremaine maintained an active interest in contemporary art and the collection expanded to include works by artists such as Robert Irwin, Christo, and Jean-Michel Basquiat.

In 1984, the Wadsworth Atheneum in Hartford presented The Tremaine Collection: Twentieth Century Masters, The Spirit of Modernism, an exhibition of more than 100 works from the collection. The Tremaines also donated works to museums, including the Wadsworth Atheneum and National Gallery of Art.

== Death ==
Tremaine died at her home in Madison, Connecticut, on December 17, 1987, at the age of 79. She had suffered from emphysema.

== Legacy ==
After her death, the remaining collection was dispersed through auctions at Christie's in New York in 1988 and 1991. Proceeds from the sales helped establish the Emily Hall Tremaine Foundation, which supports initiatives in the arts, education, and other philanthropic fields.

In 1991, the Wadsworth Atheneum in Hartford presented Delaunay to de Kooning: Modern Masters from the Tremaine Collection and the Wadsworth Atheneum, an exhibition featuring works from the Tremaine Collection alongside pieces from the museum's holdings.

Tremaine's papers, including correspondence, artist files, exhibition records, photographs, and biographical materials, are held by the Archives of American Art at the Smithsonian Institution. They were donated in 2005 by Hall Tremaine's step-grandson, Burton G. Tremaine III, and date from c. 1890 to 2004. The collection documents her role in the development of a major private collection of modern and contemporary art.
