= Galeries nationales du Grand Palais =

Museum spaces in the Grand Palais in Paris, France

Coordinates: 48.8666°N 2.3116°E

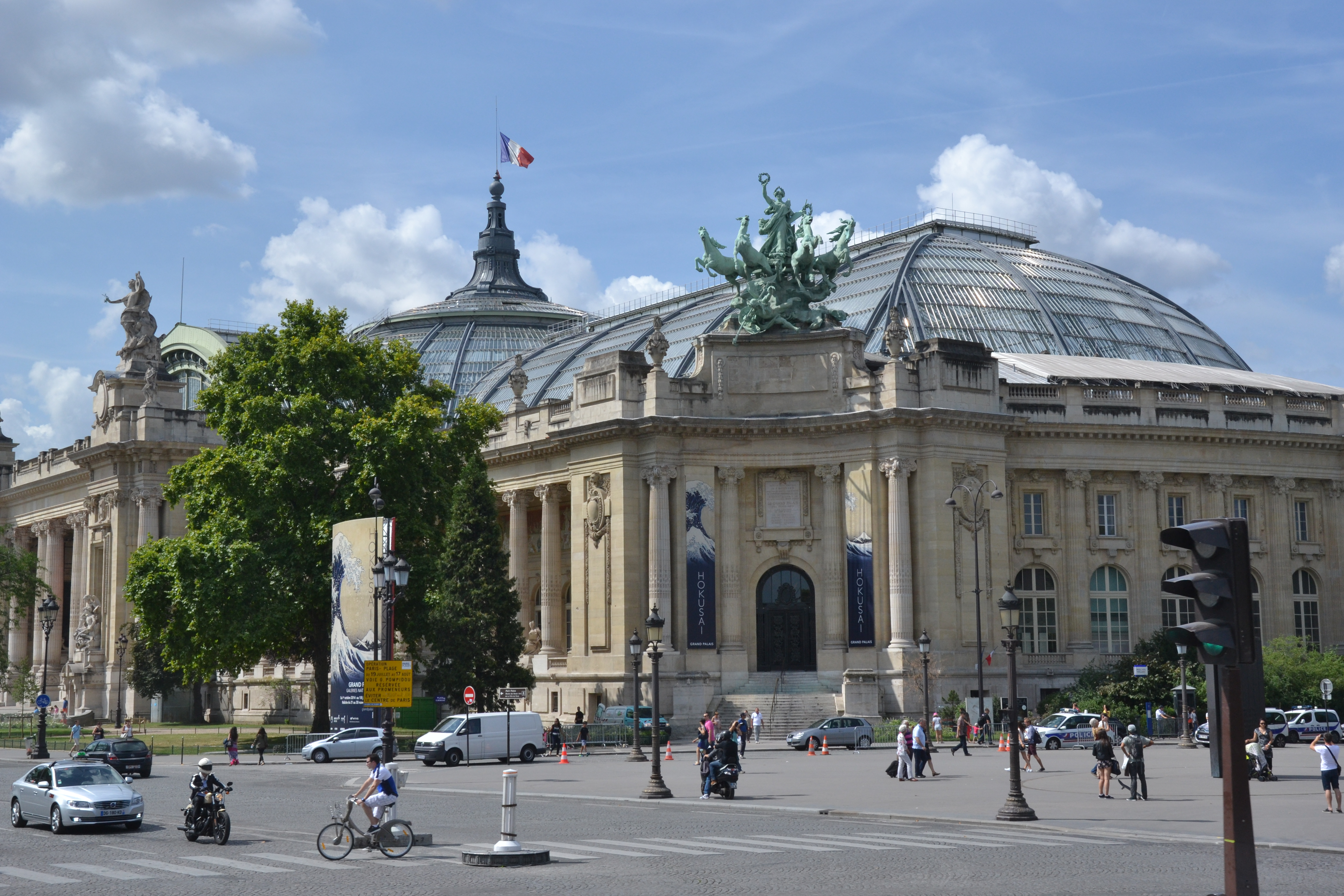
The Grand Palais, which houses the National Galleries

The Galeries nationales du Grand Palais (French pronunciation: [ɡalʁi nɑsjɔnal dy ɡʁɑ̃ palɛ]; transl. Grand Palais National Galleries) are museum spaces located in the Grand Palais in the 8th arrondissement of Paris. They serve as home to major art exhibits and cultural events programmed by the Réunion des musées nationaux et du Grand Palais des Champs-Élysées (RMN), and are open six days a week.

== History ==
In 1964, at the request of André Malraux, then Minister of Cultural Affairs, Reynold Arnould transformed part of the north wing of the Grand Palais into National Galleries intended to host major temporary exhibitions. In 1966, a retrospective of the painter Pablo Picasso and a major presentation of African art were presented.

In 1977–1978, on the occasion of the quadricentenary of the birth of Peter Paul Rubens, the exhibition "The Century of Rubens in French Public Collections" was held.

Numerous exhibitions of classical, Impressionist (Renoir) and modern painters (Zao Wou-Ki, Prassinos, Mušič, Bazaine, Manessier) have been organised there.

== See also ==
- List of museums in Paris
