= Gold Marilyn Monroe =

1962 artwork by Andy Warhol

- Artist: Andy Warhol
- Year: 1962
- Dimensions: 6 ft 11 in (2.11 m) x 4 ft 9 in (1.45 m)
- Location: Museum of Modern Art, New York

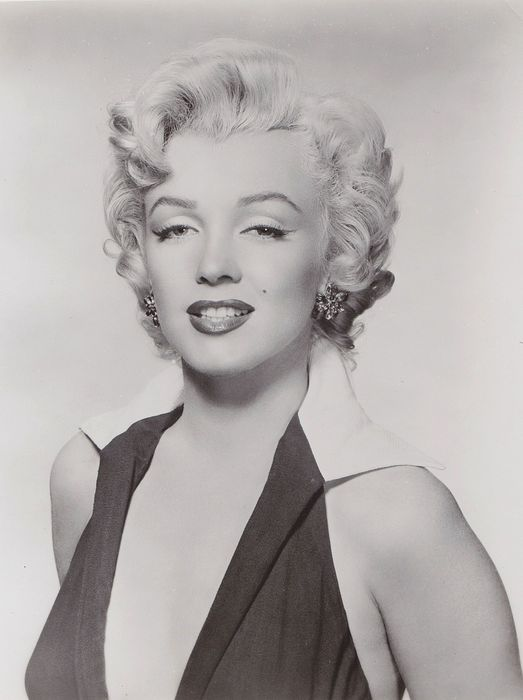
The original 1953 publicity photo

Gold Marilyn Monroe is a screenprint painting by Andy Warhol based on a photograph of the actress Marilyn Monroe's face centered on a large (6 ft 11 in (2.11 m) x 4 ft 9 in (1.45 m)) gold-painted canvas. Warhol used silkscreen ink on synthetic polymer paint on canvas. It was completed in 1962, the same year as Monroe's death. The image of Monroe is a direct copy of a close-up photograph, a publicity still from her 1953 film Niagara.

Gold Marilyn Monroe was included in Warhol's first show in New York, at the Stable Gallery in November 1962, where the architect Philip Johnson bought it. He eventually donated it to the Museum of Modern Art (MoMA) in New York City, where it remains.

Marilyn Diptych was another 1962 work by Warhol featuring 50 repeated images using the same photo, half in bright color and half in blurry black and white. In 1967 Warhol used the same photograph again for his Marilyn Monroe portfolio a set of ten brightly and differently colored screenprints.

== Artistic technique ==
Warhol painted a large canvas a shiny gold color. In the center of the canvas and latex, he silk-screened a black and white photograph of Monroe. He painted her face, hair, and blouse.

== Analysis ==
Art historian Robert Rosenblum was personally close to Warhol and wrote about Warhol's Catholic religious observance, which informed Rosenblum's observation about the 1962 Gold Marilyn in the collection of the Museum of Modern Art:

"When Warhol took a photographic silkscreen of Marilyn Monroe's head, set it on gold paint, and let it float high in a timeless, spaceless heaven ..., he was creating, in effect, a secular saint for the 1960s that might well command as much earthly awe and veneration as, say, a Byzantine Madonna hovering for eternity on a gold mosaic ground."
