= Paint by number =

Painting made by filling numbers provided on the canvas

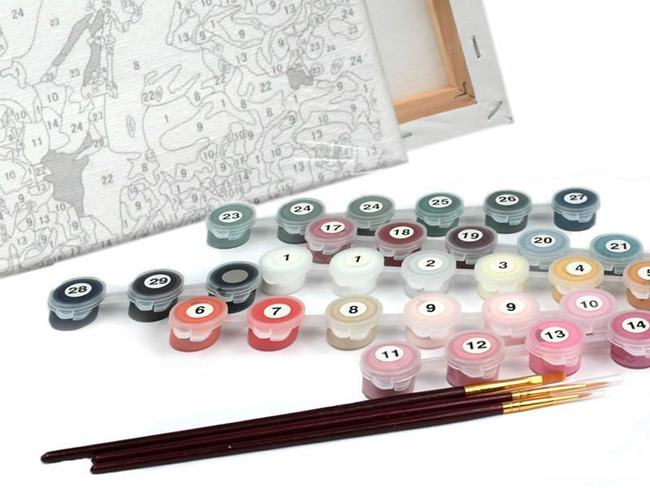
A paint-by-number kit

Paint by number or painting by numbers kits are self-contained painting sets, designed to facilitate painting a pre-designed image. They generally include brushes, tubs of paint with numbered labels, and a canvas printed with borders and numbers. The user selects the color corresponding to one of the numbers then uses it to fill in a delineated section of the canvas, in a manner similar to a coloring book.

The kits were invented and developed in the late-1940s and 1950s by Max S. Klein, an engineer and owner of the Palmer Paint Company in Detroit, Michigan, United States, and Dan Robbins, a commercial artist.

When Palmer Paint introduced crayons to consumers, they also posted images online for a "Crayon by Number" version. In 1955 alone, Americans purchased more than $20 million worth of paint by number kits. The therapeutic benefits of paint by number kits have been widely reported.

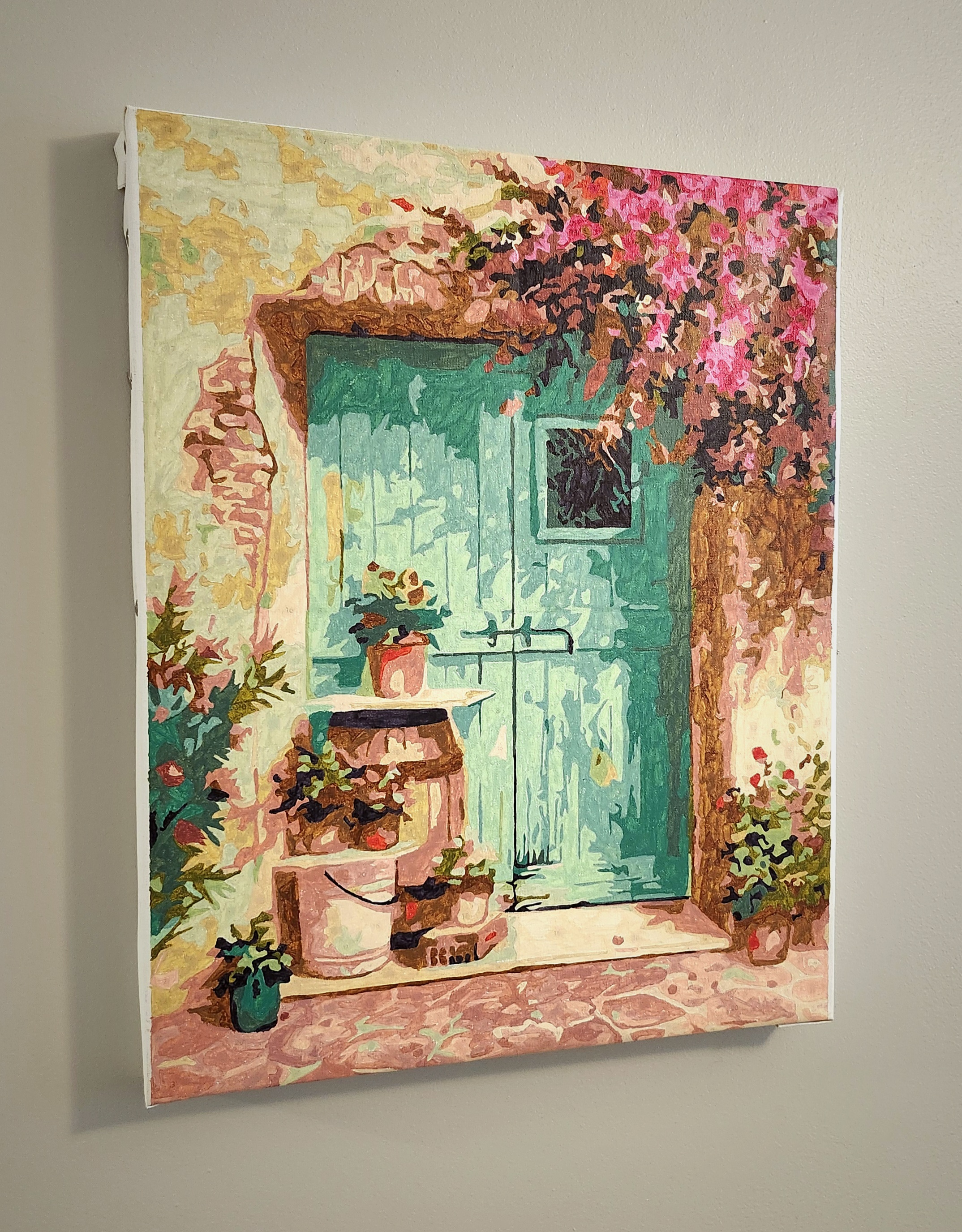
A completed paint-by-number painting

== History ==
The first patent for the paint-by-number technique was filed in 1923. Paint by Number in its popular form was created by the Palmer Show Card Paint Company. The owner of the company approached employee Dan Robbins with the idea for the project. After several iterations of the product, the company in 1951 introduced the Craft Master brand, which went on to sell over 12 million kits. This public response induced other companies to produce their own versions of painting by number. The Craft Master paint kit box tops proclaimed, "A BEAUTIFUL OIL PAINTING THE FIRST TIME YOU TRY."

Following the death of Max Klein in 1993, his daughter Jacquelyn Schiffman donated the Palmer Paint Co. archives to the Smithsonian Museum of American History. The archival materials have been placed in the museum's Archives Center where they have been designated collection #544, the "Paint by Number Collection".

In 1992, Michael O'Donoghue and Trey Speegle organized and mounted a show of O'Donoghue's paint-by-number collection in New York City at the Bridgewater/Lustberg Gallery. After O'Donoghue's death, the Smithsonian Institution's National Museum of American History exhibited many key pieces from O'Donoghue's collection, now owned by Speegle, along with works from other collectors in 2001.

In 2008, a private collector in Massachusetts assembled over 6,000 paint-by-number works dating back to the 1950s from eBay and other American collectors to create the Paint By Number Museum, a registered 501(c)(3) non-profit organization which has become the world's largest online archive of paint-by-number works. The private collector's identity has remained an open question and subject of speculation. In 2011, the Museum of Modern Art in New York accepted four early designs of paint by number by Max S. Klein for its Department of Architecture and Design, donated by Jacquelyn Schiffman.

In 2026, London Zoo celebrated their 200 year anniversary by organising the largest paint by number of all time, with 14,000 people participating.

== See also ==
- Mosaic
- Stained glass
- List of art techniques
