= Niagara (1953 film) =

1953 film by Henry Hathaway

- Theatrical release poster
- Directed by: Henry Hathaway
- Written by: Charles Brackett; Walter Reisch; Richard Breen
- Produced by: Charles Brackett
- Starring: Marilyn Monroe; Joseph Cotten; Jean Peters; Casey Adams; Denis O'Dea; Richard Allan; Don Wilson; Lurene Tuttle; Russell Collins; Will Wright
- Cinematography: Joe MacDonald
- Edited by: Barbara McLean
- Music by: Sol Kaplan
- Distributed by: 20th Century Fox
- Release date: January 21, 1953
- Running time: 88 minutes
- Countries: United States and Canada
- Language: English
- Budget: $1.7 million
- Box office: $2.5 million

Niagara is a 1953 American noir thriller film directed by Henry Hathaway and produced by Charles Brackett. Brackett also wrote the screenplay alongside Walter Reisch and Richard Breen. Among the top-billed stars are Marilyn Monroe, Joseph Cotten, and Jean Peters. Denis O'Dea, and Max Showalter (credited as Casey Adams) are among other stars appearing in the film. Set in Niagara Falls, Ontario, Canada, the film tells the story of two couples: one, a pair of newlyweds on their honeymoon, and the other, a husband and wife whose turbulent marriage is wracked by jealousy and deceit.

Unlike other films noir of the time, which were typically black-and-white, Niagara was shot in "three-strip" Technicolor (one of the last films to be made at 20th Century Fox in that format, as a few months later the studio began converting to CinemaScope, which had compatibility problems with three-strip but not with Eastmancolor).

Niagara was a box office success and received positive reviews from film critics. It was one of 20th Century Fox's biggest box office hits that year. Monroe was given top billing in Niagara, which elevated her to movie star status. A publicity photograph of Monroe for the film was used as the basis of artist Andy Warhol's famous Marilyn Diptych (1962).

== Plot ==
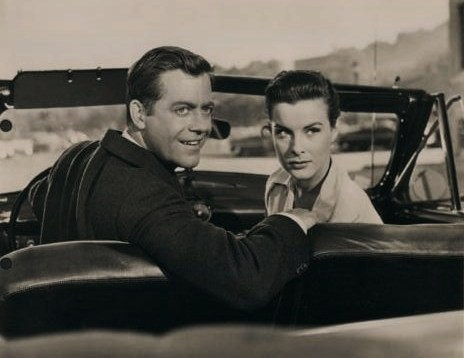
Ray (Max Showalter, credited as Casey Adams) and Polly Cutler (Jean Peters)

Ray and Polly Cutler arrive at Niagara Falls for a long-delayed honeymoon. Their reserved cabin is occupied by another couple, George and Rose Loomis. When the cabin owner, Mr. Qua, asks Rose to check out, she tells them that George is asleep and is not quite himself, having been recently discharged from an Army mental hospital after serving in the Korean War. The Cutlers politely accept another cabin.

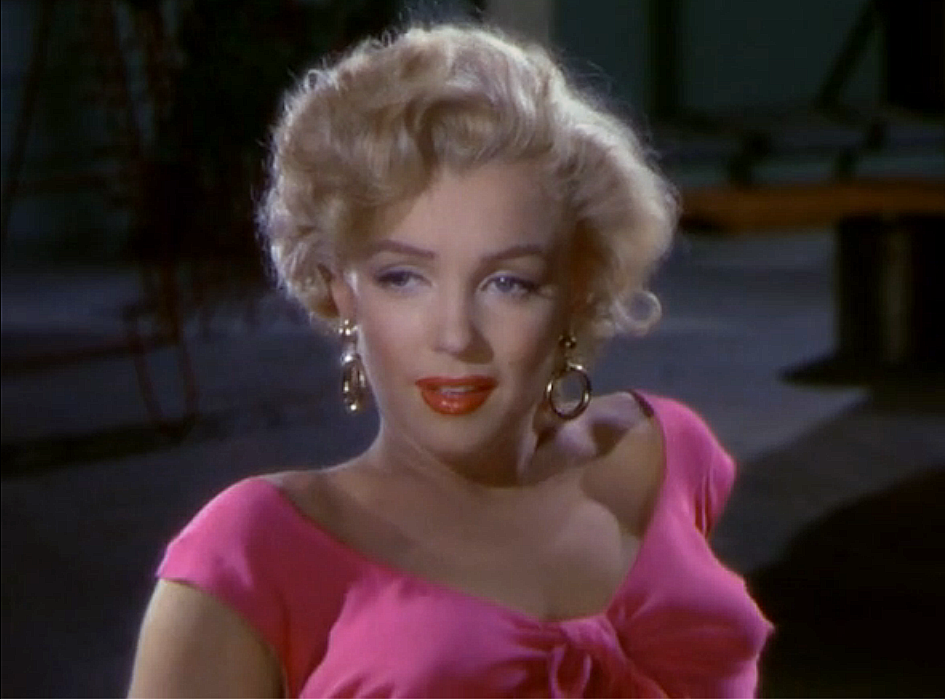
Rose Loomis (Marilyn Monroe)

As the two couples become more acquainted, Ray and Polly learn that George and Rose have a troubled marriage. She is younger and seductively attractive. He is jealous, depressed and irritable. While touring the falls the following day, Polly sees Rose kissing her lover, Ted. That evening, Rose joins an impromptu outdoor party and requests that a record of her favorite song, "Kiss", be played. George storms out of their cabin and breaks the record, suspecting the song has a secret meaning for Rose. Polly visits his room to bandage his cut hand. George confides that his luck turned for the worse after he married Rose, who was a barmaid when they met.

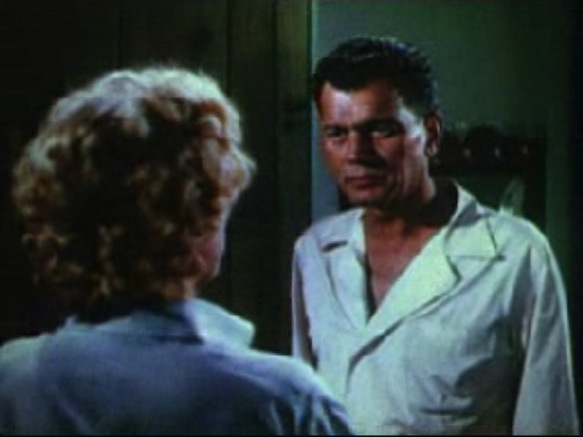
George Loomis (Joseph Cotten)

Rose and Ted conspire to kill George. Ted tells Rose that when the job is done, the Rainbow Tower bells will play "Kiss". Rose lures George into following her through the dark tourist tunnel underneath the falls, where Ted waits to kill him. Rose returns to the cabins, where she asks Ray and Polly if they have seen George. They go together to the scenic tunnel office, which points out that George never came back to exchange his rented rain boots for his shoes. A police search is launched. Rose hears her song being played by the bell tower, indicating that her plan was successful. A body is found, and Rose is brought to the morgue to identify the body. When she sees its face, she passes out and is admitted to the hospital.

While Ray is out, Polly learns that their things have been moved into the cabin that they originally reserved. Polly takes a nap and wakes up to see a spiteful George, who runs away. Ray dismisses the episode as a nightmare. The Cutlers visit the falls with Ray's boss, Mr. Kettering. While Polly is alone, George appears and follows her. Trying to escape, she slips against a broken handrail and George saves her from falling. He explains that he killed Ted in self-defense and collected Ted's shoes to fake his own death. Polly tells the inspector that George is alive and the police launch a dragnet. George has the carillon play "Kiss" again to taunt Rose, who flees the hospital and goes to the train station. Finding George waiting there, she flees and tries to hide in the bell tower. George catches and strangles her. He is trapped in the building until a maintenance worker unlocks the door.

The Cutlers go fishing with Mr. Kettering and his wife in a launch on the Niagara River above the falls. They moor the speedboat in Chippawa to pick up gasoline and other supplies. Polly returns while George is in the process of hot-wiring the boat. The boatman reports the stolen boat and the police set out in pursuit before George can cross the border. Polly tells him to give himself up, as he only killed Ted in self-defense, but he reveals that he has killed Rose. The boat soon runs out of gas and floats towards the falls, which the police boats are unable to approach. As they near the edge, George scuttles the boat to try to ground it. It slows down enough for him to help Polly climb onto a rock, but he remains aboard the boat as he is carried over the falls to his death. Polly is rescued by helicopter and reunites with Ray.

== Cast ==
- Marilyn Monroe as Rose Loomis
- Joseph Cotten as George Loomis
- Jean Peters as Polly Cutler
- Max Showalter as Ray Cutler (credited as Casey Adams)
- Denis O'Dea as Inspector Starkey
- Richard Allan as Ted Patrick
- Don Wilson as Mr. Kettering
- Lurene Tuttle as Mrs. Kettering
- Russell Collins as Mr. Qua
- Will Wright as boat owner

== Production ==
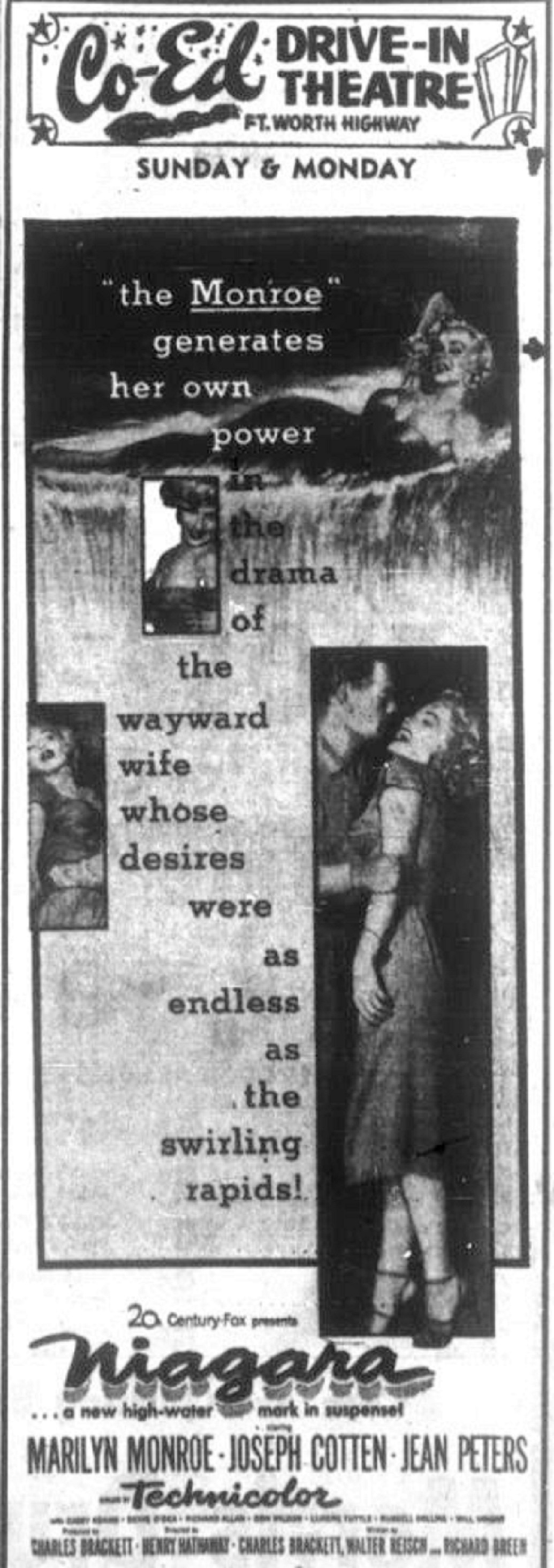
Drive-in advertisement from 1953

Walter Reisch said producer Charles Brackett wanted to make a film set around Niagara Falls and Reisch suggested it be a murder mystery. Reisch said,

Anybody hearing the name Niagara thinks of honeymoon couples and of some sentimental story of a girl walking out on her husband on their wedding night and their getting together again. It would be foolish to start up with Sonja Henie tricks here or Esther Williams-type swimming extravaganzas. I would like to make it a mystery story, with a real murder in it.

Reisch said he came up with the story but wrote the script with Richard Breen and Brackett. Head of Fox Darryl F. Zanuck wanted to cast Monroe in the film. According to Reisch,

we thought that was a nice idea, until there came a second telephone call that he wanted her to be the villainess, not the girl... My God! Here was the prettiest girl in the whole United States of America! But he insisted it was a great idea, so we finally did it. We didn't know whether she would like it, but she had no objection, whatsoever—on the contrary.

Peters replaced Anne Baxter in the role of Polly. Shooting of Niagara took place from early June to mid-July 1952. Peters' character was initially the leading role, but the film eventually became a vehicle for Monroe, who was by that time more successful. Reisch states that there are "major sequences missing" from the final film:

After he'd seen it, Zanuck simply couldn't accept the fact that the police at Niagara Falls were of Canadian extraction. We had British actors playing Canadian police commissioners and detectives and various cops, and he just abhorred it. He wouldn't let us go back to the stages to finish it or to repair it—no, he just took it out! The American audience, he said, does not know, does not understand, that the Niagara Falls are bisected by the border ... and we should have used Americans. And [director Henry] Hathaway, who didn't like the idea either, sided with him. So there are big holes in the story.

Henry Hathaway said the film would have been better had his original choice James Mason played the lead male role. He says Mason was going to play the role but his daughter was sick of seeing him die in movies so the actor turned the role down. Hathaway stated that "Cotten's a good actor but doesn't have the smouldering edge that Mason has; he's a little flat."

"Kiss" was composed by Lionel Newman, with lyrics by Haven Gillespie—both of whom are uncredited—and performed by Monroe.

== Critical reception ==
Upon the film's release, A. W. of The New York Times praised the film, if not the acting, writing,

Obviously ignoring the idea that there are Seven Wonders of the World, Twentieth Century-Fox has discovered two more and enhanced them with Technicolor in Niagara... For the producers are making full use of both the grandeur of the Falls and its adjacent areas as well as the grandeur that is Marilyn Monroe... Perhaps Miss Monroe is not the perfect actress at this point. But neither the director nor the gentlemen who handled the cameras appeared to be concerned with this. They have caught every possible curve both in the intimacy of the boudoir and in equally revealing tight dresses. And they have illustrated pretty concretely that she can be seductive—even when she walks. As has been noted, Niagara may not be the place to visit under these circumstances but the falls and Miss Monroe are something to see.

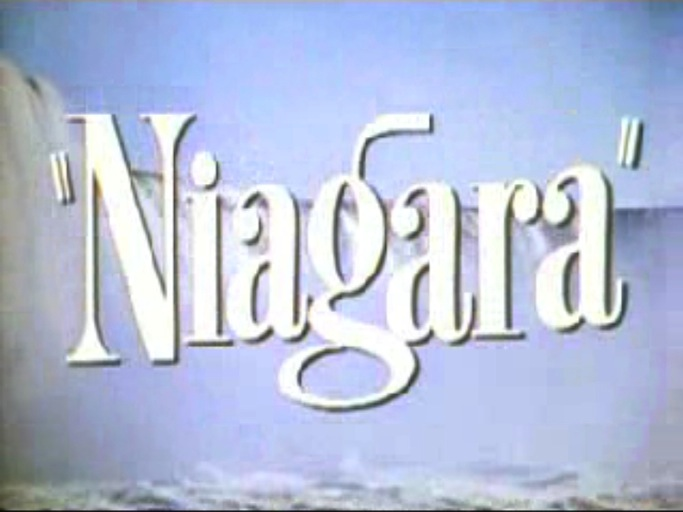
Opening title from film's trailer, which differs from that seen in the film

Also in 1953, a reviewer at Variety wrote,

Niagara is a morbid, clichéd expedition into lust and murder. The atmosphere throughout is strained and taxes the nerves with a feeling of impending disaster. Focal point of all this is Marilyn Monroe, who's vacationing at the Falls with hubby Joseph Cotten.... The camera lingers on Monroe's sensuous lips, roves over her slip-clad figure and accurately etches the outlines of her derrière as she weaves down a street to a rendezvous with her lover. As a contrast to the beauty of the female form is another kind of nature's beauty—that of the Falls. The natural phenomena have been magnificently photographed on location.

Later critics have also praised the film. In 2001, Robert Weston wrote,

Niagara is a good movie for noir fans who crave something a little different. Be warned, the film was shot in glorious Technicolor, not black and white, but still boasts an ample share of shadows and style.... Undoubtedly, the best reason to see Niagara is just as trailer promised: for the scenery. There's some terrific location work that showcases the breathtaking aspects of the Falls before the city evolved into a tawdry Canadian answer to Atlantic City; and of course, there's a gal named Marilyn Monroe, burgeoning at her humble beginnings.

On the review aggregator website Rotten Tomatoes, the film holds an approval rating of 78% based on 23 reviews, with an average rating of 6.6/10. Metacritic, which uses a weighted average, assigned the film a score of 70 out of 100, based on 11 critics, indicating "generally favorable" reviews.

== Noir themes ==
A major theme is that of sex and its destructiveness. Rose is a femme fatale, seductively dressed in tight clothes revealing her sensual figure. Her relationship (combining the sexual, hypocritical, and scornful) with George is contrasted with the more normal relationship of the Cutlers, which also has sexual elements hinted at by the film. Ray Cutler does not fail to notice Rose's sexual charms, but his and Polly's reactions to their interactions with George and Rose demonstrate the conventionality of their attitudes.

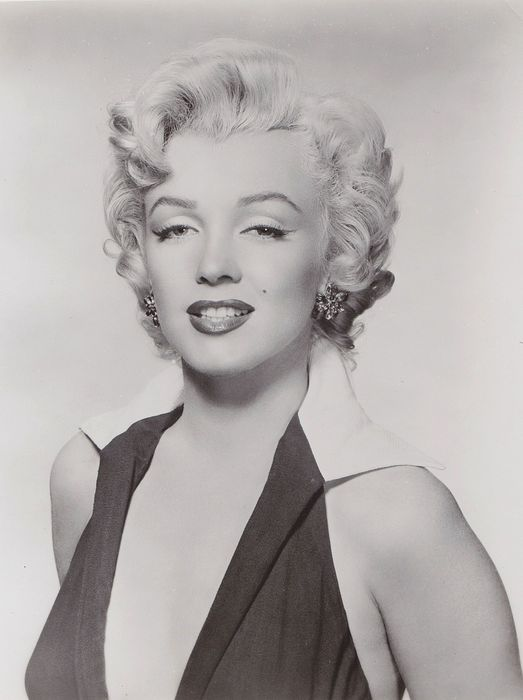
Promotional photo later used by Andy Warhol

== Legacy ==
Monroe's top billing in Niagara elevated her to movie star status. Her next two films, Gentlemen Prefer Blondes and How to Marry a Millionaire (both 1953), were even bigger commercial successes.

In the weeks after Monroe's death in August 1962, Andy Warhol used a publicity photo from Niagara as the basis for his silkscreen painting Marilyn Diptych.
