= Popism =

1980 memoir by Andy Warhol

POPism: The Warhol '60s
- First edition cover
- Author: Andy Warhol & Pat Hackett
- Language: English
- Publisher: Harcourt Brace Jovanovich
- Publication date: 1980
- Publication place: United States
- Media type: Print
- Pages: 310
- ISBN: 978-0-15-173095-7

POPism: The Warhol '60s is a 1980 memoir by American artist Andy Warhol, written in collaboration with writer Pat Hackett. It was published by Harcourt Brace Jovanovich in March 1980. Covering the period from 1960 to 1969, the book recounts Warhol's emergence as a leading figure of the Pop art movement, the development of his silkscreen paintings and experimental films, and the social and artistic milieu surrounding his studio, the Factory. Drawing on Warhol's recollections and interviews Hackett conducted with people from his circle, the book chronicles Warhol's superstars and members of the Velvet Underground, as well as events surrounding Warhol's 1968 shooting.

== Summary ==
Beginning in 1960, Popism follows Andy Warhol's emergence as a leading figure of the Pop Art movement, from his landmark exhibition of Campbell's Soup Can paintings in 1962 and his development of silkscreen paintings depicting Marilyn Monroe, Elvis Presley, and Elizabeth Taylor to the establishment of his studio, the Factory, as a gathering place for artists, writers, performers, and musicians of New York's downtown cultural scene. As the decade progresses, the book documents Warhol's transition into filmmaking and his growing circle of Warhol superstars, including Taylor Mead, Baby Jane Holzer, Edie Sedgwick, Ondine, Viva, and Candy Darling. It also recounts the activities surrounding his underground films, including Sleep, Chelsea Girls, and Flesh, and the Factory's connections to the Velvet Underground.

The narrative reaches the attempt on Warhol's life in 1968 and continues through 1969, recounting Warhol and director Paul Morrissey's unsuccessful attempt to develop a film with Columbia Pictures, their encounter with the emerging New Hollywood during a trip to Los Angeles, and the changing atmosphere of the Factory. The book concludes with Morrissey's proposal for Trash, a film intended to portray drug use without the romanticism that Warhol felt characterized its depiction in movies.

== Writing and collaboration ==
Warhol collaborated with writer Pat Hackett on Popism, which Hackett wrote based on interviews with members of Warhol's circle and on conversations with Warhol himself. Hackett later recalled that Warhol gave her specific instructions for the book, telling her to interview one person from each period or scene and incorporate their recollections into his narrative voice. She said that much of the book also drew on Warhol's own recollections of the 1960s, which she had previously recorded in conversation with him. Warhol read the manuscript closely and approved its contents. According to Hackett, he regarded differing recollections of events as equally valid, sometimes telling her to include an anecdote even when he could not personally confirm that it had occurred: "If they said I did, put it in." Hackett described the finished book as a blend of Warhol's recollections and those of the people who had lived through the 1960s with him, with Warhol's approval throughout.

== Publication ==
Popsim was published by Harcourt Brace Jovanovich in March 1980. Bob Colacello, editor of Interview magazine, hosted a dinner party for the launch of the book at La Boite in New York City on March 24, 1980. The guests included Henry Geldzahler, Ahmet Ertegun, Richard Gere, Sylvester Stallone, Bianca Jagger, Debbie Harry, and Paloma Picasso.

To coincide with the release of the Edie Sedgwick biopic Factory Girl (2006), Harvest Books—an imprint of Harcourt—issued a new edition of the book in 2006. In 2007, another edition was published by Penguin Modern Classics along with an Ebook.

== Reception ==
Ben Pleasants of the Los Angeles Times noted that "'Popism: The Warhol '60s is not a book about turbulence in America, or upheaval in our cities or even experimentation in the arts; instead, it focuses on the chic gossip of the art crowd of Manhattan during that era."

David Dawson of the Gannett News Service wrote: "He does not deeply analyze himself or his movement, but the narration eventually piles up a definition of Popism as celebration of the most silly and least enduring parts of culture. … In a time of examination of the 1960s, this book is an interesting account of the alternative culture that wasn't remembered. The treatment is superficial, but I think that's the point."

The Miami Herald's Helen L. Kohen wrote: "The essence of Warhol's popism is disintegration, followed immediately by boredom. Though that is not a promising outline for a book, Warhol tackles it, and we must admit the boredom does succeed."

Thomas Sabulis wrote for The Boston Globe: "It's gossipy and alive, one of the best things you'll ever read about those crazy eight years—Warhol says the '60s ended in 1968. It's a Pop history in wraparound sunglasses and it reads like a dream."
