= Campbell's Soup Cans (disambiguation) =

Campbell's Soup Cans is the first (1962) of a series of works of art by Andy Warhol.

Campbell's Soup Cans may also refer to:

- Campbell's Soup Cans II, another (1969) Warhol work in the series
- Campbell's Soup Cans I an alternate referent to Campbell's Soup I, another (1968) Warhol work in the series
- Colored Campbell's Soup Cans by Warhol (1965)
- Soup cans produced by the Campbell's
