= Self-Portraits (Warhol series) =

1966–67 series by Andy Warhol

Self-Portrait
- Artist: Andy Warhol
- Year: 1966
- Medium: Silkscreen ink on synthetic polymer paint on nine canvases
- Movement: Pop Art
- Owner: Museum of Modern Art, New York

Self-Portrait is a series of silkscreen paintings created by the American artist Andy Warhol between 1966 and 1967. The works marked Warhol's return to self-portraiture after more than two years devoted primarily to his Flowers paintings, Brillo Box sculptures, and underground films.

== Background ==
Beginning with self-portraits he drew as a teenager in the 1940s, Pop artist Andy Warhol depicted himself on several occasions throughout his career. In 1963, he posed for a series of photographs in a photo booth, using one of the resulting strips as the basis for his Self-Portraits (1963–64). Warhol later recalled in his memoir POPism: The Warhol '60s that the idea for his first self-portraits originated in 1964 during a conversation with filmmaker Ivan Karp. Warhol recalled that Karp told him, "You know, people want to see you. Your looks are responsible for a certain part of your fame—they feed the imagination." He credited this suggestion with inspiring his first self-portraits.

By 1966, Warhol had become one of the most recognizable contemporary artists in the United States. His growing public profile coincided with renewed interest in his own image, which had become inseparable from his public persona. He created a new series of self-portraits between 1966 and 1967.

== Description ==
The series is based on a photograph of Warhol gazing directly at the camera while holding two fingers to his lips in a contemplative pose. The works marked a new development in his portraiture through their increased use of garish, bold color and their avoidance of conventional flesh tones. Although some versions were printed in black on a silver background, most were rendered in vividly saturated hues reminiscent of his 1965 "fauve" Campbell's Soup Cans. The bold colors simultaneously draw attention to the face while obscuring many of Warhol's recognizable features.

== Interpretation ==
Art critic David Bourdon compared the series to the "'fauve' soup-can paintings" from 1965. He argued that the self-portraits reveal little about Warhol's "physiognomy or his psychological state; instead, they present him as a detached, shadowy, and elusive voyeur. They exemplified his ability to manipulate his public image, one of the recurring themes of his art. There he was in a variety of psychedelic color combinations, none of them naturalistic, and larger than life, yet often so abstract as to be difficult to recognize. The lurid, arbitrary hues suggest a chameleon personality—or a mutating persona—that assumes the coloration of its background. Andy appeared, in fact, to be hiding behind a camouflage of brilliant color."

== Exhibitons ==
The self-portraits were first exhibited publicly in October 1966 as part of a major survey of Warhol's work at the Institute of Contemporary Art in Boston. The exhibition included works from several series, including Campbell's Soup Cans, Flowers, Death and Disaster, Silver Clouds, Cow wallpaper, and two dozen of the new Self-Portraits.

In 1967, the portraits were included in the exhibition at the United States Pavilion at Expo 67 in Montreal.

Paintings from the 1966–67 Self-Portraits series have since been included in retrospectives on Warhol's career.

== Collections ==
Works from the Self-Portrait series are held in the collections of several major museums, including the Museum of Modern Art in New York City, the Art Institute of Chicago in Chicago, and The Broad in Los Angeles.

== In pop culture ==
In 1971, Warhol's Self-Portrait (1967), was featured on the cover of Bulletin of The Detroit Institute of Arts.

Self-Portrait has been used as the artwork for several books about Warhol and art, including his own POPism: The Warhol '60s (1980), and The Andy Warhol Diaries (1989).

This catalogue published in conjunction with the 2012 exhibition Regarding Warhol: Sixty Artists, Fifty Years at the Metropolitan Museum of Art uses two different Self-Portrait (1967) portraits for the front and back cover.
