= Alan's Psychedelic Breakfast =

Instrumental by Pink Floyd

from the album Atom Heart Mother
- Published: World Copyrights
- Released: 2 October 1970 (UK); 10 October 1970 (US)
- Recorded: 18 June, 10–21 July 1970
- Studio: Abbey Road, London
- Genre: Progressive rock; art rock; musique concrète; ambient; psychedelia
- Length: 13:00
- Label: Harvest
- Songwriters: Nick Mason, David Gilmour, Roger Waters, Richard Wright
- Producers: Pink Floyd, Norman Smith (executive producer)

Official audio
- "Alan's Psychedelic Breakfast" on YouTube

"Alan's Psychedelic Breakfast" is the fifth and final track from the 1970 Pink Floyd album Atom Heart Mother, credited to the whole group. It is a three-part instrumental.

== Recording and sounds ==
The track features Pink Floyd playing in the background as Pink Floyd roadie Alan Styles (1936–2012) speaks about the breakfast he is preparing and eating, as well as breakfasts he has had in the past ("Breakfast in Los Angeles. Microbiotic stuff..."). There are significant breaks before the first and in between all three instrumental parts where only Alan's muttering and movements, with occasional exterior background noise, are heard. Much of Alan's speech is overdubbed throughout the piece in gradually fading echoes. For example, "Microbiotic stuff" is repeated every couple of seconds, more quietly each time. It was performed live three times in the United Kingdom during the winter of 1970.

In addition to the talking, the sounds of Alan making breakfast—such as lighting the stove, cooking bacon, pouring milk and cereal (which makes a popping sound associated with Kellogg's Rice Krispies), loudly gulping and drinking, and loudly and vigorously eating cereal—are clearly audible in the background, which adds a conceptual feel to the track. Alan can be heard entering the kitchen and gathering supplies at the start of the track, and washing up and exiting the kitchen at the end; a dripping tap can be heard during both of these instances. On some copies of the vinyl version, the dripping tap at the end of the song is cut into the run-off groove, so it plays on infinitely until the listener removes the stylus from the album. On the CD and digital release, the dripping continues for approximately 17 seconds after all other sounds have ceased.

== Sections ==
=== Rise and Shine (0:00-3:33) ===
This piece consists of two pianos, bass, Hammond organ, a steel guitar fed through a Leslie speaker and hi-hats.

During the opening of this section, Alan can be heard muttering to himself, deciding what to have as he begins to prepare his breakfast. He can be heard saying the following: "Oh... Er... Me flakes... Scrambled eggs, bacon, sausages, tomatoes, toast, coffee... Marmalade, I like marmalade... Yes, porridge is nice, any cereal... I like all cereals... Oh, God. Kickoff is 10am." At the end of this section, the sound of a whistling kettle can be heard as the music stops.

=== Sunny Side Up (3:33-7:45) ===
This piece takes the form of a modified fugue, and was written and performed entirely by David Gilmour on two acoustic guitars and a steel guitar.

=== Morning Glory (7:45-13:00) ===
This piece was performed by the entire band. The main instrument is Richard Wright's piano, which was overdubbed three different times (one in the left channel, one in the centre, and one in the right channel). The piece also features very prominent bass, electric guitar, ADTed drums, and Hammond organ. At the end, after saying "All my head's a blank", Alan picks up his car keys and leaves via the door. Faintly, a car can be heard starting and driving away.

== Reception ==
In a review for the Atom Heart Mother album, Alec Dubro of Rolling Stone described "Alan's Psychedelic Breakfast" as "the only redeeming feature on [side 2 of Atom Heart Mother], but only partially so." Dubro found "the integrated Arising and Breakfast sounds" as the redeeming factor, not the music in the track itself. In his 1997 History of Progressive Rock, Paul Stump assessed the morning sounds as "nothing more than a reportage of events" with no meaningful integration into the piece's musical language. He also remarked that as an experiment into the use of noise as music, "Alan's Psychedelic Breakfast" does nothing that composers such as Morton Subotnick, John Cage, and Karlheinz Stockhausen had not done before. In a less-than-enthusiastic review, Stephen Deusner of Paste described "Alan's Psychedelic Breakfast" as "a cut-and-paste assemblage of sounds that never coalesces into much of anything." Because Deusner enjoyed "If" and "Fat Old Sun", he was disappointed Pink Floyd ended Atom Heart Mother with this track. In another review for the Atom Heart Mother album, Irving Tan of Sputnikmusic described the track as an 'incredibly effective form of "wallpaper music'". However, Tan also described the track as not so much a "song", but rather an ambient psychedelic sketch.

In 2018, Ultimate Classic Rock contributor Bryan Wawzenek ranked the piece among Pink Floyd's worst songs, deeming it to be a "13-minute slab of musique concrete fulfills a request that (probably) no Floyd fan ever made: 'What does roadie Alan Styles like for breakfast, can we hear him making it and could the guys in the band noodle around (in a very non-psychedelic manner) as he fries bacon, muses about marmalade and pours a bowl of Rice Krispies?'. Vulture writer Bill Wyman deemed the suite to be another from the band's "dreariest period", but said: "The argument for this junk, I suppose, is that the band, despite its space-rock leanings, was much more down to earth and organic, as opposed to the flights of high electronic fantasy offered by your King Crimsons and the other, more energetic progressive-rock outfits of the time." However, he still criticised the anonymity of the musicians, saying: "If this is supposed to be organic, there’s no personality to the music."

The song's experimentation with everyday sounds (musique concrète influence) inadvertently created an ASMR-like experience. As a 2024 review on Cult Following notes, Pink Floyd’s "swift experimentation" led to sounds that later resonated with ASMR audiences.

== Personnel ==
- David Gilmour – steel, acoustic and electric guitars
- Roger Waters – tape effects, tape collage, bass guitar
- Richard Wright – piano, Hammond organ
- Nick Mason – drums, percussion, tape edits, tape collage, additional engineering

with:

- Alan Styles – voice, sound effects

== Cultural references ==
- The album The Dark Side of the Moog V (1996) by Klaus Schulze and Pete Namlook is subtitled "Psychedelic Brunch".
- Jam band The Breakfast (founded as Psychedelic Breakfast in 1998) have taken their name from the song.
