= Atom Heart Mother =

Studio album by Pink Floyd
- Released: 2 October 1970
- Recorded: 1 March – 26 July 1970
- Studios: EMI, London
- Genres: Progressive rock; experimental rock
- Length: 52:06
- Label: Harvest
- Producer: Pink Floyd

Pink Floyd chronology
Ummagumma (1969)	Atom Heart Mother (1970)	The Best of the Pink Floyd (1970)

Atom Heart Mother is the fifth studio album by the English rock band Pink Floyd. It was released by Harvest on 2 October 1970 in the United Kingdom, and on 10 October 1970 in the United States. It was recorded at EMI Studios (now Abbey Road Studios) in London, and was the band's first album to reach number 1 in the UK, while it reached number 55 in the US, eventually going gold there.

The cover was designed by Hipgnosis, and was the band's first not to feature their name, or have photographs of them on any part of it. This was a trend that would continue on subsequent covers throughout the 1970s. The cover shows a Holstein cow on a meadow landscape.

Although it was commercially successful on release, the band – particularly Roger Waters and David Gilmour – have expressed negative opinions of the album. A remastered CD was released in 1994 in the UK and the US, and again in 2011. Ron Geesin, who had influenced and collaborated with Waters, co-composed the title track.

== Recording ==
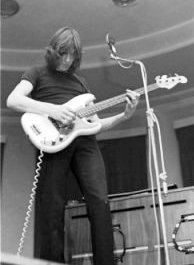
Roger Waters onstage at Leeds University, 28 February 1970. One of the earliest live performances of the album's title track was at this show.

Pink Floyd started work on the album after completing their contributions to the soundtrack for the film Zabriskie Point in Rome, which had ended somewhat acrimoniously. They headed back to London in early 1970 for rehearsals. A number of out-takes from the Rome sessions were used to assemble new material during these rehearsals, though some of it, such as "The Violent Sequence", later to become "Us and Them", would not be used for some time.

== Songs ==
=== Side one ===
The title track of Atom Heart Mother resulted from a number of instrumental figures the band had composed during these rehearsals, including the chord progression of the main theme, which guitarist David Gilmour had called "Theme from an Imaginary Western", and the earliest documented live performance was on 17 January 1970 at Hull University. The band felt that the live performances developed the piece into a manageable shape. Recording of the track commenced at EMI Studios (now Abbey Road Studios) in London, and was somewhat cumbersome, as it was the first recording to use a new eight-track one-inch tape and EMI TG12345 transistorised mixing console (8-track, 24-microphone inputs) in the studio. As a result, EMI insisted the band were not allowed to do any splicing of the tape to edit pieces together. Consequently, band members Roger Waters and Nick Mason had little choice but to play the bass and drums, respectively, for the entire 23-minute piece in one sitting. The other instruments the band played were overdubbed later. Mason recalled the final backing track's lack of precise timekeeping would cause problems later on. Geesin denied Mason's account and said the tapes given to him for arranging the score were a collage of short sections.

By March, they had finished recording the track, but felt that it was rather unfocused and needed something else. The band had been introduced to Ron Geesin via the Rolling Stones tour manager, Sam Cutler, and were impressed with his composition and tape-editing capabilities, particularly Waters and Mason. Geesin was handed the completed backing tracks the band had recorded, and asked to compose an orchestral arrangement over the top of it while the band went on tour to the US. Geesin described the composing and arranging as "a hell of a lot of work. Nobody knew what was wanted, they couldn't read music …" According to him, Gilmour came up with some of the melodic lines, while the pair of them along with keyboardist Richard Wright worked on the middle section with the choir. During the recording of his work in June with the EMI Pops Orchestra, the session musicians present were unimpressed with his tendency to favour avant-garde music over established classical works, and, combined with the relative difficulty of some of the parts, harassed him during recording. John Alldis, whose choir was also to perform on the track, had experience in dealing with orchestral musicians, and managed to conduct the recorded performance in place of Geesin.

The track was originally called "The Amazing Pudding", although Geesin's original score referred to it as "Untitled Epic". A refined and improved version (with Geesin's written parts) was played at Bath Festival of Blues and Progressive Music on 27 June. Its name was changed after the band were due to play an "in concert" broadcast for BBC Radio 1 on 16 July 1970, and had needed a title for John Peel to announce it. (Note: A free performance was held at London's Hyde Park in July 1970, arranged by former Floyd management, Peter Jenner and Andrew King, with Geesin in attendance, who was shocked by the performance.) Geesin pointed to a copy of the Evening Standard, and suggested to Waters that he would find a title in there. The headline of one article, on page 9, was: "Atom Heart Mother Named", a story about a woman being fitted with a Plutonium-238-powered pacemaker.

The piece as presented on the completed album is a progression from Pink Floyd's earlier instrumental pieces such as "A Saucerful of Secrets" and even earlier, "Interstellar Overdrive". The "Atom Heart Mother" suite takes up all of side one, and is split into six parts, individually named. Geesin chose the opening section name, "Father's Shout" after Earl "Fatha" Hines, while other names such as "Breast Milky" and "Funky Dung" were inspired by the album cover artwork. The orchestral arrangements feature a full brass section, a cello and the 16-piece John Alldis choir, which take most of the lead melody lines, while Pink Floyd mainly provide the backing tracks; a reverse of the 1960s pop music practice of using orchestration as the background, and putting the rock band in front.

=== Side two ===
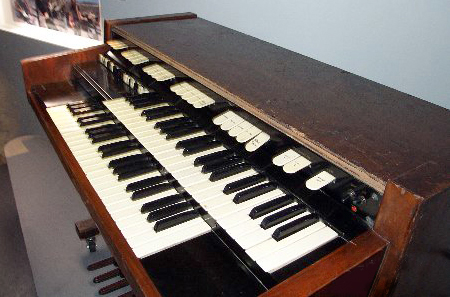
From around 1970, Rick Wright used a Hammond M102 organ on stage regularly, and it makes a prominent appearance on the album.

The album's concept is similar to their previous Ummagumma album, in that it features the full band in the first half, and focuses on individual members in the second half. Side two opens with three five-minute songs: one by each of the band's three resident songwriters; then closes with a sound effects-dominated musical suite primarily conceived by Mason and credited to the whole group. Waters contributes a folk ballad called "If", playing acoustic guitar. Pink Floyd rarely played the song live, but Waters often performed it at solo shows in support of his Radio K.A.O.S. album, more than a decade later. This is followed by Wright's "Summer '68", which also features prominent use of brass in places. It was issued as a Japanese single in 1971, and was the only track on the album never to be played live in concert. The song was reportedly about Wright and a groupie on tour, and had the working title of "One Night Stand".

According to Mason, Gilmour, having had little songwriting experience at that point, was ordered to remain in EMI until he had composed a song suitable for inclusion on the album. He came up with a folk-influenced tune, "Fat Old Sun", which he still cites as a personal favourite. The song was a regular part of the band's live repertoire in 1970–71, and became a staple of Gilmour's solo set in 2006.

The final track, "Alan's Psychedelic Breakfast", is divided into three segments, each with its own descriptive title, joined by dialogue and sound effects of then-roadie Alan Styles preparing, discussing, and eating breakfast. The idea for the piece came about by Waters experimenting with the rhythm of a dripping tap, which combined sound effects and dialogue recorded by Mason in his kitchen with musical pieces recorded at EMI. A slightly re-worked version was performed on stage on 22 December 1970 at Sheffield City Hall, Sheffield, England with the band members pausing between pieces to eat and drink their breakfast. The original LP ends with the sound of the tap which continues into the inner groove, and thus plays on indefinitely.

Original Floyd frontman Syd Barrett recorded his album Barrett around the same time as Atom Heart Mother, with assistance from Gilmour and Wright. He occasionally visited his old band's sessions to see what they were doing.

== Artwork ==
The bootleg The Dark Side of the Moo featured a fan's attempt at reproducing the cover.

The original album cover, designed by art collective Hipgnosis, shows a Holstein-Friesian cow standing in a pasture with no text nor any other clue as to what might be on the record. Some later editions have the title and artist name added to the cover. This concept was the group's reaction to the psychedelic space rock imagery associated with Pink Floyd at the time of the album's release; the band wanted to explore all sorts of music without being limited to a particular image or style of performance. They thus requested that their new album had "something plain" on the cover, which ended up being the image of a cow. Storm Thorgerson, inspired by Andy Warhol's famous "cow wallpaper", has said that he simply drove out into a rural area near Potters Bar and photographed the first cow he saw. The cow's owner identified her name as "Lulubelle III". More cows appear on the back cover, again with no text or titles, and on the inside gatefold. Also, a pink balloon shaped like a cow udder accompanied the album as part of Capitol's marketing strategy campaign to "break" the band in the US. Looking back on the artwork, Thorgerson remembered: "I think the cow represents, in terms of the Pink Floyd, part of their humour, which I think is often underestimated or just unwritten about."

In the mid-1980s, a bootleg containing rare singles and B-sides entitled The Dark Side of the Moo appeared, with a similar cover. Like Atom Heart Mother, the cover had no writing on it, although in this case it was to protect the bootlegger's anonymity rather than any artistic statement. The album cover for the KLF's concept album Chill Out was also inspired by Atom Heart Mother.

== Release and reception ==
Professional ratings
Review scores
Source	Rating
AllMusic	3/5 stars
Christgau's Record Guide	D+
The Daily Telegraph	2/5 stars
MusicHound Rock	2/5
The Rolling Stone Album Guide	1/5 stars
Sputnikmusic	3/5
Tom Hull	C−
Classic Rock	3.5/5 stars

Atom Heart Mother was released on 2 October 1970 in the UK and 10 October in the US. It reached number 1 and number 55, respectively in those countries' charts. It was released in the quadraphonic format in the UK, Germany (Note: UK EMI Harvest/HÖR ZU SHZE 297 Q) and Australia. (Note: Australia EMI Harvest Q4SHVL-781) A remastered CD was released in 1994 in the UK and the US. Mobile Fidelity Sound Lab released a 24KT gold CD in the US in 1994, while an LP version was released in the US in the same year. A remastered edition was released in 2011. It was reissued again in 2016 on the band's Pink Floyd Records label.

Critical reaction to the suite has always been mixed, and all band members have expressed negativity toward it. Gilmour has said the album was "a load of rubbish. We were at a real down point ... I think we were scraping the barrel a bit at that period" and "a good idea but it was dreadful... Atom Heart Mother sounds like we didn't have any idea between us, but we became much more prolific after it." Similarly, in a 1984 interview on BBC Radio 1, Waters said "If somebody said to me now – right – here's a million pounds, go out and play Atom Heart Mother, I'd say you must be fucking joking."

In a 1970 review, Alec Dubro of Rolling Stone appraised Atom Heart Mother negatively, stating "if Pink Floyd is looking for some new dimensions, they haven't found them here." In Christgau's Record Guide: Rock Albums of the Seventies (1981), Robert Christgau said the suite was easier to digest than the second side of songs: "Yeah, they do leave the singing to an anonymous semi-classical chorus, and yeah, they probably did get the horns for the fanfares at the same hiring hall. But at least the suite provides a few of the hypnotic melodies that made Ummagumma such an admirable record to fall asleep to." The album is ranked number 990 in All-Time Top 1000 Albums.

Stephen Thomas Erlewine of AllMusic called the album "the most impenetrable album Pink Floyd released while on Harvest," and said it was "often intriguing, more in what it suggests than what it achieves." He suggested that the album's 23-minute long opening track could prove to make the album an "acquired taste" to even hardened fans of the band.

== Live performances ==
The band were initially enthusiastic about performing the suite. An early performance was taped for the San Francisco television station KQED, featuring just the band, on 28 April 1970. Two major performances were at the Bath Festival of Blues and Progressive Music on 27 June and the "Blackhills Garden Party" in Hyde Park, London on 18 July. On both occasions the band were accompanied by the John Alldis Choir and the Philip Jones Brass Ensemble. Later, the band took a full brass section and choir on tour just for the purpose of performing this piece. However, this caused the tour to lose money, and the band found problems with the hired musicians, which changed from gig to gig as they simply took who was available, which, combined with lack of rehearsal and problems miking up the whole ensemble, made a full live performance more problematic. Reflecting on this, Gilmour said "some of the brass players have been really hopeless". According to Mason, the band arrived at one gig in Aachen, Germany, only to discover they had left the sheet music behind, forcing tour manager Tony Howard to go back to London and get it.

A later arrangement without brass or choir, and pared down from 25 minutes to fifteen by omitting the "collage" sections and closing reprise of the main theme, remained in their live repertoire into 1972. The first live performance of The Dark Side of the Moon suite in Brighton was abandoned partway through; after a break, the band played Atom Heart Mother instead. Pink Floyd's last live performance of the suite took place on 22 May 1972 at the Olympisch Stadion, Amsterdam, Netherlands.

The title track was performed live by Radio France Philharmonic Orchestra in Paris on 12 January 2012 with Ron Geesin playing piano. This was made available on YouTube on 23 July 2024

== Legacy ==
Stanley Kubrick wanted to use the album's title track in A Clockwork Orange. The group refused permission, primarily because Kubrick was unsure of exactly which pieces of music he wanted and what he wished to do with them. In retrospect, Waters said "maybe it's just as well it wasn't used after all". Nevertheless, the album is visible behind the counter in the record store scene of the film.

On 14 and 15 June 2008, Geesin performed "Atom Heart Mother" with Italian tribute band Mun Floyd over two nights as part of the Chelsea Festival. Geesin introduced it with a history and slide show. The performances featured the chamber choir Canticum, brass and cellist Caroline Dale, who has worked with Gilmour. The second night saw Gilmour join Geesin on stage for the performance, which was extended to 30 minutes.

In 2013, Geesin produced a book, The Flaming Cow, which documented his experience with working with Pink Floyd, including the making of this album from his point of view.

Music critic Jim DeRogatis called the album the "strongest offering from the mid-period Floyd."

== Track listing ==
Side one
No.	Title	Writer(s)	Lead vocals	Length
1.	"Atom Heart Mother" I. "Father's Shout" (2:50) II. "Breast Milky" (2:33) III. "Mother Fore" (4:50) IV. "Funky Dung" (5:15) V. "Mind Your Throats Please" (2:30) VI. "Remergence" (5:46)	Nick Mason; David Gilmour; Roger Waters; Richard Wright; Ron Geesin	John Alldis Choir	23:44
Total length:				23:44

Side two
No.	Title	Writer(s)	Lead vocals	Length
2.	"If"	Waters	Waters	4:31
3.	"Summer '68"	Wright	Wright	5:29
4.	"Fat Old Sun"	Gilmour	Gilmour	5:22
5.	"Alan's Psychedelic Breakfast" I. "Rise and Shine" (3:33) II. "Sunny Side Up" (4:12) III. "Morning Glory" (5:15)	Waters; Mason; Gilmour; Wright	Instrumental, speech by Alan Styles	13:00
Total length:				28:22 (52:06)

== Personnel ==
Taken from sleeve notes. Track numbers noted in parentheses below are based on CD track numbering.

Pink Floyd

- David Gilmour – electric guitar (1, 2, 4, 5), slide guitar (1, 2), pedal steel guitar (4, 5), acoustic guitar (3–5), classical guitar (3), bass and drums (4), vocals (4)
- Nick Mason – drums (1–3, 5), percussion (1, 3, 5), sound effects (1, 5)
- Roger Waters – bass (1–3, 5), classical guitar (2), vocals (2), sound effects (1, 5)
- Richard Wright – piano (1–3, 5), Farfisa organ (1, 4), Hammond organ (1–5), Mellotron (1), vocals (3)

Additional musicians

- EMI Pops Orchestra – brass and orchestral sections (uncredited)
- Hafliði Hallgrímsson – cello (1) (uncredited)
- John Alldis Choir – choir (1)
- Alan Styles – voice and sound effects (5) (uncredited)

Production

- Ron Geesin – orchestration and co-composition (1) (uncredited)
- Peter Bown – engineering
- Alan Parsons – engineering (misspelled as "Allan Parsons" on the original sleeve)
- Doug Sax, James Guthrie – 1994 remastering at The Mastering Lab, L.A.
- James Guthrie, Joel Plante – 2011 remastering at das boot recording

== Charts ==
=== Weekly charts ===
1970 weekly chart performance for Atom Heart Mother
Chart (1970)	Peak position
Australian Albums (Kent Music Report)	30
Canada Top Albums/CDs (RPM)	39
Danish Albums (Tracklisten)	8
Dutch Albums (Album Top 100)	5
French Albums (SNEP)	4
German Albums (Offizielle Top 100)	8
Italian Albums (Discografia Internazionale)	9
Norwegian Albums (VG-lista)	13
UK Albums (Official Charts)	1
US Billboard 200	55

2011–2012 weekly chart performance for Atom Heart Mother
Chart (2011–2012)	Peak position
French Albums (SNEP)	66
Spanish Albums (Promusicae)	79
Swiss Albums (Schweizer Hitparade)	81

2023–2025 weekly chart performance for Atom Heart Mother
Chart (2023–2025)	Peak position
Hungarian Physical Albums (MAHASZ)	34
Swiss Albums (Schweizer Hitparade)	64

=== Year-end charts ===
Year-end chart performance for Atom Heart Mother
Chart (1971)	Position
Dutch Albums (Album Top 100)	62
German Albums (Offizielle Top 100)	43

== Certifications ==
Region	Certification	Certified units/sales
Austria (IFPI Austria)	Gold	25,000^{*}
France (SNEP)	Gold	100,000^{*}
Germany (BVMI)	Gold	250,000^{^}
Italy (FIMI) (since 2009)	Platinum	50,000^{‡}
United Kingdom (BPI) 1994 release	Gold	100,000^{^}
United States (RIAA)	Gold	500,000^{^}
^{*} Sales figures based on certification alone.^{^} Shipments figures based on certification alone.^{‡} Sales+streaming figures based on certification alone.
