= Campbell's Soup Cans =

Artwork series by Andy Warhol (1961–62)

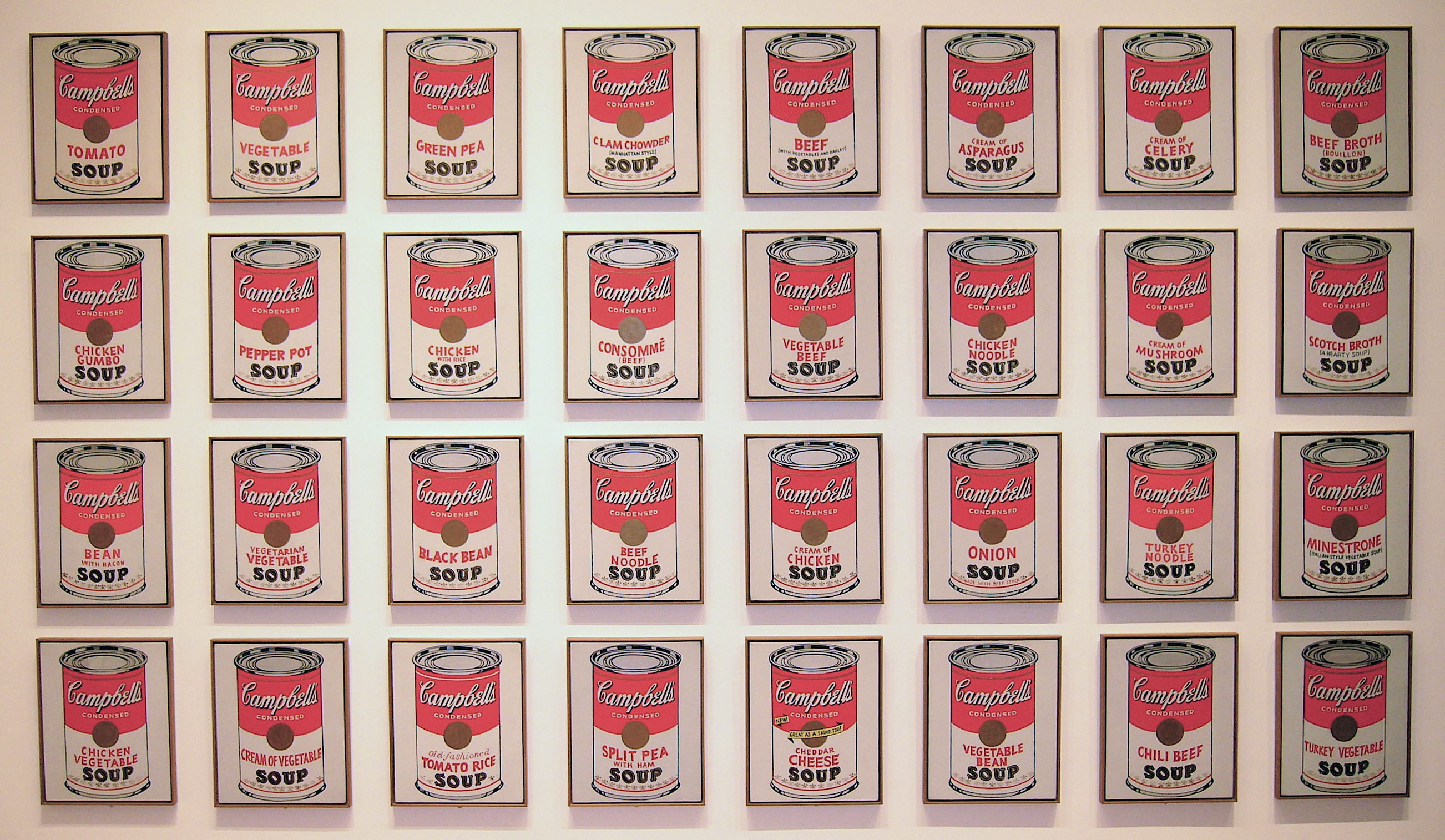
- Artist: Andy Warhol
- Year: 1961–62
- Catalogue: 79809
- Medium: Synthetic polymer paint on canvas
- Movement: Pop Art
- Dimensions: 20 by 16 inches (51 cm × 41 cm) each for 32 canvases
- Location: Museum of Modern Art. Acquired from Irving Blum in 1996, New York City (32 canvas series displayed by year of introduction)
- Accession: 476.1996.1–32

Campbell's Soup Cans is a series of 32 paintings produced by American artist Andy Warhol between 1961 and 1962. Each painting depicts a different variety of Campbell's soup cans in a uniform 20-by-16-inch format. First exhibited in July 1962 at the Ferus Gallery in Los Angeles, the pop art works challenged traditional distinctions between fine art and commercial imagery. Warhol's association with the subject led to his name becoming synonymous with the Campbell's soup cans. The series catapulted Warhol to fame and contributed to critical discourse about originality, reproduction, and the meaning of art in a consumer society.

Drawing on his background as a commercial illustrator, Warhol focused on the packaging of everyday items, making high art of the artistic depiction of the commercial packaging rather than of the everyday items themselves, prompting initial controversy but eventual acclaim. The Campbell's Soup Cans series generally refers to the original 32 canvases, but it also encompasses Warhol's many subsequent variations: approximately 20 similar paintings produced in the early 1960s; a 1965 set of 20 larger multi-colored canvases; numerous related drawings, sketches, and stencils created over the years; and two separate editions of 250 ten-print screen print portfolios issued in 1968 and 1969. The original 32 canvases were preserved by art dealer Irving Blum and later acquired by the Museum of Modern Art in 1996.

Warhol's Campbell's Soup Cans are widely regarded as a canonical symbol of Pop art and one of the most influential bodies of art of the 20th century. The later sets of screen prints are sometimes confused with the original 1962 series, and unauthorized prints have also circulated. Despite this, the series has maintained a lasting presence in popular culture, inspiring derivative works by other artists and achieving multimillion-dollar results in the art market.

== Background ==
Andy Warhol moved to New York City in 1949 after studying at the Carnegie Institute of Technology in Pittsburgh, and quickly found success as a commercial illustrator, with his first published drawing appearing in Glamour that same year. As a student at Carnegie Tech, Warhol developed his signature "blotted line" technique from tracing images on paper and blotting the wet ink to create irregular, variable lines. Using this technique, he duplicated and varied motifs, often drawing on images from the New York Public Library. Warhol held his first gallery exhibition in 1952 at the Bodley Gallery and, throughout the 1950s, regularly showed drawings and exhibited at institutions including the Museum of Modern Art in 1956. He subsequently used photographs taken by his one-time lover Edward Wallowitch as source material for his drawings, notably his self-published A Gold Book (1957).

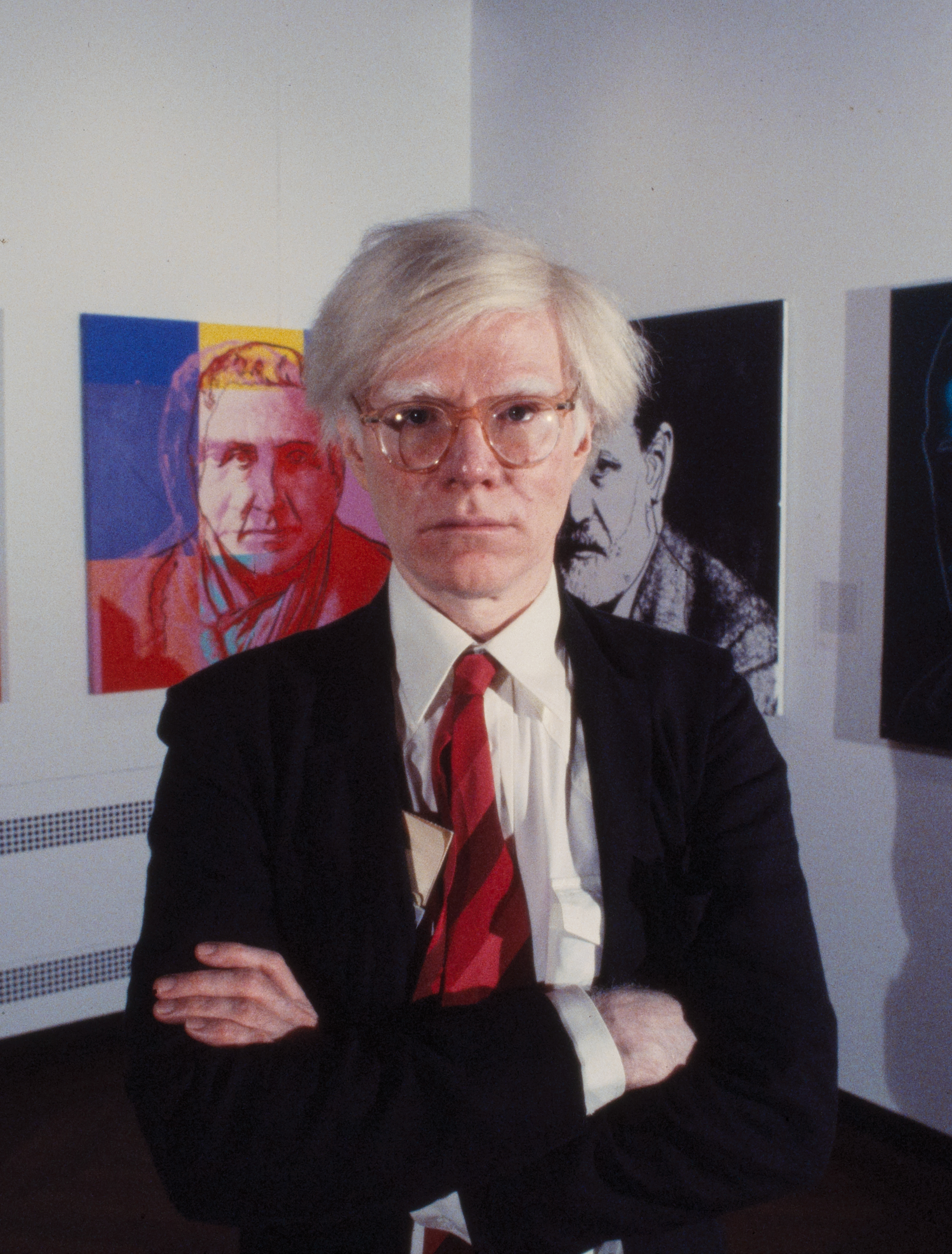
Warhol at the Jewish Museum in New York, 1980

By 1961, Warhol began producing canvases based on comic strips and newspaper advertisements. He was able to get exposure for these works by using them as a backdrop for his Bonwit Teller window design in April 1961. Yet he remained behind some of his peers in securing gallery representation. Having been rejected by the Leo Castelli Gallery for similarities in his work to the style of comics done by Roy Lichtenstein, Warhol was seeking a distinct direction within the emerging Pop art movement. He turned to everyday commercial imagery such as Campbell's soup cans, dollar bills, and Coca-Cola bottles. In 1961, Warhol said, "I've got to do something that really will have a lot of impacts that will be different enough from Lichtenstein and James Rosenquist, that will be very personal, that won't look like I'm doing exactly what they're doing."

== Technique and production ==
During this period, Warhol was wavering between action painting and abstract expressionism, with his style of drip painting. Experimenting with hand painting, stenciling, and rubber stamps, he began to standardize his process using acrylic paint and serial repetition. Warhol was influenced by the painter Max Arthur Cohn's screen printing technique. In late 1961, Warhol began learning silkscreen printing from Floriano Vecchi of Tiber Press, refining his technique through repeated visits and advice on pigments and squeegee handling. Warhol moved toward silkscreening to increase efficiency, which would define his later practice. Soon, Warhol had mastered the process of pushing ink through a glue-prepared silk screen with a rubber squeegee.

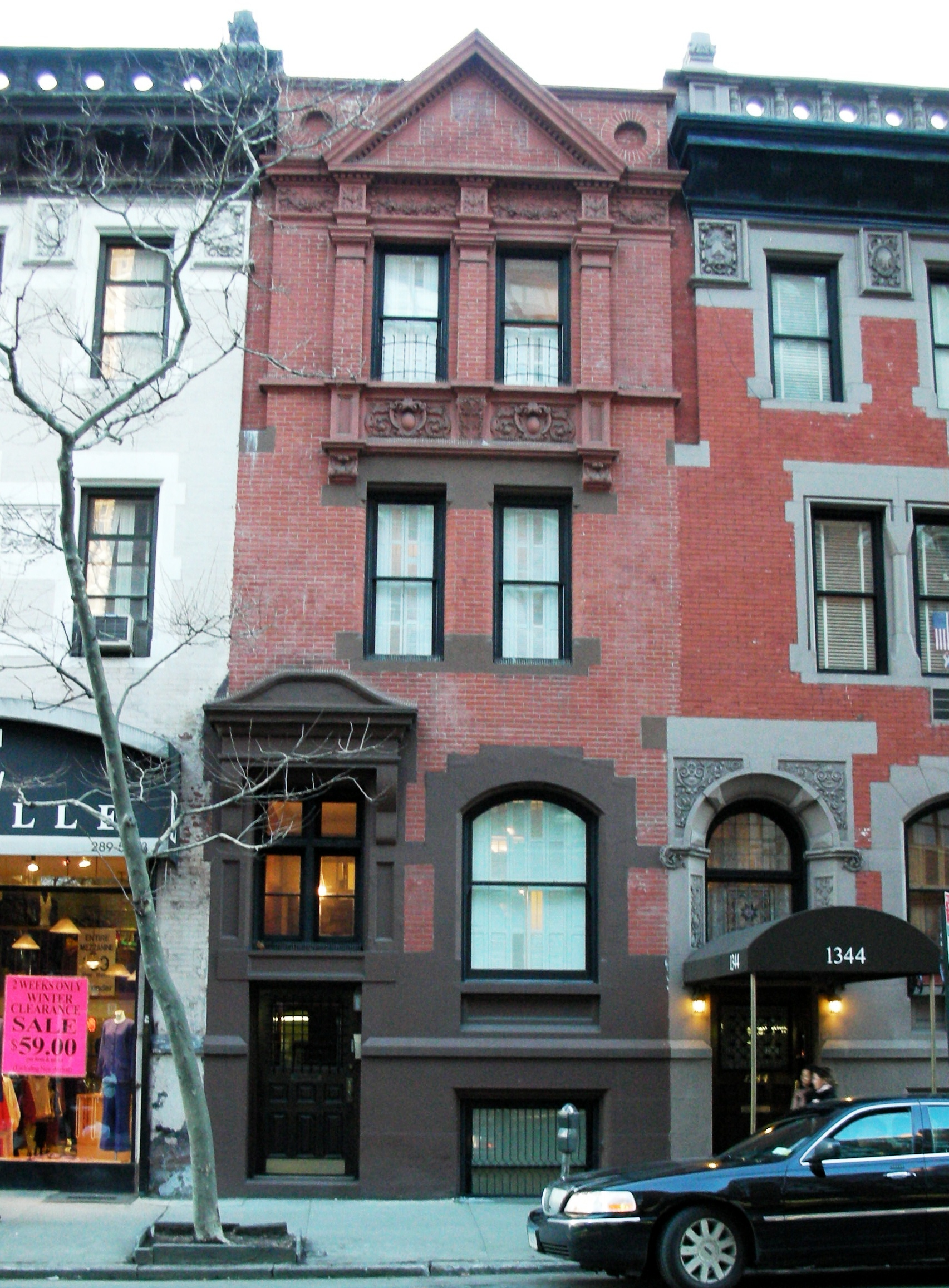
Warhol's 1960–74 residence at 1342 Lexington Avenue in 2007, where he produced the original Campbell's Soup Cans series

In late 1961, Warhol began working on Campbell's Soup Cans at his home studio at 1342 Lexington Avenue in New York. The series consisted of 32 hand-painted canvases, each depicting a different variety of Campbell's soup. They were based on photographs taken by his former boyfriend Edward Wallowitch. Contrary to later confusion, the works were not silkscreens but traced and painted canvases incorporating stamped details. Warhol used a rubber stamp to apply the gold fleur-de-lis near the lower portion of each image and worked with commercial-grade acrylic paint rather than the oil paint more typical of fine art. These were among the last works Warhol painted largely by hand.

Between November 1961 and mid-1962, he painted roughly fifty soup-can canvases, including the definitive set of thirty-two completed by June 1962. According to the Andy Warhol Catalogue Raisonné, the project also included three large grid paintings (one depicting 200 cans and two depicting 100 cans) and numerous related still lifes. By March 1962, art critic David Bourdon had seen examples of Warhol's Campbell's Soup Cans when he visited his studio, as others soon did. When art dealer Irving Blum visited Warhol's studio in May 1962, Warhol was working on his sixteenth soup can painting. Blum was surprised to learn that Warhol did not yet have gallery representation and offered him an exhibition at the Ferus Gallery in Los Angeles.

Warhol was featured in a May 11, 1962, Time magazine article "The Slice-of-Cake School", which noted that he was "currently occupied with a series of 'portraits' of Campbell's soup cans in living colour." Warhol quoted as saying, "I just paint things I always thought were beautiful, things you use every day and never think about...I'm working on soup...I just do it because I like it."

== Exhibitions ==
=== Ferus Gallery exhibition ===
In June 1962, Warhol sent Blum the 32 completed canvases, each measuring 20-by-16-inches. A June 26 postcard from Blum confirmed their arrival and advised keeping prices low during the initial Los Angeles showing.

The exhibition opened July 9, 1962, at the Ferus Gallery, with Warhol absent and without a formal opening. The opening coincided with La Cienega Boulevard's popular Monday Art Walk. The paintings were displayed in a single row on narrow ledges, like grocery items on a shelf. This untraditional presentation choice of the interjection of pop culture into art converted the gallery exhibition into a statement about the boundaries of commercial enterprise. Initially, the installation left many visitors perplexed, uncertain how to interpret the repeated image of a commonplace supermarket product displayed as high art.

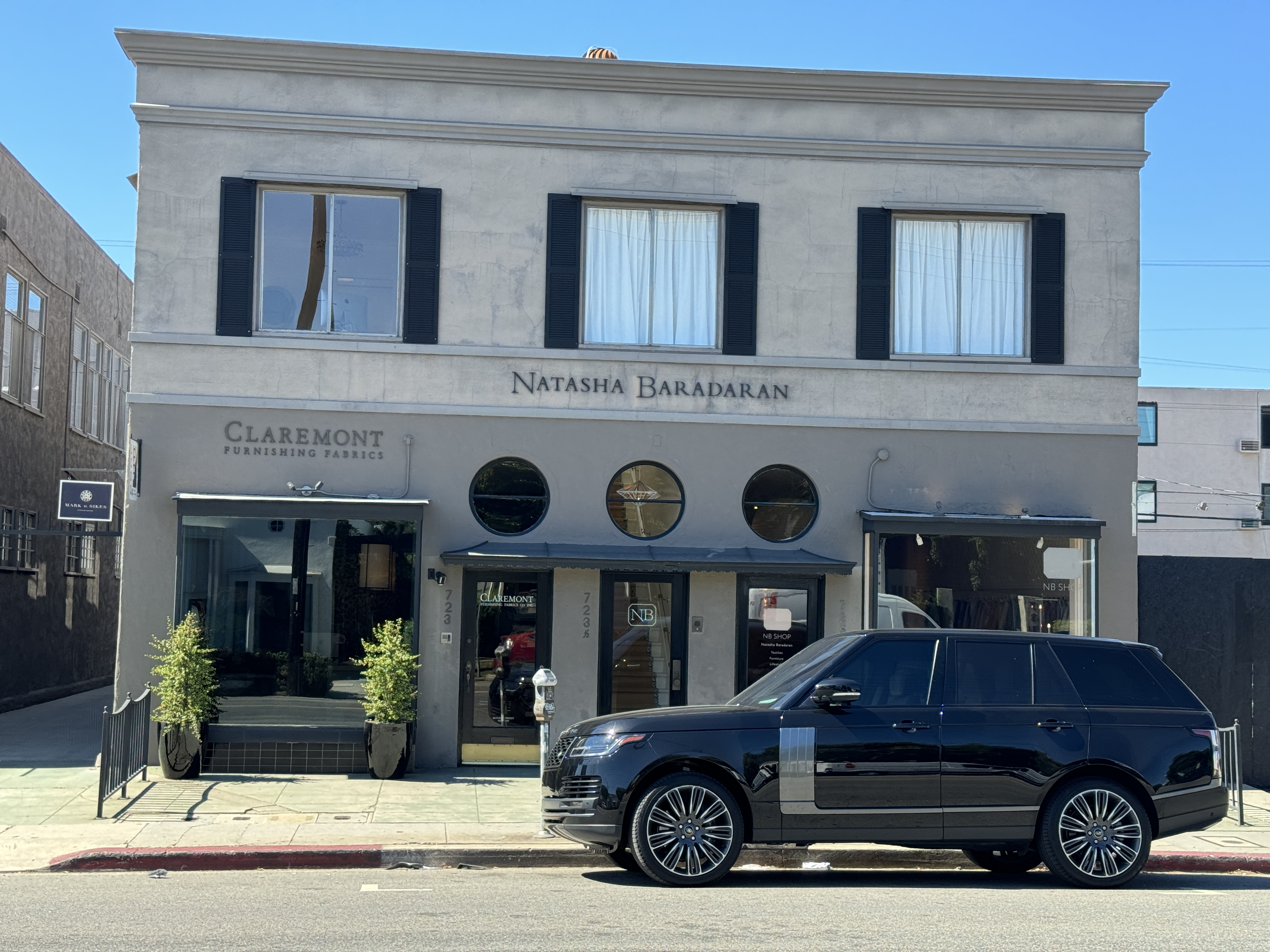
723 La Cienega Boulevard, 1962 location of the Ferus Gallery in Beverly Grove, Los Angeles, 2023

Only five or six paintings were sold, including Campbell's Soup Can (Tomato), which was reserved by actor Dennis Hopper before the opening. When no further buyers emerged, Blum had the idea to keep all 32 works together as a set. Blum later recalled that he contacted the clients who had bought paintings, including Hopper, Betty Asher, Don Factor, Bob Rowan, and Edwin Janss, and asked them to relinquish their purchases. The buyers agreed, and because the paintings had not yet been delivered and remained in the gallery, Blum was able to acquire the complete set himself. After securing the paintings, Blum contacted Warhol and asked to purchase the entire set. Warhol offered the group for $1,000 ($10643.56 in 2025), and the two agreed to a payment plan under which Blum paid in ten monthly installments of $100 ($1064.36 in 2025). Reportedly, Factor, who is said to have also chosen Campbell's Soup Can (Tomato), "never forgave" Blum. Blum acknowledged there was "a certain amount of anger" as Warhol's market value rose substantially through the years.

The exhibition closed on August 4, 1962, the same day actress Marilyn Monroe died. Shortly afterward, Warhol began producing silkscreen portraits of Monroe, further expanding his exploration of celebrity imagery. His second exhibition at the Ferus Gallery in October 1963 featured silkscreen portraits of Elvis Presley and Elizabeth Taylor. Blum used the lure of Hollywood celebrity to entice Warhol for the second exhibition. Dennis Hopper and his then-wife Brooke Hayward held a welcoming party for the event to help Warhol meet West Coast artists and celebrities.

=== Subsequent early exhibitions ===
Although Warhol had yet to receive an offer for full-time gallery representation, art dealers Allan Stone and Martha Jackson spent a few months planning a December 1962 exhibition of his work. Jackson ultimately canceled the show while Warhol's Campbell's Soup Cans were still on view at Ferus Gallery, writing in a letter that her gallery was committed to artists of an earlier generation and that introducing his work had caused "very bad repercussions." Despite this, Jackson accepted several paintings on consignment, and her assistant, John Weber, sold ten of them.

In August 1962, Warhol's Pop art received its first museum presentation in a survey when Big Campbell's Soup Can with Can Opener (Vegetable) was included in a group exhibition at the Wadsworth Atheneum in Hartford, Connecticut. In October 1962, Warhol participated in Sidney Janis Gallery's landmark exhibition The New Realists: An Exhibition of Factual Painting & Sculpture, showing 200 Soup Cans, Big Campbell's Soup Can (Beef Noodle), and other works alongside artists such as Roy Lichtenstein and Claes Oldenburg. The exhibition had a major impact on the New York art world and helped establish Pop art as a nationally recognized movement. Warhol's first New York solo Pop exhibition opened on November 6, 1962, at Eleanor Ward's Stable Gallery. Although no soup cans were included, the show featured works such as Marilyn Diptych and earned strong critical praise.

For the landmark 1964 American Supermarket exhibition at the Bianchini Gallery in Manhattan, Warhol chose a screen print of Campbell's Soup Cans alongside his box sculptures, and actual autographed cans, which he jokingly referred to as his "Duchamp number," underscoring the readymade tradition. Fans frequently sought his signature on Campbell soup cans, and Warhol often obliged.

== Critical reception ==
The initial reaction to the exhibition was marked by skepticism and sales were minimal, but the show quickly propelled art and commerce to a trending topic status. The nearby Primus Stuart Gallery mocked the show by stacking a pyramid of real Campbell's soup cans in its window beneath a sign reading, "Do Not Be Misled. Get the Original. Our Low Price 2 for 33 Cents."

The Los Angeles Times published a cartoon ridiculing the paintings, and critic Jack Smith questioned whether Warhol was serious, writing that he briefly suspected "Mr. Warhol might have had his tongue in his cheek." However, Irving Blum, proprietor of the Ferus Gallery, insisted otherwise: "This young fellow is deadly serious." Blum argued that Warhol was introducing subject matter in "a very new, fresh way," describing the paintings as possessing "a relentlessness… with a terrifying, Kafkaesque intensity." While acknowledging that their ultimate importance in art history remained to be seen, Blum maintained that he was convinced of their validity.

Reviewing the Ferus Gallery exhibition for Artforum, Henry T. Hopkins described it as having "peculiar significance" for those who grew up amid the commercial imagery of the 1930s and 1940s, including comic books, mail-order catalogs, and the "Campbell Soup Kids." He noted that although the show "may make a neat, negative point about standardization it also has a positive point to make. In a tenderloin-oriented society it is a nostalgic call for a return to nature." Hopkins observed that Warhol avoided expressive painterly technique in favor of a "hard commercial surface," and concluded that, despite their conceptual premise, individual preferences still emerged; his personal favorite among the series was Onion.

In 1965, Canadian journalist Robert Fulford wrote for the Toronto Star: "About four years ago Warhol began exhibiting enormous paintings of Coca-Cola bottles and Campbell's Tomato Soup cans. Since then he's gone from strength to strength … He has become the most publicized young American painter of the 1960s, the consummate pop artist. His soup cans, in fact, are the main symbol—engaging to some people, utterly outlandish to others—of what has happened to American art in these curious years."

== The Campbell's Company ==
=== Company history ===
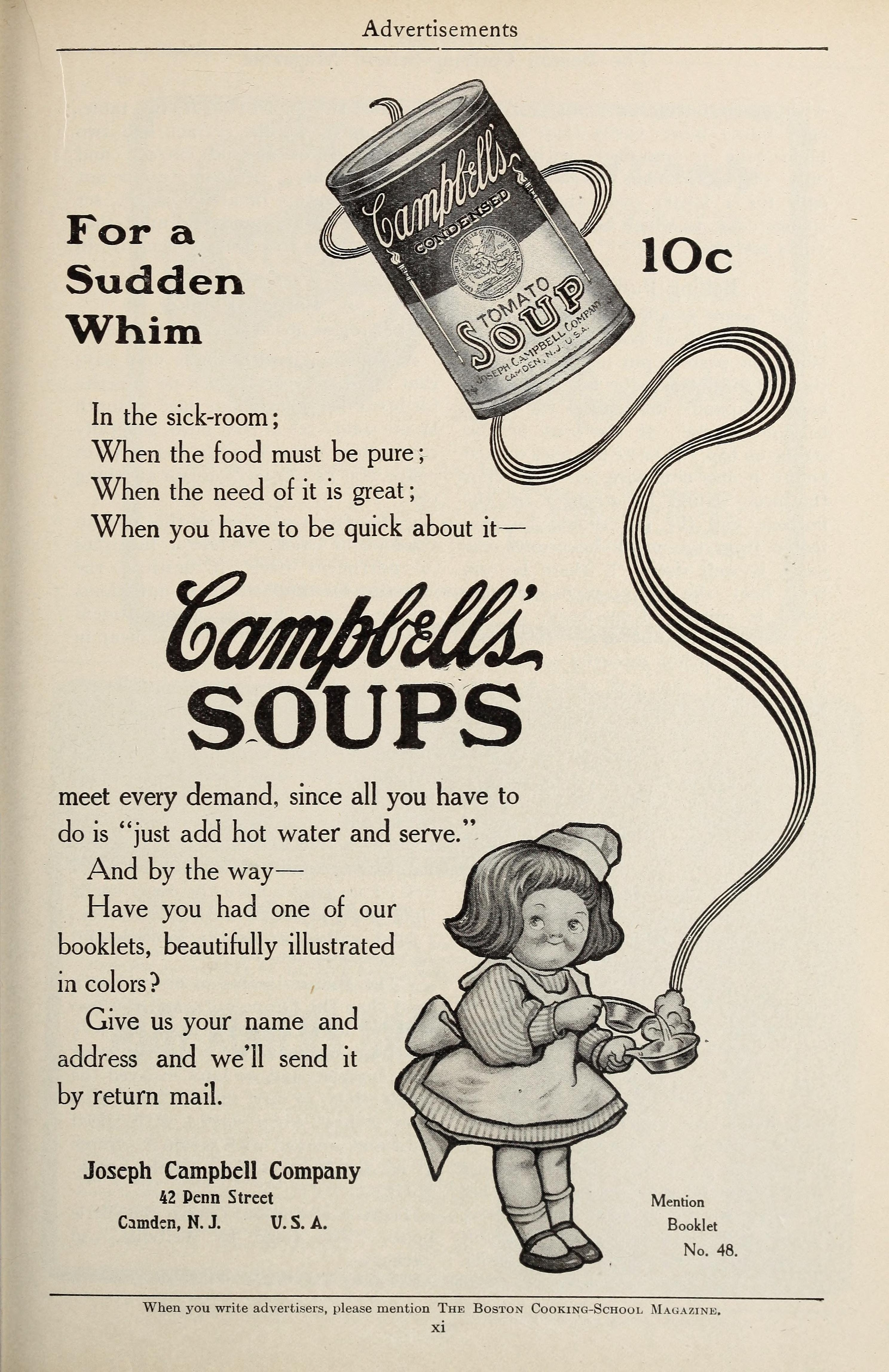
1905 version of the Campbell's Soup can and label in a print ad

The Campbell's Company was founded in 1869 by Joseph A. Campbell, a fruit merchant from Bridgeton, New Jersey, and Abraham Anderson, an icebox manufacturer from South Jersey. When Anderson left the company in 1876, his son, Campbell Speelman, remained at Campbell's as a creative director and designed the original Campbell's soup cans. In 1894, Arthur Dorrance became the company president. In 1897, John T. Dorrance, a nephew of company president Dorrance, began working for the company. Dorrance, a chemist, developed a commercially viable method for condensing soup, leading to the famous red and white label in 1898. The new label was inspired by the Cornell Big Red football team uniforms. In the 21st century, the label continued to retain elements of the 1898 design, such as the tilted letter "O" in the word Soup, and the gold medal that was added in 1900. Small adjustments were made to the label by the time Warhol's Campbell's Soup Cans were presented in 1962. By the 1960s, Campbell's was the leading soup among housewives and mothers as it was being marketed by the company as both a meal and an ingredient in recipes.

=== Reaction to Warhol's art ===
Although Warhol's Campbell's Soup Cans were publicly discussed by May 1962, he initially hoped the Campbell company would remain unaware, believing that any business relationship or commercial tie-in would undermine the work's meaning. During the July 1962 Ferus Gallery exhibition, Campbell's CEO William Murphy sent legal representatives to assess "use and violation of trademarks." The company considered legal action but ultimately chose to observe public reaction instead and sent him a case of tomato soup. During the exhibition, Ferus Gallery director Irving Blum wrote to the Campbell's proposing that the company purchase the 32 paintings and donate one to each of 32 different museums as a promotional gesture, but he never received a response. Warhol also recalled asking if they were interested in purchasing a painting, but they declined.

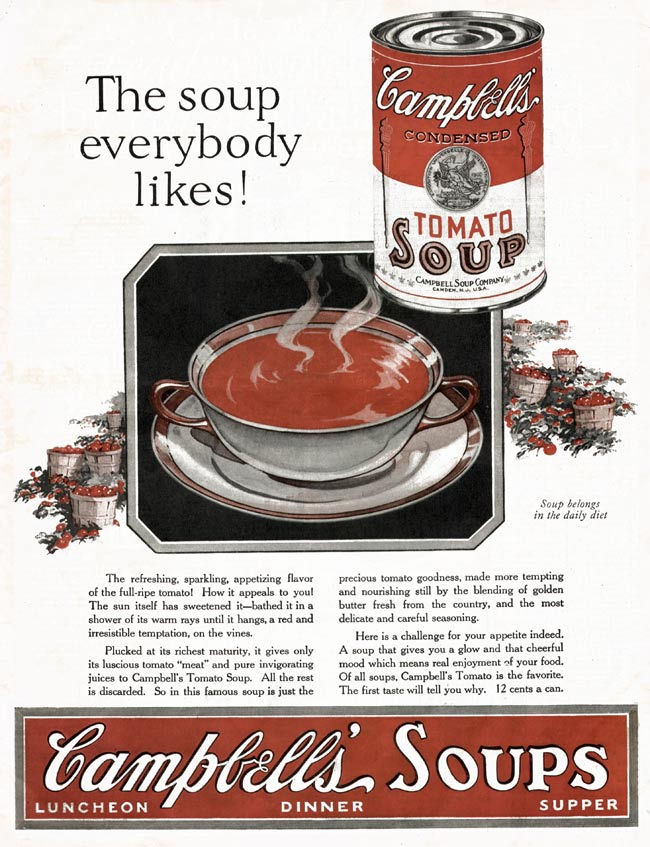
Campbell's tomato soup print ad in People's Home Journal, 1927

Within months, soup-can-inspired fashion appeared in Manhattan society, and by late 1962, Campbell's shifted its stance, commissioning Warhol to paint a Campbell's tomato soup can as a gift for retiring board chairman Oliver G. Willits. In 1964, Campbell's sent Warhol complimentary cases of soup in a gesture of goodwill, and in 1965, they printed the invitations for his exhibition at the Institute of Contemporary Art in Philadelphia. Prior to the January 1, 1967 publication of Andy Warhol's Index (book) by Random House the Company wrote (in response to subsidy/sponsorship inquiries) that they had "...not attempted to influence Mr. Warhol in any way. So far as we know, all his selections of commercial products as art subjects have been entirely his own." However, in 1967, Campbell's objected to the use of its can label on promotional materials for Warhol's exhibition at the Institute of Contemporary Art in Boston. That same year, the company sent a letter to Random House regarding reproductions of Warhol's Campbell's Soup Cans paintings in an upcoming book about the artist. According to the letter, Campbell's did not view Warhol's artistic use of its logo as a copyright infringement. It stipulated that Warhol could not reproduce the logo on actual soup cans, as this would place him in direct competition with Campbell's. Warhol agreed to the condition.

Although Campbell's never sued Warhol over his paintings, a few justices of the U.S. Supreme Court have indicated that he likely would have prevailed under fair use. In a majority opinion in Google LLC v. Oracle America, Inc., Justice Stephen Breyer observed that an "artistic painting" could qualify as fair use even if it precisely replicated a copyrighted "advertising logo to make a comment about consumerism." Similarly, in Andy Warhol Foundation for the Visual Arts, Inc. v. Goldsmith—which drew on precedent from Campbell v. Acuff-Rose Music, Inc.—Justice Neil Gorsuch remarked, that "Campbell's Soup seems to me an easy case" because Warhol's purpose was not to sell soup in supermarkets, but to provoke a reaction from viewers in a "museum or in other settings."

== Inspiration ==
According to Sarah Kelly Oehler, Luigi Lucioni's use of a Campbell's Soup Can, presented as a can with the "distinctive red-and-white label", as a symbol of modern culture of the time in his Still Life with Telephone (1926) is possibly the first artistic depiction of a Campbell's Soup Can in high art. She states that Campbell's soup was among the most American foods of the 20th century because the company's innovation of industrial canning greatly improved food commerce and the 1897 introduction of five flavors of canned soup by the Joseph Campbell Preserve Company embodied the American values of "ingenuity, economy and modernity". The successful marketing of the product line and its 1898 label led to 21 varieties and a name change to Campbell's Soup Company by 1922. Lucioni's work depicted the telephone and canned soup as modern symbols of industry and technology to contrast with homemade wine and an apple as longstanding symbols of nature and tradition. Painted in the year that Clarence Birdseye earned a patent for frozen food development, Still Life with Telephone, introduced and legitimized the "commodification of American food" via new technologies well before Warhol.

Although Warhol had been trained in art school to paint still-life fruit bowls on a table, he longed to paint something different. Rather than focusing on the soup or presenting it in the context of a still life as Lucioni, Warhol made the label and the brand the focus in the series. Campbell's tomato soup evoked both routine and memory, blending autobiography with mass production. Warhol later recalled a personal connection to Campbell's tomato soup, a staple of his childhood lunches in Pittsburgh: "Many an afternoon at lunchtime Mom would open a can of Campbell's for me, because that's all we could afford, I love it to this day." In a 1963 interview, he remarked, "I used to drink it, I used to have the same lunch every day, for twenty years."

The soup is said to have reminded Warhol of his mother, Julia Warhola, who served it to him regularly while raising him during the Great Depression, as a Rusyn immigrant in a Pennsylvania coal mine town. At times, the family could not even afford to splurge on Campbell's soup and ate soup made from ketchup. It is regarded as doubtful that his family had Campbell's soup often, since it was marketed as an upscale item, and Julia was a homemaker who could cook soup from scratch. It was not until the late 1950s that canned soup was targeted toward the working class.

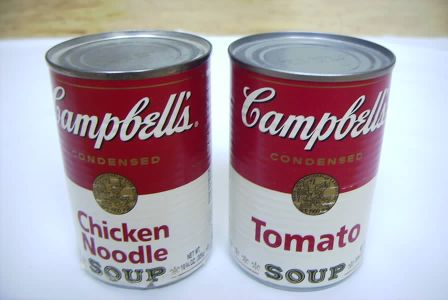
Condensed Campbell's soup cans, 2005

Several stories mention that Warhol's choice of soup cans reflected his own avid devotion to Campbell's soup as a consumer. Warhol himself offered varying explanations, reinforcing the work's mix of personal attachment and cultural symbolism. One widely repeated story credits Muriel Latow, who allegedly advised him in late 1961 to paint "something you see every day and that everybody would recognize—like a can of Campbell's Soup," for which she was paid $50 ($538.7 in 2025). Other anecdotes suggest the idea emerged from grocery shopping, his fondness for soup and Coca-Cola, or even his mother Julia's habit of crafting decorative flowers from tin cans. Some observed that Warhol merely painted things he held close to his heart. Robert Indiana recalled, "I knew Andy very well. The reason he painted soup cans is that he liked soup."

=== Alternate inspiration possibilities ===
Artist Willem de Kooning, by the 1960s a leading figure in the art world, used "soup" as imagery in relation to Abstract expressionism, saying, "Everything is already in art, Like a big bowl of soup. Everything is in there already...", while other New York artists used soup as a slang word when discussing their art.

Art critic Blake Gopnik noted that Warhol's repetition of nearly identical Campbell's Soup Cans could be linked to Yves Klein's identical blue monochrome paintings. Gopnik notes that Klein had invited Warhol to his early 1962 wedding to Rotraut Klein-Moquay, and Warhol's work had incorporated International Klein Blue. Warhol discussed Klein's presentation of his work (1957, Milan) as an influence on his own presentation at the Ferus.

According to writers Tony Scherman and David Dalton, Warhol purchased six miniature paintings from artist Frank Stella's "Benjamin Moore" series in May 1961. Stella's color-based series, in which each painting corresponded to a shade in the paint manufacturer's product line, has been suggested as a possible inspiration for Warhol's Campbell's Soup Cans, which he began later that year.

In 1952, Julia Warhola sketched a Campbell's Soup Can. Additionally, she supported her family with sculptural works of cans converted into flower bouquets. Campbell's Soup Cans were among the cans that she worked from to create her art.

== Interpretation ==
Warhol embraced ordinary consumer culture and believed Abstract expressionism had deliberately ignored the vitality of modern life. With the Campbell's Soup Cans and related series, he sought to affirm the visual language of mass production while stripping away overt emotion, gesture, and personal expression. His detached, deadpan style aligned with what Time magazine called the "Slice of Cake School"—artists who treated the banal artifacts of contemporary civilization as legitimate subjects for high art. Presentations of individual cans could represent consumption while group presentations represent mass production.

Campbell's Soup Can (Tomato) (1962); drawings like this were used as the basis for paintings

Unlike Monet's serial studies, which explored subtle shifts of light and perception, Warhol's repetitions emphasized sameness. His soup cans are nearly identical, differing only in minor, often mechanical variations. By adopting commercial techniques—stencils, stamps, and eventually silkscreen—he rejected painterly nuance and traditional markers of artistic skill. Repetition itself became the subject. Echoing Marcel Duchamp's conceptual approach, Warhol suggested that meaning lay not in visual refinement but in the idea of placing fifty nearly identical soup cans on a canvas.

The effect unsettled critics. Compared with the sensual still life paintings of Caravaggio, Chardin, or Cézanne, Warhol's stark, industrial images seemed cold and impersonal. Yet this very neutrality forced viewers to reconsider what qualifies as art. By isolating a familiar supermarket product and enlarging it within the gallery, Warhol shifted attention from craftsmanship to context, from expression to concept. For some European audiences, the work read as Marxist critique or satire of American capitalism; others saw it as a commentary on dehumanization in mass culture. Warhol himself maintained an apolitical stance, presenting the cans without overt judgment. In 1962, he said, "I want to show the monotony in the way things are. You see these things every day and by painting them you realize how boring life really is."

In 1962, Bennington College student Suzy Stanton wrote a paper titled "On Warhol's Campbell's Soup Can" for her Art and Communication course, a parody encounter with Warhol and reactions to his soup can paintings. The piece consisted of sixteen fictional, witty accounts of Stanton and her classmates visiting his studio. Her professor, Lawrence Alloway, forwarded the essay to Warhol, who enthusiastically reproduced it "photostatically" as an exhibition announcement for his show at the Stable Gallery in New York. Excerpts were later published in the Summer 1963 issue of Art Journal. In the satirical piece, she described the work as a "criticism of the decay of modern civilization", and the cans as a symbol of dehumanization for the "urbanized and mass-producing civilization with its bourgeois values."

According to art critic David Bourdon, Warhol's Pop art works may have been nothing more than an attempt to attract attention to his work. David Bourdon notes that Warhol changed the concept of art appreciation. Instead of harmonious three-dimensional arrangements of objects, he chose mechanical derivatives of commercial illustration, with an emphasis on the packaging. Contrary, art critic Blake Gopnik describes Warhol's presentation as objective and unblinking with no promotional intent. Gopnik describes the work as "...radical new pictures in an unknown and weirdly repetitive style by an artist with zero name recognition and no local ties." The initial response to Campbell's Soup cans was that his work began selling briskly, but its controversial nature had bad implications on galleries that carried his work.

According to the MoMA, Warhol "Warhol was careful to maintain an exceptional uniformity among the canvases and to minimize the visibility of brushstrokes or other signs of his own hand." However, the Oxford Art Journal has pointed to subtle imperfections in the paintings, including shaky and inconsistent contours, distortions in parallel lines, irregular lettering, and the blank or unfinished gold medallions, which it describes as a glaring inconsistency.

Art historian Kirk Varnedoe dismissed Warhol's early comic strip paintings as "crudely anonymous, out-of-date, tasteless trash," arguing that the artist then shifted to universal brand imagery—Campbell's soup cans, Coca-Cola bottles, and Brillo boxes—motifs that, in Varnedoe's words, existed in a realm "where time stood still."

According to writer Gary Indiana in Andy Warhol & the Can That Sold the World (2008), the November 1963 assassination of President John F. Kennedy marked the moment when Warhol's Campbell's Soup Cans acquired a darker resonance. As Warhol became increasingly associated with the counterculture, the series developed what Indiana describes as an edgy connection to "social upheaval," a day when "America lost its innocence," transforming the soup cans into an emblem of an emblem of a nation in crisis.

== Variations ==
After the success of his original 32 paintings, Warhol continued to explore the Campbell's soup motif in numerous variations. By 1982, he had created more than 100 renderings, ranging in size from 20 inches to 6 feet. Some variations depicted torn or peeling labels, dented cans, or opened lids, extending the imagery beyond the pristine commercial surface. Together with the original 32 canvases, these works are collectively known as the Campbell's Soup Cans series. The earliest soup can painting is believed to be Campbell's Soup Can (Tomato Rice) (1961), executed in ink, tempera, crayon, and oil.

In 1962, Warhol refined his technique, moving from hand painting to stamps, stencils, and eventually silkscreen, using synthetic polymer paint and ink on canvas. The mechanical process introduced slight irregularities—ink buildup, seepage, or misalignment—that became part of the works' character. In many variations, Warhol simplified the can's gold medallion, replacing its detailed allegorical figures with a flat yellow disk, reinforcing the image's graphic flatness. Works featuring torn labels have often been interpreted metaphorically, suggesting impermanence beneath consumer packaging.

The Museum of Modern Art, which owns the 32 original works along with Campbell's Soup I (1968) and Campbell's Soup Cans II (1969) series, identifies original paintings as "acrylic with metallic enamel paint on canvas, 32 panels," and the latter two as "portfolios of ten screen prints." Some sources mistakenly describe the original set of 32 Campbell's Soup Cans as silkscreens, contributing to ongoing confusion—so much so that when the Art Gallery of Ontario acquired Campbell's Soup I, The Globe and Mail called it "the entire, iconic series."

The breadth of the series, its collaborative production, and the high market value of Warhol's work led to the creation of the Andy Warhol Art Authentication Board in 1995 to certify authenticity; it was dissolved in 2012 following costly legal disputes. The cultural significance and financial value of the soup can works has also made them targets of theft. A Campbell's Soup Cans painting estimated to have been worth €35,000 (€43011 in 2023) was stolen from the Andy Warhol Museum of Modern Art in 2015. In 2021, a lithograph from the series was stolen from art curator Gil Traub in Manhattan. Although the thief was identified on security video, the artwork was not recovered.

=== Big Campbell's Soup Can with Can Opener (Vegetable) (1962) ===
Big Campbell's Soup Can with Can Opener (Vegetable) (1962) is an early hand-painted work by Warhol and the only example of his Campbell's soup can paintings to depict a can opener. Executed in early 1962, before Warhol began using silkscreen techniques, it is among his first large-scale depictions of a Campbell's Soup can and appeared in a photograph of his studio published in Time magazine in May 1962. The painting was the first of Warhol's soup can paintings to be shown in a museum when it was included in the exhibition American Paintings and Sculpture from Connecticut Collections at the Wadsworth Atheneum in 1962. The painting has had several notable owners: Emily Hall Tremaine, Ted Ashley, and Barney A. Ebsworth.

=== 200 Soup Cans (1962) ===
Measuring 72 by 100 inches, 200 Soup Cans (1962) is the largest of Warhol's Campbell's soup can paintings and is regarded as a landmark of Pop art. The painting consists of 200 soup cans arranged in ten rows and twenty columns, depicting different Campbell’s varieties. Created as Warhol was transitioning from hand painting to mechanical processes, it was first exhibited at The New Realists: An Exhibition of Factual Painting & Sculpture at the Sidney Janis Gallery in New York in October 1962. The work is in the private collection of John and Kimiko Powers.

=== Colored Campbell's Soup Cans (1965) ===
1965 multi-colored versions from the Milwaukee Art Museum collection

In 1965, Warhol revisited the Campbell's soup can motif in a series of 20 paintings known as Colored Campbell's Soup Cans. Unlike the standardized red-and-white appearance of the original Campbell's Soup Cans, the new paintings reduced the variety of soups represented in the earlier series to a single product, Campbell's tomato soup, while introducing variation through color. Warhol used silkscreen printing and acrylic paint on canvas, and the paintings measure approximately 36 by 24 inches. Nineteen of the twenty paintings are generally identified as surviving. The process for this series included a spray paint base foundation, followed by a "three-screen printing process" and finished by hand with minimal painterliness.

In 2011, L&M Arts in New York exhibited 12 paintings from the series in Andy Warhol: Colored Campbell's Soup Cans, the first exhibition devoted exclusively to the series since its creation.

=== Campbell's Soup I (1968) and Campbell's Soup II (1969) ===
In 1967, Warhol formalized his print operations through Factory Additions. In 1968 and 1969, he issued two editions of ten Campbell's soup can screen prints, each in runs of 250. Campbell's Soup I reproduces the original soup can labels, while Campbell's Soup II features updated, more elaborate designs.

In 2016, seven Campbell's Soup I prints were stolen from the Springfield Art Museum. The Federal Bureau of Investigation offered a $25,000 ($33538 in 2025) reward for information leading to their recovery. The museum ultimately received a $750,000 insurance payout. In 2017, the Art Gallery of Ontario acquired a complete Campbell's Soup I set, becoming the first public collection in Canada to own one. In 2022, climate-change protesters glued themselves to and vandalized a Campbell's Soup I set at the National Gallery of Australia.

An edition of Campbell's Soup II is held by the Museum of Contemporary Art, Chicago, while the Museum of Modern Art in New York also owns a set. Unauthorized reproductions are known as "Sunday B Morning" prints.

=== Unauthorized versions ===
In 1970, Warhol entered into a collaboration in which he facilitated exact duplications of some of his 1960s works by providing the photo negatives, precise color codes, screens, and film matrixes for European screen print production. Warhol signed and numbered one edition of 250 before subsequent, unauthorized, unsigned versions were produced. The unauthorized works were the result of a falling out between Warhol and some of his New York City studio employees who went to Brussels where they produced work stamped with "Sunday B Morning" and "Add Your Own Signature Here". Some of the unauthorized productions bore the markings, "This is not by me, Andy Warhol". Art galleries and dealers market "Sunday B Morning" reprints of several screen print works, including those from the Campbell's Soup can sets.

=== Art market ===
Small Torn Campbell's Soup Can (Pepper Pot) (1962), which sold for $11.8 million in 2006

In 1964, the Campbell's Soup Cans were reportedly offered for $200 ($2076.18 in 2025) each at the Ferus Gallery, though approximately half a dozen were ultimately sold for $100 ($1038.09 in 2025) apiece.

Warhol produced six torn-label Campbell's Soup can paintings, two of which achieved record-setting prices. In 1970, Warhol set a record auction price for a living American artist when Big Campbell's Soup Can with Torn Label (Vegetable Beef) (1962) sold for $60,000 ($497.4 thousand in 2025) at Parke-Bernet. The seller was art collector Peter Brant, according to dealer James Mayor. Some accounts suggest the sale may have been arranged rather than fully competitive. The record was surpassed months later when Warhol's rival Roy Lichtenstein sold Big Painting No. 6 (1965) for $75,000 ($621787 in 2025).

In 1961, Warhol painted a single Campbell's Soup Can on a 20 × 15-inch canvas and gave it to his brother Paul to celebrate the birth of Paul's son. The family eventually auctioned the work on November 13, 2002, at Christie's in New York; it is often regarded as a precursor to the later iconic series.

The market for the soup cans strengthened dramatically in the 2000s. In May 2006, Small Torn Campbell Soup Can (Pepper Pot) (1962) sold for $11,776,000 ($18.81 million in 2025), setting an auction record for the series. The buyer was Eli Broad, and the work now resides in his museum, The Broad. In November 2010, Campbell's Soup Can (Tomato) (1962), which was first shown at the Stable Gallery, sold for $9 million ($13.29 million in 2025) at Christie's.

In 2013, a Hot Dog Bean print from the Campbell's Soup II series sold for $258,046 ($356656 in 2025) in Vienna.

Market performance has fluctuated. In February 2016, amid a softer contemporary art market, a Large Campbell's Soup Can (1964)—previously sold in 2007 and 2008—fetched $7.4 million ($10.93 million in 2025) at Sotheby's, below expectations. Yet the following year, in May 2017, Big Campbell's Soup Can With Can Opener (Vegetable) (1962) achieved $27.5 million ($36.12 million in 2025) at Christie's, reaffirming the enduring market power of Warhol's Campbell's imagery.

== Provence ==
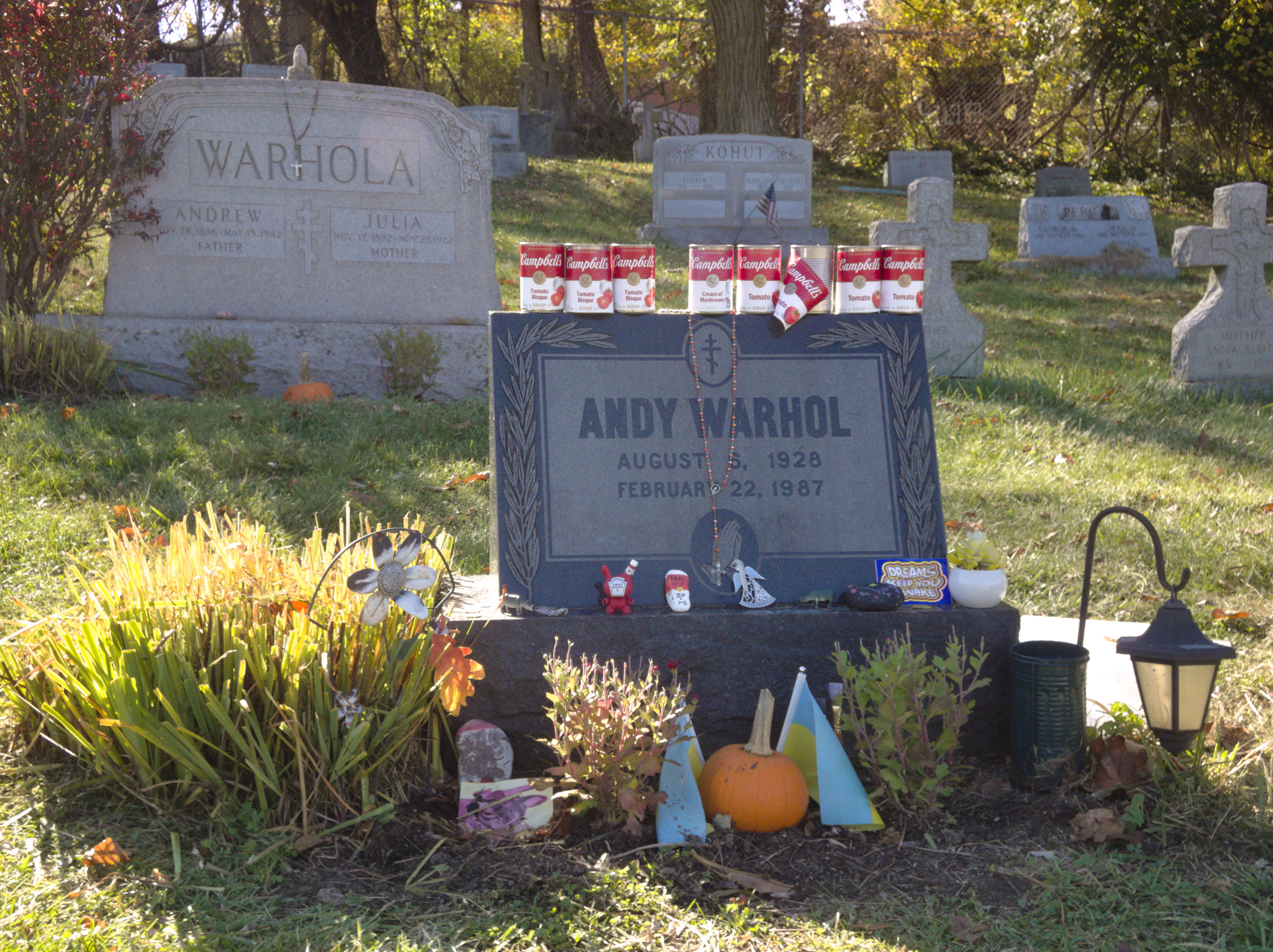
Warhol's grave festooned with Campbell's soup cans at St. John the Baptist Byzantine Catholic Cemetery in Bethel Park, Pennsylvania

Irving Blum made the original 32 canvases available to the public through an arrangement with the National Gallery of Art in Washington, DC, by placing them on permanent loan on February 20, 1987, which was two days before Warhol's death. While at the National Gallery of Art, they were installed in a 4-row, 8-column grid in alphabetical order.

In October 1996, the works were on loan to the National Gallery of Art when the Museum of Modern Art (MoMA) acquired them for approximately $15 million ($30.79 million in 2025). The MoMA attributes the source of funds for this purchase to a wide variety of sources: "Partial gift of Irving Blum Additional funding provided by Nelson A. Rockefeller Bequest, gift of Mr. and Mrs. William A. M. Burden, Abby Aldrich Rockefeller Fund, gift of Nina and Gordon Bunshaft, acquired through the Lillie P. Bliss Bequest, Philip Johnson Fund, Frances R. Keech Bequest, gift of Mrs. Bliss Parkinson, and Florence B. Wesley Bequest (all by exchange)."

From October 2001 to April 2002, the MoMA loaned the work to the Andy Warhol Retrospective, presented at the Neue Nationalgalerie in Berlin and later at Tate Modern in London. When the exhibition traveled to the Museum of Contemporary Art, Los Angeles, the loan was not extended due to the opening of MoMA's new facility in Queens in June 2002.

The MoMA normally exhibits them as a grid arranged by the historical introduction dates of the soup flavors. It has displayed them in various configurations. E.g., in 2015, the exhibition Andy Warhol: Campbell's Soup Cans and Other Works, 1953–1967 marked the first time at MoMA—and only the fourth ever—the series was shown in a single line. The frames and Plexiglas were removed, and the canvases were placed on ledges, allowing them to be viewed like items on supermarket shelves.

== Legacy ==
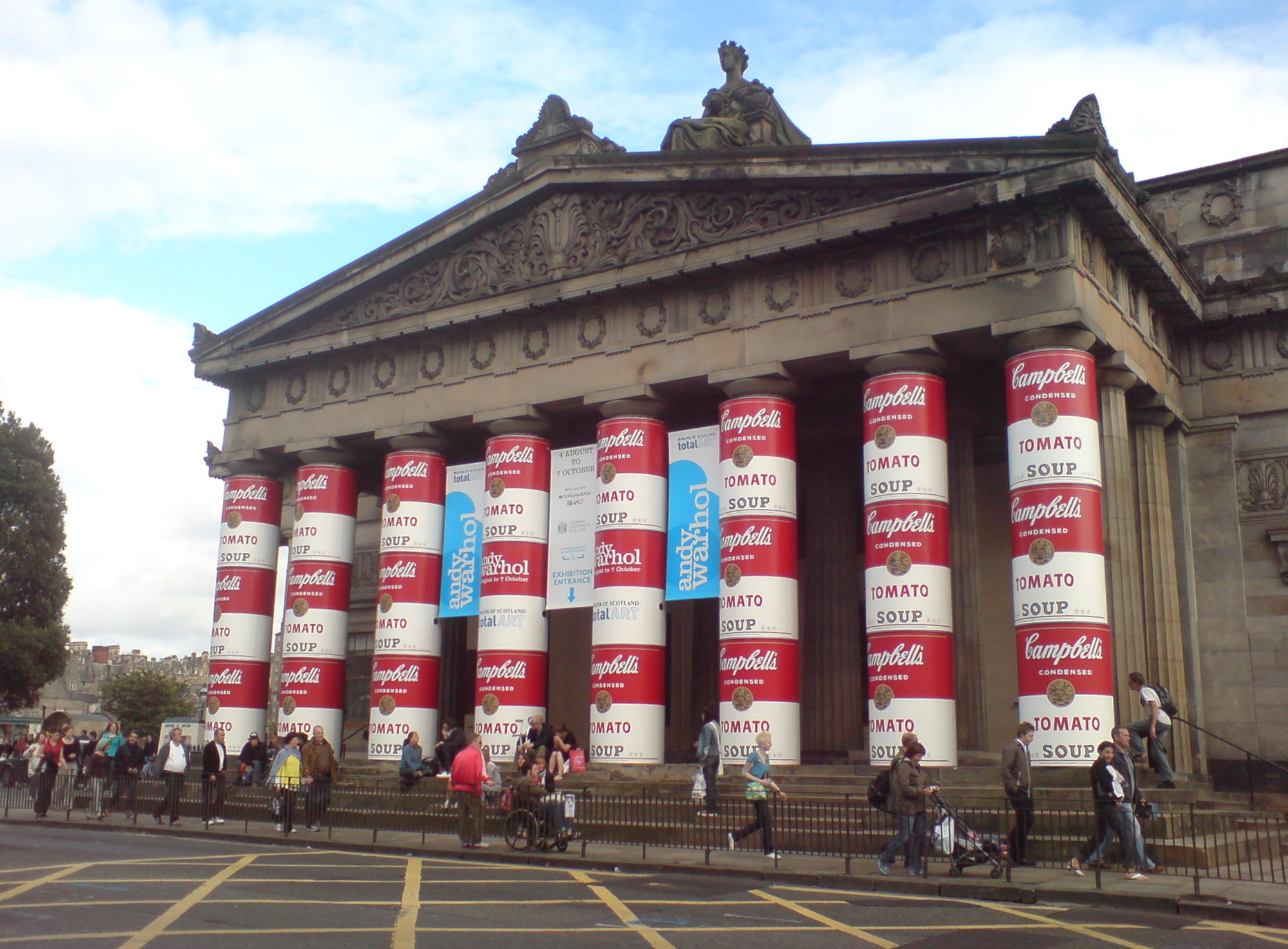
Soup can pillars on the exterior of the Warhol exhibition at the Royal Scottish Academy, marking the 20th anniversary of Warhol's death, 2007

In retrospect, the debut of Warhol's Campbell's Soup Can paintings is regarded as a pivotal moment in the rise of Pop art. At the time, however, it generated little fanfare. Warhol did not attend the opening in Los Angeles, and no reception was held for the July 1962 exhibition at the Ferus Gallery. The work initially attracted modest attention, but it soon gained traction, and Warhol's reputation and influence expanded dramatically. After his death in 1987, The New York Times observed in 1991 that the subsequent years had become an era "dominated by Warhol wanna-bes," emphasizing how thoroughly his aesthetic had permeated contemporary art.

Warhol is widely regarded as the most renowned figure of the Pop art movement, often synonymous with the genre itself. In 1998, The Wilson Quarterly described him as the "most influential visual artist of the last 50 years," highlighting the breadth of his cultural impact beyond painting into media, celebrity culture, and commercial design. Newsweek journalist David Wallace-Wells argued that the soup cans "introduced a mass audience to fine art, and made American painting truly democratic, shattering category distinctions and reshaping aesthetic criteria as dramatically as Marcel Duchamp had with his Fountain."

Initially skeptical of Warhol, Campbell's executives ultimately recognized how his work elevated the brand's visibility and embraced the advertising power it generated. In 1985, Campbell's commissioned Warhol to paint the packaging for its dry soup mixes. The resulting work was unveiled at the Whitney Museum in New York, where it served as the launch of the new product line. In 1993, Campbell's bought a Warhol tomato soup can painting to hang in its corporate boardroom at its headquarters, and by 2012 the company had a licensing agreement with the Warhol estate to use his artwork on a variety of merchandise.

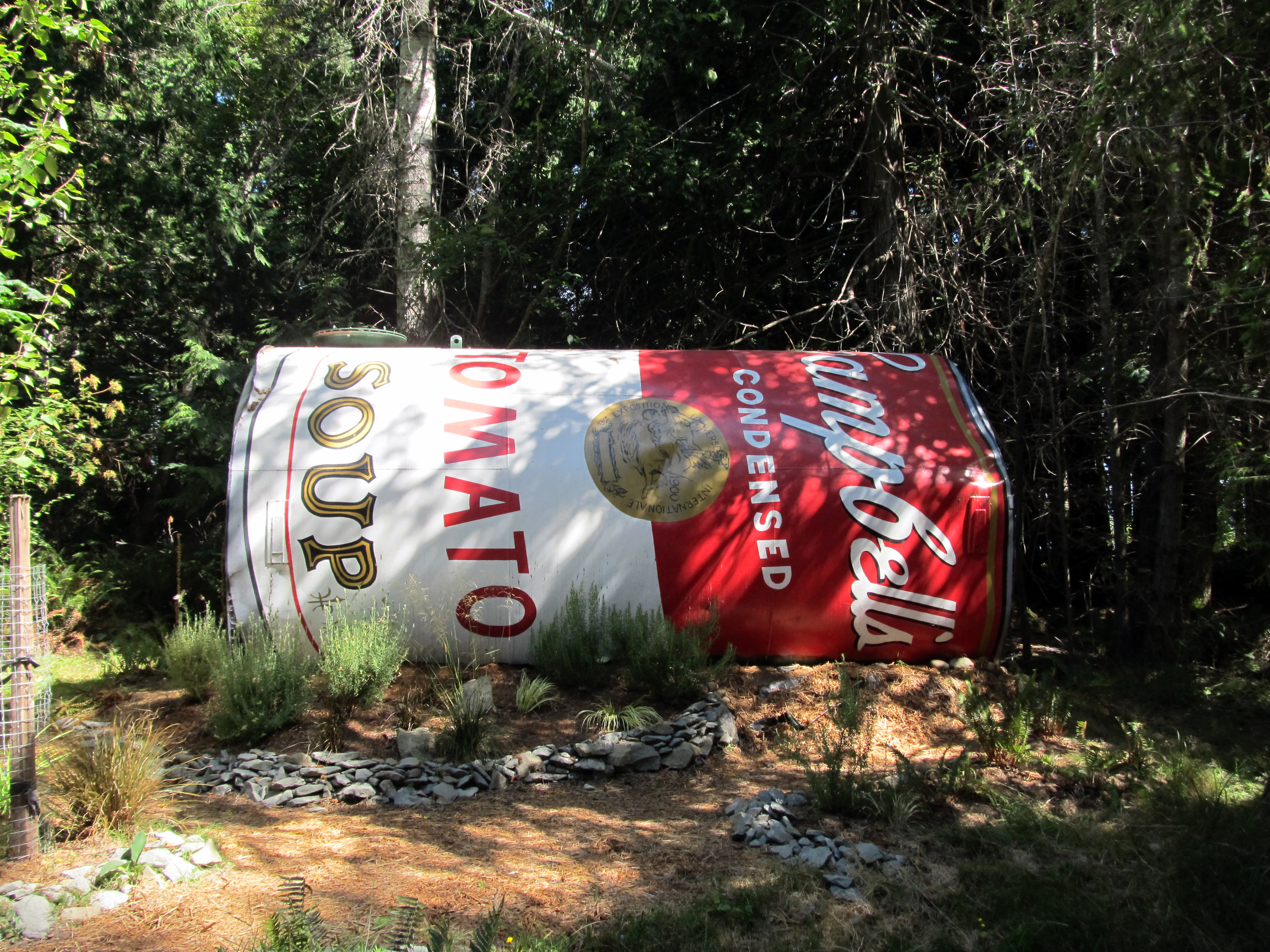
Warhol Tribute (2012) by Roberta Pyx Sutherland on Hornby Island in British Columbia, 2013

In 2007, to mark the 20th anniversary of Warhol's death, the largest exhibition of his work ever presented in Scotland was held at the Royal Scottish Academy in Edinburgh. As part of the commemoration, large-scale images of Campbell's soup cans were wrapped around the Academy's neoclassical columns, transforming the building's façade into a monumental Pop art installation.

In 2012, the Hornby Island Community Arts Council commissioned painter Roberta Pyx Sutherland to transform a dented, rusty tank on the island into a public artwork inspired by Warhol's Campbell's Soup Cans. The piece titled Warhol Tribute was created as a homage marking the 50th anniversary of Warhol's series.

In collaboration with EXMURO, a non-profit producing public art, Canadian art duo Cooke-Sasseville created a large-scale installation as a nod to Warhol. The work titled The Odyssey (2014), comprises a giant Campbell's soup can flanked by three oversized pigeons. The installation was first presented as part of the Passages Insolites exhibition in Québec City in 2014 and 2015, and was later installed at various locations in Ottawa. In 2025, it was displayed in Springfield, Massachusetts, marking the first time the work had been installed in the United States.

=== Influence on artists ===
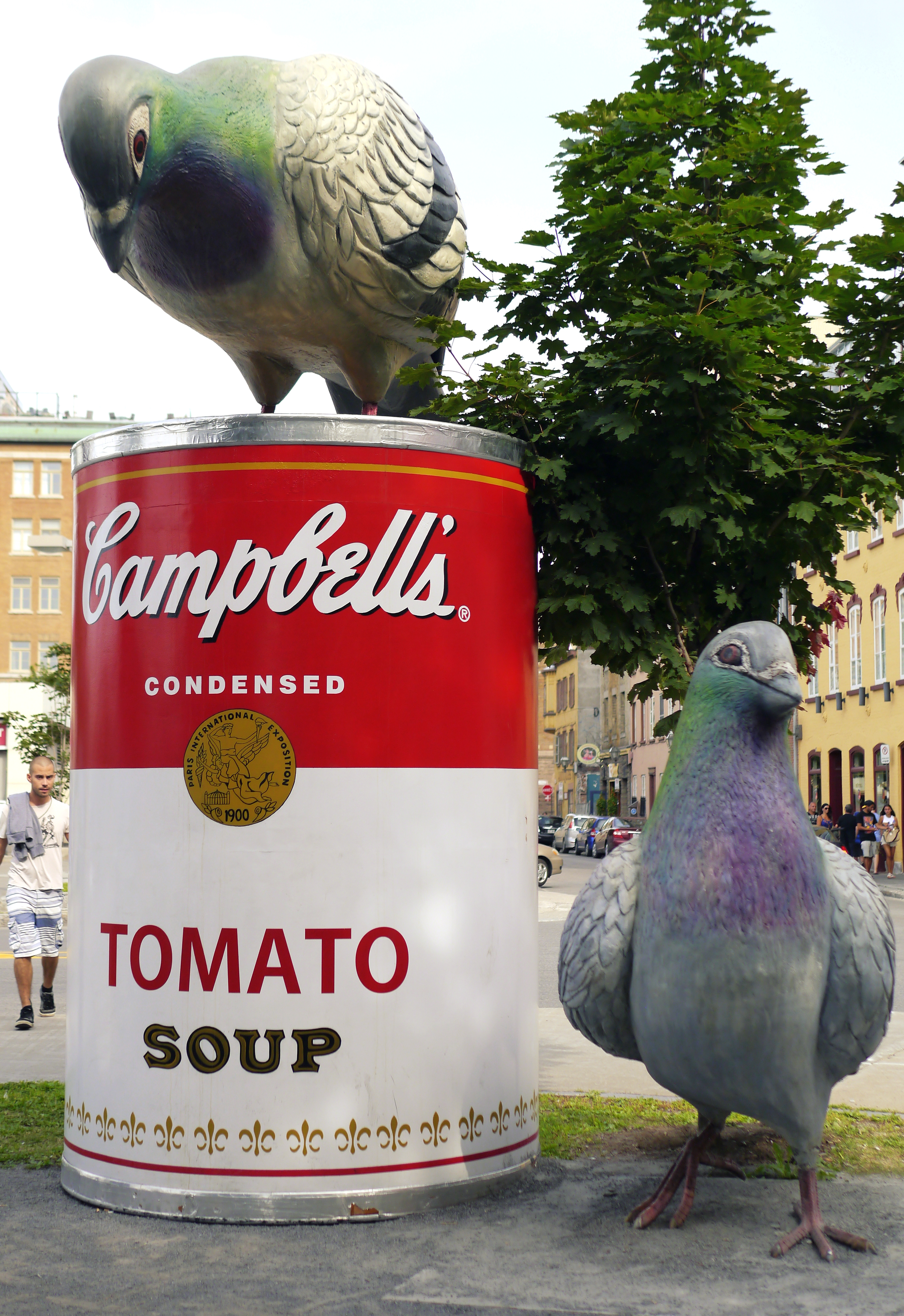
The Odyssey (2014) by Cooke-Sasseville displayed at Place de Bordeaux in Québec, 2015

American artist Richard Pettibone attended Warhol's first exhibition at the Ferus Gallery in 1962, an experience that had a lasting impact on him. He went on to build a career as an appropriation artist and debuted at the Ferus Gallery in 1965, with his reinterpretations of Warhol's Campbell's Soup Cans among his most frequently cited works.

Warhol's imagery also resonated beyond the visual arts. In 1978, music critic Barry Bronson of the Lexington Herald wrote that Warhol had influenced rock music "tremendously" with his Campbell's Soup Cans. He argued that "shock spilled over into the pop arena and characteristics like exaggeration, shock and humor were carried on since by artists wielding guitars instead of brushes."

The impact of his works have extended into street culture as well. In 1979, graffiti artists Fab Five Freddy and Lee Quiñones paid homage to Warhol by spray painting an entire New York City Subway train with images of Campbell soup cans.

In 1994, Campbell's launched the "Art of Soup" contest to influence artists to create renditions of their soup label. The competition drew more than 10,000 entries and was judged by a panel that included Warhol's brother, Paul Warhola. The winner, announced at the Whitney Museum in 1995, was Matthew Balestrieri, an 11-year-old from San Juan Bautista, California, whose artwork was based on Ancient Egypt. In 1997, Campbell's sponsored another "Art of Soup" contest in honor of its 100th anniversary and the 35th anniversary of Warhol's iconic series. More than 5,000 entries were submitted, and Warhol's brother John Warhola was a judge. The first-place winner, Dino Sistilli of Woodbury, New Jersey received a $10,000 ($20.06 thousand in 2025) prize for a sheet of commemorative postage stamps featuring various Campbell soup flavors; his work and other top entries were displayed at the Andy Warhol Museum in Pittsburgh.

Warhol is said to have been an inspiration for artists such as Jeff Koons and Banksy. Koons, in particular, extended Warhol's exploration of art as commodity into the 21st century. According to Irish Arts Review writer Riann Coulter, Neil Shawcross was influenced by Warhol's 1962 presentation of American culture with everyday food packaging in that year when Shawcross moved to Belfast. Shawcross eventually produced an exhibition entitled Letters to Andy after visiting the Andy Warhol Foundation. Louise Lawler also appropriated Campbell's Soup Cans for Soup (2022) as part of her Distorted for the Times series.

== In pop culture ==
Warhol themed promotions

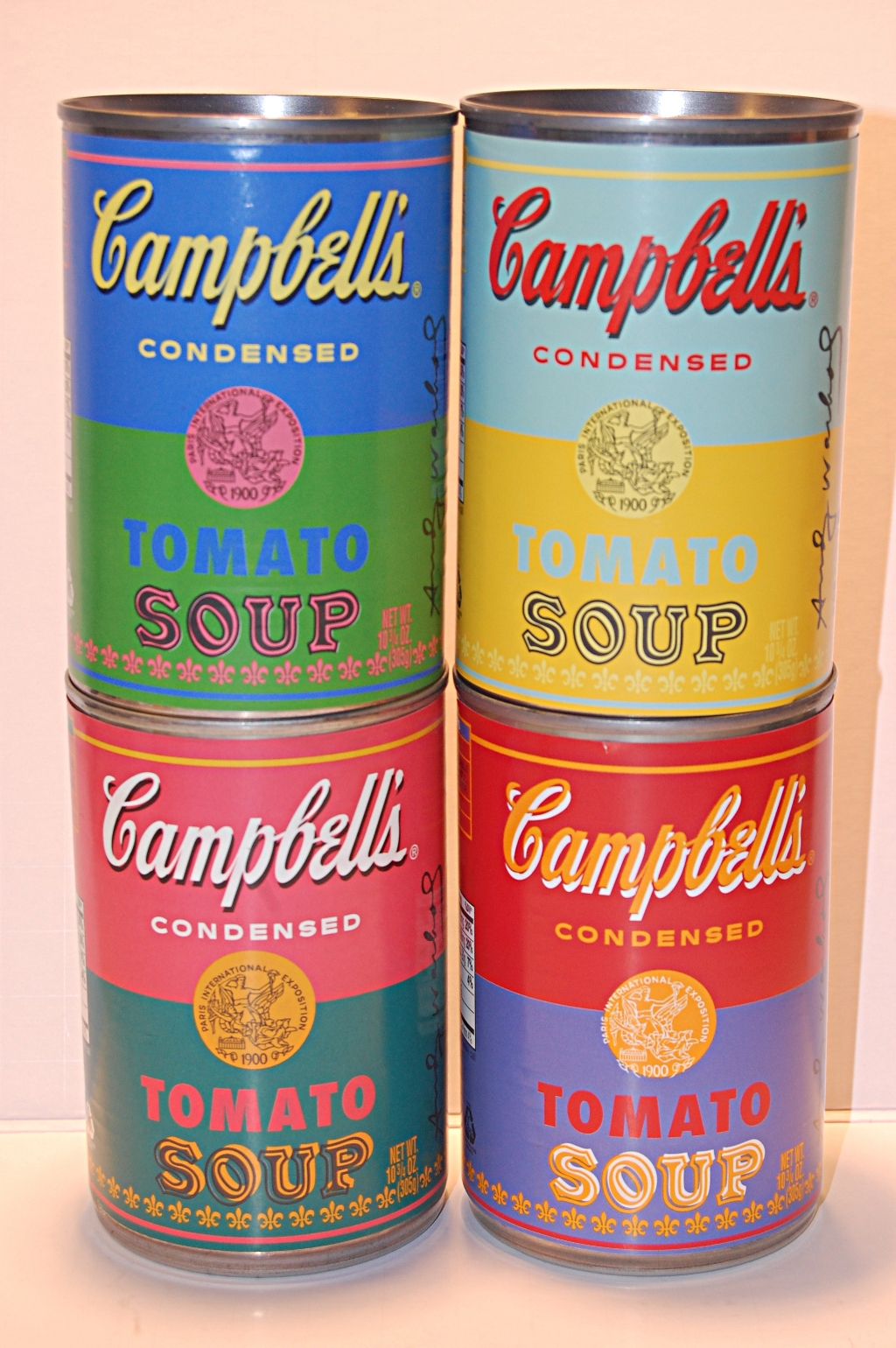
Special edition 50th anniversary Campbell's soup cans, 2012

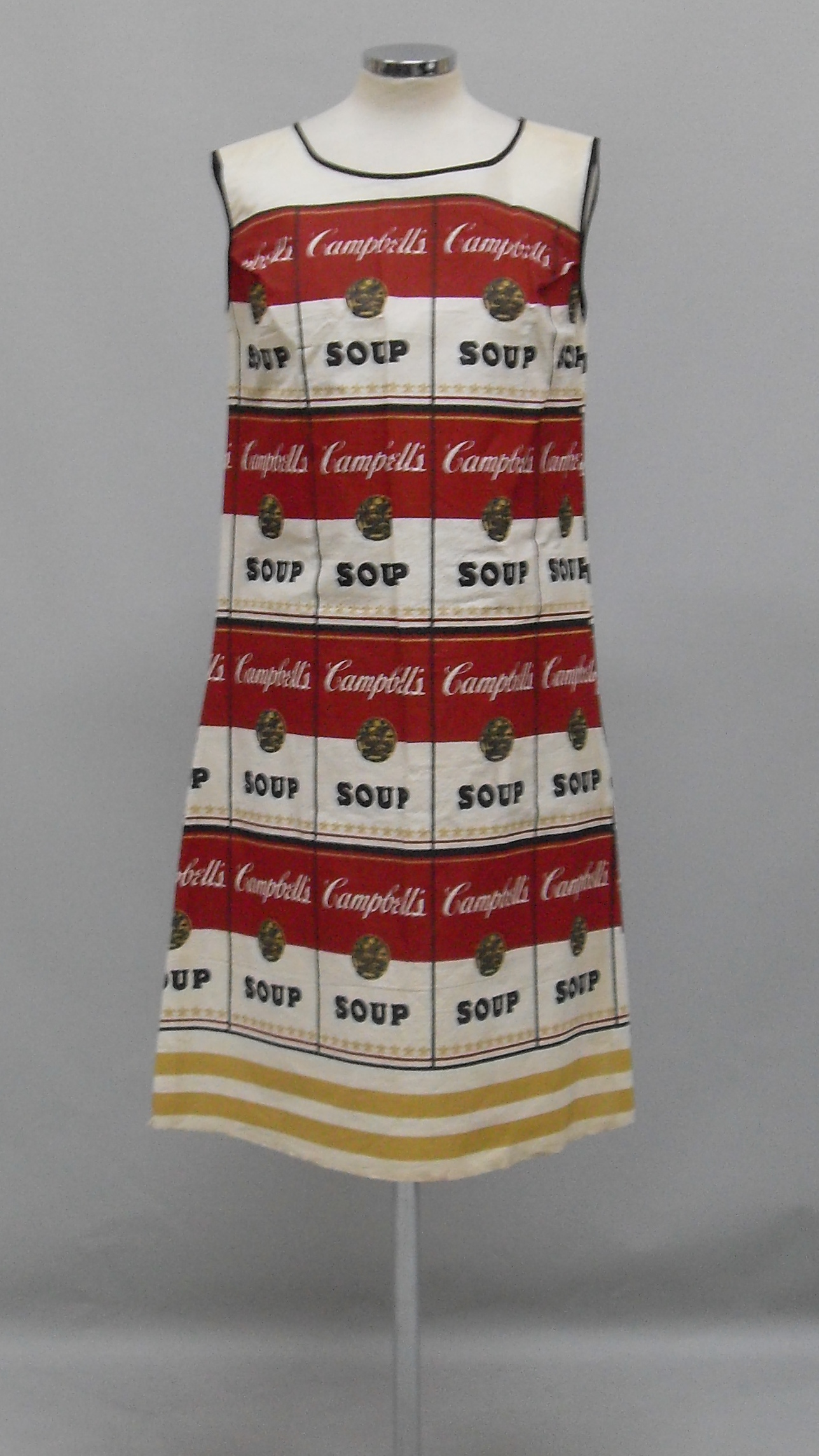
The Souper Dress, 1967

In 1967, Campbell's produced the promotional Souper Dress, which customers could purchase for $1 ($9.66 in 2025) plus two soup can labels. The paper dress—featuring repeating Campbell's soup can graphics—became an iconic example of Pop art crossing into fashion. In 1995, it entered the costume collection of the Metropolitan Museum of Art, one year before the Museum of Modern Art acquired Warhol's Campbell's Soup Cans.

Warhol and his soup cans have also appeared frequently in pop culture. There are several references in the animated sitcom The Simpsons, including the 1991 episode "Brush with Greatness," in which Warhol's Campbell's Soup Can is seen in an art gallery, and the 1999 episode "Mom and Pop Art," which depicts Warhol tossing soup cans at Homer Simpson. An Andy Warhol character appears holding a can of Campbell's tomato soup in a dance club in the 1997 film Austin Powers: International Man of Mystery. In the 2015 film Minions, the character Herb Overkill (voiced by Jon Hamm) references Warhol's soup cans while joking about stealing one because it expressed his love of soup in painted form. The series is also prominently featured in Andy Warhol: A Documentary Film, directed by Ric Burns.

Commercial collaborations have further extended the imagery's reach. In 2004, Campbell's had collaborated with Giant Eagle on a four-pack of Warhol-inspired cans. By December 2004, The New York Times reported that the cans were retailing for $20 ($34.09 in 2025) at the East Village, Manhattan shop Howdy Do.

In 2012, the brands Vans and Supreme released footwear and apparel featuring Campbell's soup labels, a nod to Warhol's work. That same year, Campbell's marked the 50th anniversary of the series by partnering with Target Corporation to sell four limited-edition Warhol-inspired tomato soup can designs in U.S. stores; 1.2 million cans sold at $0.75 ($1.05 in 2025) each.

In 2015, the Andy Warhol Foundation for the Visual Arts partnered with Converse to produce a special-edition Chuck Taylor All-Star collection featuring Campbell's Soup can prints, Warhol-inspired advertisements, and newspaper motifs. The collaboration echoed Warhol's own practice in the 1980s, when he customized his personal Chuck Taylors with hand-drawn designs.

In 2021, Campbell Company of Canada partnered with the Andy Warhol Foundation for the Visual Arts to mark the 60th anniversary of Warhol's Campbell's Soup Cans with four limited-edition Pop art–inspired soup labels released across Canada. The campaign invited Canadian artists and consumers to create and share their own Pop art works online, with a curated selection of submissions featured in a digital gallery hosted by Refinery29.

== See also ==
- 1962 in art
