= Summer '68 =

Song by Pink Floyd

from the album Atom Heart Mother
- A-side: "Julia Dream" (Japan)
- Released: October 1970
- Recorded: December 1968 – January 1969, 5–20 July 1970
- Studio: Abbey Road Studios, London
- Genre: Baroque pop; psychedelic pop
- Length: 5:28
- Label: Harvest
- Songwriter: Richard Wright
- Producers: Pink Floyd; Norman Smith

Official audio
- "Summer '68" on YouTube

"Summer '68" is a song by English rock band Pink Floyd on their 1970 album Atom Heart Mother.

== Recording ==
Written and sung by Richard Wright, "Summer '68" was recorded at Abbey Road Studios in July 1970. Its lyrics describe Wright's meeting with a groupie in 1968.

On 4 December 1968, an incomplete version of this song, titled "One Night Stand", was started at Abbey Road Studios. The band kept working on it until 16 December, and it was eventually scrapped by the band on 16 January 1969 after a session at Abbey Road.

== Reception ==
In a retrospective review for the Atom Heart Mother album, Irving Tan of Sputnik Music gave "Summer '68" a positive review, describing it as "the catchiest and most-accessible track on the album." Tan really enjoyed Wright's vocals, the "bombastic trumpet solo breaks", and believed the track had "a groovy chorus".

In another retrospective review for the Atom Heart Mother album, IGN described "Summer '68" as "a catchy, fast and happy pop tune written and sung by Richard Wright" that's "one of the few songs Wright has ever done for Pink Floyd and it's actually pretty fine."

== Personnel ==
- Richard Wright – lead and backing vocals, piano, Hammond organ
- David Gilmour – acoustic guitar, classical guitar, backing vocals
- Roger Waters – bass guitar
- Nick Mason – drums, percussion

with:

- Abbey Road Session Pops Orchestra – brass
