= 200 Soup Cans =

1962 painting by Andy Warhol

- Artist: Andy Warhol
- Year: 1962
- Medium: Synthetic polymer paint on canvas
- Movement: Pop Art
- Dimensions: 182.9 cm × 254.6 cm (72.0 in × 100.2 in)
- Owner: John and Kimiko Powers

200 Soup Cans, also known as 200 Campbell's Soup Cans, is a 1962 painting by American artist Andy Warhol. The painting is Warhol's largest work depicting Campbell's soup cans and reflects his interest in repetition. It consists of 200 images of Campbell's soup cans arranged in a 20-by-10 grid. The serial images were created through a combination of mechanical and hand-applied processes.

== Background ==
During the 1950s, Andy Warhol established himself in New York as a successful commercial artist, particularly through his advertising work and illustrations of women's shoes. By 1961, he had begun transitioning toward fine art, producing paintings based on comic strips and newspaper advertisements. After his early comic-based works drew comparisons with artist Roy Lichtenstein, Warhol sought a more distinctive direction within the emerging Pop art movement. Warhol sought ideas from friends, including curator Henry Geldzahler, who encouraged him to paint ordinary, commercially available objects that people encountered in everyday life. Another friend, art dealer Muriel Latow, suggested money as a subject, prompting Warhol to explore Campbell's soup cans, dollar bills alongside Coca-Cola bottles, and movie stars.

Warhol began painting Campbell's soup cans in late 1961 at his home studio at 1342 Lexington Avenue in New York. The subject offered a readily recognizable commercial image that could be repeated in different sizes, arrangements, and formats. Rather than treating the soup can as a traditional still-life object, Warhol presented it as a mass-produced consumer product whose familiar packaging could be transformed into fine art through repetition.

By early 1962, Warhol was producing numerous variations of Campbell's soup cans, ranging from individual large-scale cans to compositions containing multiple repeated cans. These included paintings of 100 and 200 cans as well as related still lifes.

== Technique and production ==
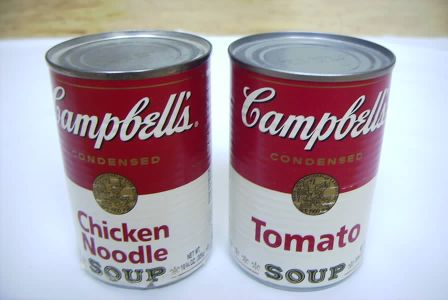
Campbell's Chicken Noodle Soup and Campbell's Tomato Soup

The painting was made during a transitional period in Warhol's practice as he sought to find ways around painting or drawing with his hands. He experimented with stenciling and rubber stamp techniques before beginning silkscreening became his principal method for producing serial images. This reduced manual irregularities, leaving only mechanical variations such as ink buildup or slight misalignments.

== Description ==
Measuring approximately 72 x 100¼ inches (182.9 x 254.6 cm), 200 Soup Cans is the largest of Warhol's soup can paintings. It consists of 200 depictions of Campbell's soup cans shown frontally and closely spaced in a grid of ten rows and twenty columns. The cans vary in flavor, allowing differences in their labels to emerge within an otherwise repetitive composition.

== Interpretation ==
Art historian David Bourdon wrote that "the repetition resulted in an allover pattern" that encouraged viewers to scan the work as a whole, "almost as if it were an abstraction," because visual activity was evenly distributed across the grid. He argued that the grid suggested "mass production and uniformity" while carrying commercial overtones that Warhol welcomed. Bourdon also saw repetition as a means of distinguishing Warhol's work from Roy Lichtenstein, helping him "get out from under the other artist's lengthening shadow." He described repetition as "a central element of Warhol's aesthetic, and he went on to regiment shipping labels, airmail stamps, dollar bills, and Coca-Cola bottles."

Jonathan Flatley extends this understanding of repetition by focusing on Warhol's use of stamps and stencils to produce images that appeared nearly identical while retaining differences corresponding to the varieties of soup. The resulting repetition shifts the work away from conventional representation: rather than depicting 200 individual soup cans, the painting presents a series of images mechanically derived from the same commercial model. Flatley asserts that this process is better understood as simulation than representation, since each image imitates the appearance of the Campbell's can, making the images similar both to their common model and to one another. He concluded, "As Foucault (optimistically) wrote in the final lines of his short book on Magritte, 'A day will come when, by means of similitude relayed indefinitely along the length of a series, the image itself, along with the name it bears, will lose its identity. Campbell, Campbell, Campbell, Campbell.'"

Art critic Edward Lucie-Smith considered 200 Soup Cans "a truly significant Pop Art picture" because of what it foreshadowed for the future of art. He argued that the work's significance extended beyond its specifically Pop elements, linking it to the established work of Jasper Johns, particularly Johns' Numbers (1964). Lucie-Smith suggested that both works anticipated the Minimal and Conceptual art movements that would challenge Pop later in the 1960s. He also saw Warhol's deliberate choice of a "supremely banal" subject as anticipating the "cynicism and emptiness" of avant-garde art in the late 1980s and early 1990s, particularly in the work of Jeff Koons.

== Exhibitions ==
200 Soup Cans was first exhibited at the Sidney Janis Gallery in New York as part of The New Realists: An Exhibition of Factual Painting & Sculpture from October to December 1962. The painting was displayed alongside Warhol's Big Campbell's Soup Can 19¢ (Beef Noodle) and Do It Yourself (Flowers).

200 Soup Cans was subsequently exhibited at the Solomon R. Guggenheim Museum in New York as part of Six Painters and the Object from March to June 1963. The exhibition traveled to the Los Angeles County Museum of Art in Los Angeles (July 24–August 25, 1963), Minneapolis Institute of Arts in Minneapolis (September 3–29, 1963), University of Michigan Museum of Art in Ann Arbor (October 9–November 3, 1963), Rose Art Museum at Brandeis University in Waltham (November 18–December 29, 1963), Carnegie Institute in Pittsburgh (January 17–February 23, 1964), Columbus Gallery of Fine Arts in Columbus (March 8–April 5, 1964), and The Art Center in La Jolla (April 20–May 17, 1964).

The painting has been included in exhibitions of Warhol's work and in presentations of the John and Kimiko Powers collection. It was shown at the Gagosian Gallery's New York exhibition Pop Art: The John and Kimiko Powers Collection in 2001. In 2013, it was exhibited in American Pop Art: From the John and Kimiko Powers Collection at The National Art Center in Tokyo.

== See also ==
- 1962 in art
