= Campbell's Soup I =

1968 artwork by Andy Warhol

- Artist: Andy Warhol
- Year: 1968
- Type: Screenprint on paper
- Dimensions: 91.8 cm × 61.3 cm (36.1 in × 24.1 in)
- Location: Several institutions including, National Gallery of Australia and Art Gallery of Ontario, Canberra

Campbell's Soup I is a 1968 series of screenprints by American artist Andy Warhol, comprising 250 portfolios of ten prints each. Held in several major museum collections, the series revisits the format of his earlier Campbell's Soup Cans (1961–62), presenting a different Campbell's Soup can variety in each image. It was followed by Campbell's Soup II (1969), which adopts a similar structure but features updated, more elaborate label designs, whereas Campbell's Soup I reproduces the original soup can labels.

== Background ==
Pop artist Andy Warhol's work consistently reflects his awareness of consumerism in American society, a theme embodied in both his subject matter and his use of silkscreen printing. By adopting a mechanical, reproducible process, he aligned his art with mass-produced commodities, depicting subjects such as celebrities—treated as cultural products—and everyday consumer goods like Campbell's Soup, Coca-Cola, and Brillo. Among these, the Campbell's soup can became one of the most enduring symbols of 1960s Pop art. Earlier works such as Campbell's Soup Can on Shopping Bag (1964) reinforced its democratic associations through large editions, low cost, and the use of an everyday, disposable object.

In 1967, Warhol founded Factory Additions to publish large editions of screenprints based on his best-known works. By then, Pop art had become a major commercial enterprise, and Warhol's international fame made self-publishing both an artistic and economic strategy. It also enabled him to be more "machine-like" which he aspired to be. Warhol once explained his approach: "the reason I'm painting this way is that I want to be a machine, and I feel that whatever I do and do machine-like is what I want to do."

Between 1967 and 1970, Factory Additions released several portfolios of ten screenprints in editions of 250, produced with commercial printers to ensure near-identical results for mass distribution. Works such as Campbell's Soup I (1968) and Campbell's Soup II (1969) exemplify this approach, with their polished, impersonal surfaces closely resembling advertising imagery and contrasting with the more expressive qualities of his earlier paintings. These portfolios helped establish Warhol as one of the leading American print publishers of the late 1960s.

== Production ==
Campbell's Soup I, followed by Campbell's Soup II, revisits the format of his Campbell's Soup Cans (1961–62), presenting a different soup variety in each image. In these screenprints, Warhol pushed the mechanical quality of the medium to an extreme, minimizing any trace of the artist's hand. The images closely resemble commercial advertising, approximating the look of supermarket displays and fulfilling Warhol's aim to "be a machine." Compared to his earlier paintings, however, the absence of irregularities and "mistakes" reduces the tension between uniformity and individuality that had characterized his initial soup can works.

The series also reflects shifts in commercial design: Campbell's Soup I reproduces the original soup can labels, while Campbell's Soup II introduces more elaborate, updated versions, underscoring the continual reinvention of even familiar consumer products.

Each portfolio in Campbell's Soup I consists of ten screenprints, each measuring 91.8 × 61.3 cm (36.1 × 24.1 in). The ten varieties are: Black Bean, Chicken Noodle, Tomato, Onion (Made with Beef Stock), Vegetable (Made with Beef Stock), Beef with Vegetables and Barley, Green Pea, Pepper Pot, Consommé (Beef, Gelatin Added), and Cream of Mushroom.

Warhol produced 250 such portfolios, aiming for a highly finished, mechanized aesthetic. The sets were available for purchase at the Factory, and were printed by the Salvatore Silkscreen Company in New York City.

=== Unauthorized prints ===
In 1970, Warhol authorized a European screen-printing collaboration by providing photo negatives, color codes, screens, and film matrices for exact reproductions of some of his 1960s works. He signed and numbered an edition of 250, after which unauthorized versions were produced by former New York studio employees in Brussels. These reprints, associated with the "Sunday B Morning" mark, included reproductions of works from the Campbell's Soup I and Campbell's Soup II series.

== Collection ==
Campbell's Soup I is held in several major public collections, including the National Gallery of Australia, the Museum of Modern Art, Norton Simon Museum and Art Gallery of Ontario.

In 2016, seven prints were stolen from the Springfield Art Museum, prompting the Federal Bureau of Investigation to offer a $25,000 reward for information leading to their recovery. Estimates of their value varied widely: Writing for Artnet News, art critic Blake Gopnik described them as relatively modest, at around $30,000 each, while the National Public Radio suggested prices of up to $45,000, with certain variants reaching as high as $100,000. The museum ultimately received a $750,000 insurance settlement.

In 2017, the Art Gallery of Ontario acquired a complete set, becoming the first institution in Canada to hold the series in full.

On November 8, 2022, climate activists briefly targeted a version of Campbell's Soup I on display at the National Gallery of Australia, gluing themselves to protective glass and vandalizing the display without damaging the work. The protest was intended to draw attention to fossil fuel subsidies.

== Art market ==
In October 2017, Campbell's Soup I set a record for the series when a complete set sold for $850,000 at Sotheby's to a British art dealer.

In March 2018, Sotheby's sold a complete set for £849,000 in London.
