= Campbell's Soup II =

1969 artwork by Andy Warhol

- Artist: Andy Warhol
- Year: 1969
- Type: Screenprint on paper
- Dimensions: 89 cm × 58.6 cm (35 1/16 in × 23 1/16 in)
- Location: Museum of Modern Art, Museum of Contemporary Art, Chicago, Milwaukee Art Museum

Campbell's Soup II is a 1969 series of screenprints by American artist Andy Warhol, comprising 250 portfolios of ten prints each. Held in several major museum collections, the series revisits the format of his earlier Campbell's Soup Cans (1961–62), presenting a different Campbell's Soup variety in each image. It builds on the preceding Campbell's Soup I (1968) but is distinguished by its use of updated, more elaborate soup can labels. The prints closely resemble mass-produced commercial images—akin to supermarket displays—realizing the machine-like aesthetic he had sought in his earlier paintings.

== Production ==
Following Campbell's Soup I (1968), Pop artist Andy Warhol produced 250 new ten-print portfolios in Campbell's Soup II (1968). The series reiterates the format of his original Campbell's Soup Cans (1961–62), presenting a different soup variety in each image. Here, however, Warhol pushed the mechanical nature of screenprinting further, minimizing any visible trace of the artist's hand. As he explained, "the reason I'm painting this way is that I want to be a machine, and I feel that whatever I do and do machine-like is what I want to do." In contrast to the subtle irregularities of his 1962 paintings, these later portfolios are more uniform, lacking the handmade "mistakes" that once disrupted the illusion of identical mass production.

Each portfolio consists of ten prints: Tomato Beef Noodle O's, Chicken 'n Dumplings, Vegetarian Vegetable, Clam Chowder, Old fashioned vegetable made with beef stock, Scotch Broth, Cheddar Cheese, Oyster Stew, Golden Mushroom, and Hot Dog Bean. The cans are uniformly centered and rendered with greater graphic density than in Campbell's Soup I, incorporating additional slogans and promotional text. These differences are particularly evident in varieties such as Hot Dog Bean, Vegetarian Vegetable, and Tomato Beef Noodle O's. Subtle use of shadow and reflected light on the tin lids introduces slight variation, lending each image a degree of visual distinction within an otherwise standardized format.

The portfolios were printed in New York City by the Salvatore Silkscreen Company and published by Factory Additions. There are 26 artist's proofs signed in ballpoint pen verso. They approximate the dimensions of each screenshot composition at 31.875 by 18.875 inches (81.0 cm × 47.9 cm) on a sheet of 35.0625 by 23.0625 inches (89.1 cm × 58.6 cm), while the Museum of Contemporary Art, Chicago rounds these dimensions at 35 by 23 inches (88.9 cm × 58.4 cm).

=== Unauthorized prints ===
In 1970, Warhol supplied production materials—including photographic negatives, color specifications, screens, and film matrices—to facilitate European screen-print reproductions of several works from the 1960s. He signed and numbered an edition of 250, but additional unauthorized versions were subsequently produced in Brussels by former members of his New York studio. Known as "Sunday B Morning" prints, these reproductions included works from the Campbell's Soup I and Campbell's Soup II series.

== Collections ==
The work is in several public collections, including the Museum of Modern Art, Museum of Contemporary Art, Chicago, and the Milwaukee Art Museum.

== Art market ==
Warhol gifted Dr. Giuseppe Rossi—the surgeon who saved his life after the 1968 shooting—a $1,000 check along with a complete set of ten Campbell's Soup II screenprints. The check later bounced, but Rossi retained the prints, which proved far more valuable. After his death in 2016, his family sold the works at Christie's in New York, where they fetched between $16,250 and $37,500 each.

As of July 29, 2022, the record price for a screenprint from this series was the 2013 sale of Hot Dog Bean soup for $258,046 ($356,656 in 2025) in Vienna. Following a falling out between Warhol and some former employees, the "Sunday B Morning" fiasco has led to unauthorized production of his work from his own intellectual property, including elements of this set.
