= If (Pink Floyd song) =

Song by Pink Floyd

Song by Pink Floyd

from the album Atom Heart Mother
- Published: World Copyrights
- Released: 2 October 1970 (UK); 10 October 1970 (US)
- Recorded: 12 June – 21 July 1970
- Studio: Abbey Road Studios, London
- Genre: Folk rock; progressive folk
- Length: 4:31
- Label: Harvest
- Songwriter: Roger Waters
- Producers: Pink Floyd, Norman Smith (executive producer)

Official audio
- "If" on YouTube

"If" is a song by English rock band Pink Floyd on their 1970 album Atom Heart Mother.

== Writing ==
Written and sung by Roger Waters, like "Grantchester Meadows" before it, "If" carries on a pastoral and folky approach, but instead deals with introspection. The song is in the key of E major.

== Live ==
The song was performed live at a John Peel session on 16 July 1970, at BBC's Paris Theatre, London. Waters performed it on several occasions, during the 1984–85 'Pros and Cons' tour, and in support of Radio K.A.O.S. in 1987. For these performances, "If" was expanded with additional lyrics and chord sequences. The song was later played by Nick Mason's Saucerful of Secrets in 2018, 2019, 2022 and 2024 in a medley with the Atom Heart Mother suite. A recording is included on their 2020 live album Live at the Roundhouse.

== Reception ==
In a review for the Atom Heart Mother album on release, Alec Dubro of Rolling Stone gave "If" a negative review, calling the song "English folk at its deadly worst. It's soft and silly." Dubro said the same for "Fat Old Sun". Rolling Stone would later praise the song in 2007, however, writing "Roger Waters' pastoral ballad on this flawed album was a moving examination of the terror of isolation; Floyd were finally rooting their astral travels in true songwriting." Critic Mike Cormack notes that the song has "a quite radical lyric, neatly reversing the patriotic bombast and public-school derring-do of the Rudyard Kipling poem of the same name for the recognition (and thus valuing) of fragility and otherness", and that the "reversal of the values of patriarchal, class-bound Britain towards something more inclusive is one of Waters' most enduring strengths as a songwriter". Stephen Deusner of Paste described "If" as one of Roger Waters' best compositions. Irving Tan of Sputnik Music believes "If" contains "very introspective lyrics that end up making a memorable outing", but also believed the track was not as well-written as some of his later and earlier pieces. Tan also believed the track was reminiscent of "Grantchester Meadows", another Waters-penned track from Ummagumma a year before.

== Personnel ==
- Roger Waters – lead and backing vocals, classical guitar, bass guitar
- David Gilmour – slide electric guitar
- Richard Wright – Hammond organ, piano
- Nick Mason – drums
