= Cow (Warhol) =

1966 wallpaper design by Andy Warhol

- Artist: Andy Warhol
- Year: 1966
- Medium: Screen print on wallpaper
- Dimensions: 46 by 28 inches (117 cm × 71 cm)
- Location: The Andy Warhol Museum, North Shore, Pittsburgh

Cow is a 1966 screen print by American artist Andy Warhol. Created for his exhibition at the Leo Castelli Gallery in New York City, Warhol had an entire room covered in wallpaper featuring his pink-and-yellow Cow prints. He produced a series of four Cow prints from 1966 to 1976.

== Background ==
According to Warhol, the inspiration for the cow image came from art dealer Ivan Karp:

"Why don't you paint some cows, they're so wonderfully pastoral and such a durable image in the history of the arts." (Ivan talked like this.) I don't know how "pastoral" he expected me to make them, but when he saw the huge cow heads — bright pink on a bright yellow background — that I was going to have made into rolls of wallpaper, he was shocked. But after a moment he exploded with: "They're super-pastoral! They're ridiculous! They're blazingly bright and vulgar!" I mean, he loved those cows and for my next show we papered all the walls in the gallery with them.

The cow image is believed to have come from E.S. Harrison's book, Judging Dairy Cattle.

Some art critics have suggested Warhol may have appropriated the idea from Yayoi Kusama's One Thousand Boats Show (1963). In this installation work, Kusama wallpapered the gallery with 999 identical images of a boat sculpture.

== Exhibitions ==
Warhol's April 1966 show at the Leo Castelli Gallery in New York consisted of Cow prints in one room, and a second room with Warhol's silver helium-filled Clouds.

At Warhol's request, the pink and yellow Cow wallpaper was used as the backdrop to cover all the walls for his 1971 retrospective at the Whitney in New York.

== Critical reception ==
In a 1966 ARTnews review, David Antin interpreted Warhol's Cow wallpaper as an exploration of how "an image is a proposition about reality." He described the repeated, fluorescent cow heads as "recognizable" yet "banal," noting that they could appear "funny or vicious" or even like "sorrowing clowns." Antin argued that Warhol was "the master of a communication game" in which meaning "flickers back and forth," producing unstable and contradictory responses in the viewer.

Art historian and critic Barbara Rose interpreted Cow as a commentary on the nature of art collecting and the character of the institutions where art is displayed. In a review of Warhol's 1971 retrospective show at the Whitney, she observed that cows are a common subject of genre paintings that people display in their homes, and that the wallpaper made the Whitney look like "a boutique". She continued: "Of course the museum has been a boutique for a long time, and people have been treating paintings like wallpaper even longer. But Andy spells it out with his usual cruel clarity."
