= Factory Additions =

Printmaker and publisher in New York City

Factory Additions was the business established by Andy Warhol in 1967 for publishing and printmaking. Some of the first "Additions" include the silkscreen Marilyn Monroe portfolio, and a silkscreen Addition of "Flowers", and series of silkscreens based on his Campbell's Soup Can labels. Campbell's Soup Cans I consisted of a set of 10 silkscreens produced in an addition of 250.
