= Colored Campbell's Soup Cans =

1965 Andy Warhol paintings

- Artist: Andy Warhol
- Year: 1965
- Medium: Acrylic and silkscreen ink on canvas
- Movement: Pop Art
- Dimensions: 91.4 cm × 61 cm (36.0 in × 24 in)

Colored Campbell's Soup Cans is a series of paintings by American artist Andy Warhol, created in 1965. The series depicts Campbell's Tomato Soup cans in varied color combinations, departing from the standardized red-and-white appearance of Warhol's earlier soup can paintings. The series comprised 20 paintings, of which 19 are identified as surviving.

== Background ==
Pop artist Andy Warhol first became widely associated with Campbell's soup in 1962 through his series of 32 hand-painted canvases, each depicting a different soup flavor. The works transformed a commonplace commercial product into a subject of fine art and became among the defining works of the Pop art movement.

By late 1962, Warhol had increasingly adopted silkscreen printing to increase productivity and achieve greater consistency in his paintings. The Colored Campbell's Soup Cans continued his interest in repetition and consumer culture while placing greater emphasis on color variation, reducing the 32 varieties represented in the earlier series to a single subject: Campbell's Tomato Soup.

== Technique and production ==
Warhol used a combination of silkscreen printing and acrylic paint on canvas to produce the series. He first applied a spray-painted ground in a vivid hue before adding the details of the soup can through a three-screen printing process. The first screen reproduced the top band, replacing Campbell's traditional bright red with a color such as periwinkle blue; the second rendered the seal in a contrasting color such as green; and the third added the black outlines. Warhol then applied additional details and colors by hand with acrylic paint, including the yellow Campbell's script and other lettering.

== Description ==
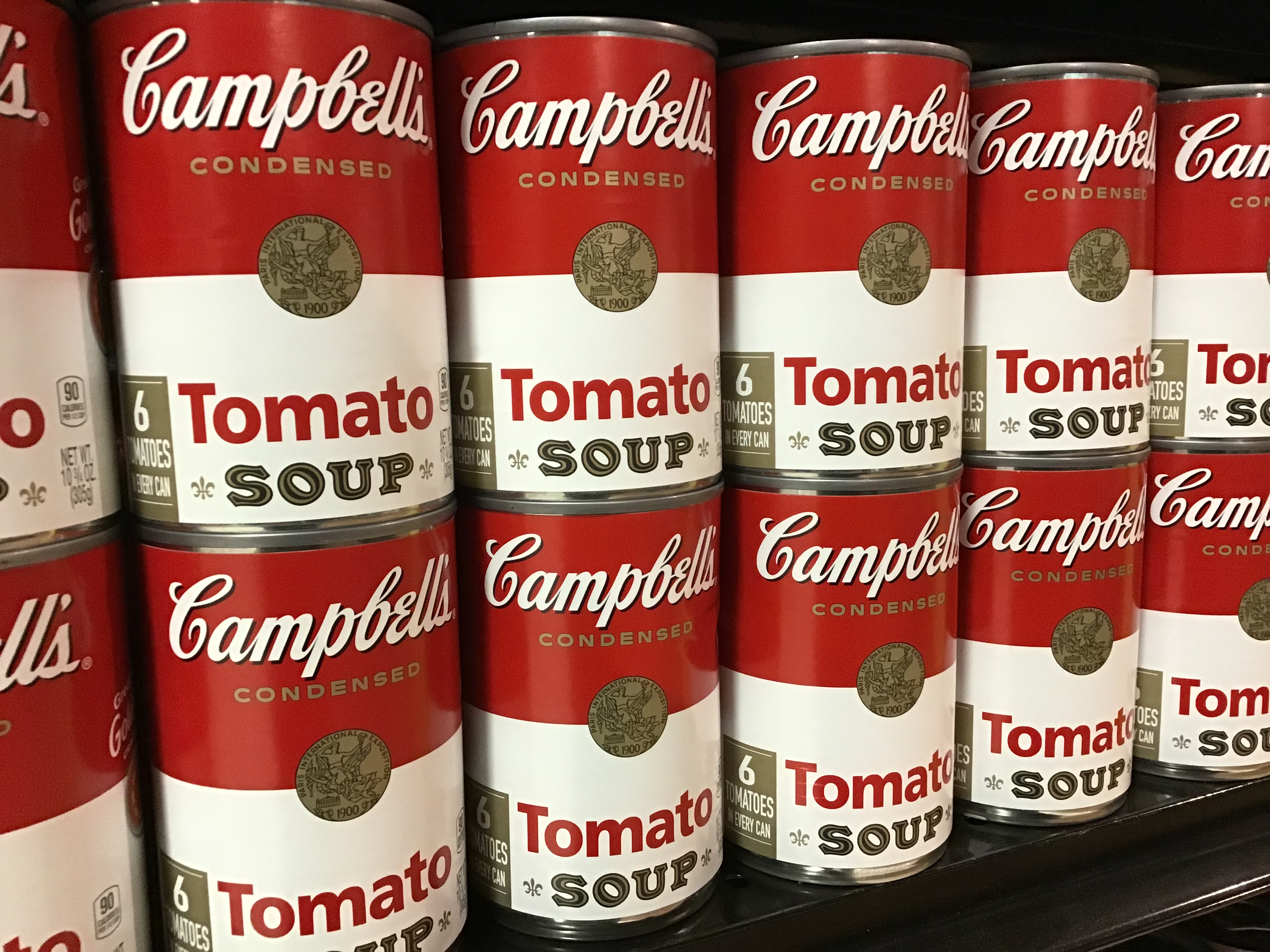
Campbell's Tomato Soup

Measures approximately 36 x 24 inches (91 x 61 cm), each painting depicts a Campbell's Tomato Soup can against a monochrome ground. Although the recognizable structure of the Campbell's label remains essentially unchanged, Warhol replaced its customary red-and-white packaging with bold and often unexpected color combinations. The palettes vary from canvas to canvas, incorporating shades of orange, purple, green, blue, red, and tan. These variations transform the familiar commercial label into a highly stylized composition, making each painting visually distinct.

== Exhibitions ==
Individual paintings from the series subsequently entered private and institutional collections and were included in exhibitions of Warhol's work.

The series was included in Warhol's major 1970 retrospective, which opened at the Pasadena Art Museum and subsequently traveled to the Museum of Contemporary Art in Chicago, the Stedelijk Van Abbemuseum in Eindhoven, the Musée d'Art Moderne de Paris, and the Tate Gallery in London, before closing at the Whitney Museum of American Art in New York in 1971.

In 2003, Four Colored Soup Cans were included in American Pop Icons, an exhibit of work by eight artists in the Pop art movement, at the Guggenheim Hermitage Museum at the Venetian Resort-Hotel-Casino in Las Vegas.

In 2011, twelve paintings from the series were brought together for the exhibition Andy Warhol: Colored Campbell's Soup Cans at L&M Arts in New York, held from April 21 through June 11. It was the first exhibition devoted exclusively to the series since its creation. The exhibition brought together works from private and institutional collections, including loans from the Menil Collection and the Milwaukee Art Museum.

== Critical reception ==
In the San Francisco Examiner, art critic Thomas Albright noted that the series' combinations of "boldly harmonized, decorator colors" diminished the parodic effect of the soup cans, suggesting that they could instead be seen as "parodies of the earlier paintings."

Writing in The New York Times, art critic Ken Johnson praised the series for its "ravishing range of tropical colors." He contrasted the paintings with the mechanical repetition of Warhol's earlier soup cans, which he interpreted as a commentary on standardization and industrialized consumerism. Johnson observed that the shift to varied color schemes reflected the broader "upsurge of joyous optimism signified most conspicuously in art by a dazzling flood of color in all forms of visual expression" in mid-1960s. Johnson concluded that each painting "looks fresh and new every time you go back to it. The series should be installed permanently in a Warhol chapel to offset the existentialist gloom of Rothko's."

== Interpretation ==
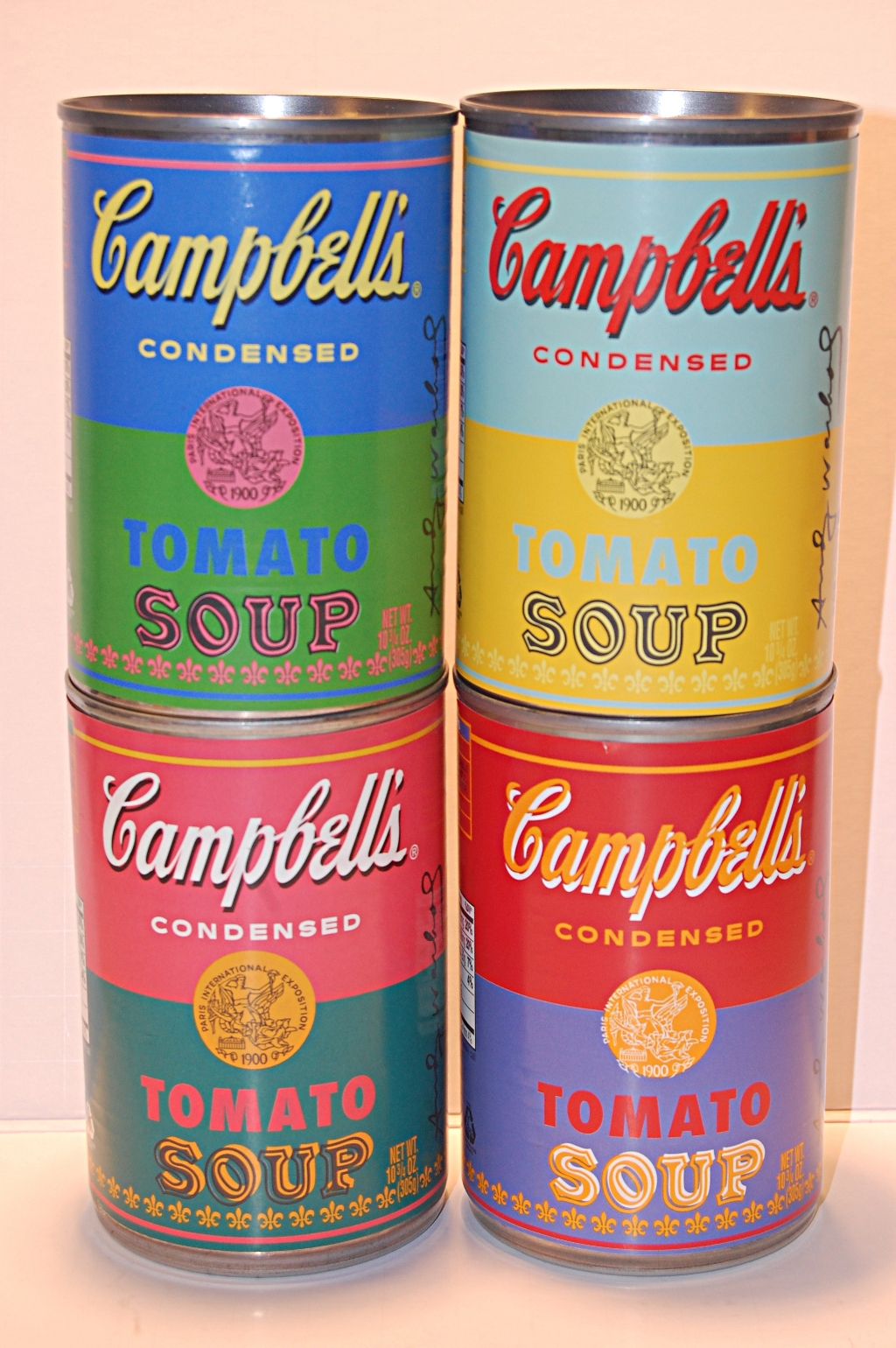
Special edition 50th anniversary Campbell's Tomato Soup, 2012

Art critic David Bourdon viewed the Colored Campbell's Soup Cans as a continuation of Warhol's established motif rather than a significant departure from it. He noted that the "arbitrary hues of the 'fauve' soup cans" were the principal novelty of his paintings, which otherwise offered little that was substantially new during a period when he was focused on filmmaking.

Curator Sarah Kelly Oehler affirmed that "commercialized auras of Warhol's soup paintings are inextricably linked to the mass production and marketing of American food in the 1960s. She relates Warhol's use of "graphic imagery" to his earlier career as a commercial illustrator and his stated desire to become a "machine." Oehler argues, however, that the colored soup cans complicate this mechanistic interpretation because they "mimic the form even as they reject the status of an exact replica through their unexpected color combinations." Oehler asserts that in "a rejection of the aggressive painterly gestures of the Abstract Expressionists, he tightly controlled the presentation of his artistic hand, squelching the flamboyance of brushwork" in favor if silkscreening.

== In pop culture ==
In 2012, Campbell's marked the 50th anniversary of Warhol's original Campbell's Soup Can series by partnering with Target Corporation to sell four limited-edition tomato soup can designs inspired by the 1965 series in U.S. stores; 1.2 million cans sold at $0.75 each.

In 2016, the Andy Warhol Foundation for the Visual Arts partnered with the Skateroom to produce a special-edition collection featuring 8 Colored Campbell's Soup Can designs.
