= David Bourdon =

American writer (1934–1998)

David Bourdon (October 15, 1934 – March 27, 1998) was an American art critic, editor, and author. Bourdon was a pioneering writer on the Minimalist movement and was deeply active in the avant-garde New York art scene of the 1960s. He also wrote about the Earth Art movement in the late 1960s and 1970s and contributed to several magazines, including Life, Artforum International, Art in America, Arts Magazine, Time, and Vogue. Among his books were studies of the artists Christo, Alexander Calder, Niki de Saint-Phalle, and Andy Warhol. He was also the former president of the United States section of the International Association of Art Critics.

== Biography ==
Bourdon was born in Los Angeles, California, on October 15, 1934. He received a Bachelor of Science degree from Columbia University in 1961. Following graduation, he began working as a journalist and art critic, contributing to magazines like Time, Artforum International, Art in America, and Arts Magazine. He served as an editor at Life from 1966 to 1971, associate editor at Saturday Review from 1972 to 1974, senior editor at Geo from 1981 to 1983, and senior features editor at Vogue from 1983 to 1986. He was The Village Voice's art critic from 1964 to 1966 and 1974 to 1977. He was also the president of the United States section of the International Association of Art Critics.

Bourdon's books included analyses of Christo (1972), Alexander Calder (1980), and Andy Warhol (1989). According to his book on Warhol, which was a thorough insider's account of Warhol's career, Bourdon helped Warhol create a number of his 1963 Elvis Presley silkscreen prints. He was a friend of Warhol's and appeared in his experimental film Batman Dracula (1964). Warhol's film Blue Movie (1969) was filmed in Bourdon's Greenwich Village apartment.

His last book, Designing the Earth (1995), explored how humans have shaped their surroundings using stone and earth. He had gotten active with groups like the World Wildlife Fund and People for the Ethical Treatment of Animals in his later years.

Bourdon died at age 63 from esophageal cancer at Simi Valley Hospital in Simi Valley, California, on March 27, 1998. He was survived by his parents, David and Marilyn Bourdon; a brother, Gary Bourdon, and two sisters, Beverley Post and Diane Bourdon. A memorial service was held at St. Francis Xavier Church in Manhattan on April 30, 1998.

== Legacy ==
Bourdon's friend, the artist Les Levine, was the executor of his estate. Levine donated the David Bourdon papers to the Smithsonian Institution and the Museum of Modern Art.

Painter Sylvia Sleigh's 1969 portrait of Bourdon was gifted to the Museum of Modern Art from her estate.
