= Moss Mansion =

Historic building in Montana, US

Coordinates: 45.7796°N 108.5160°W

- Preston B. Moss House
- U.S. National Register of Historic Places
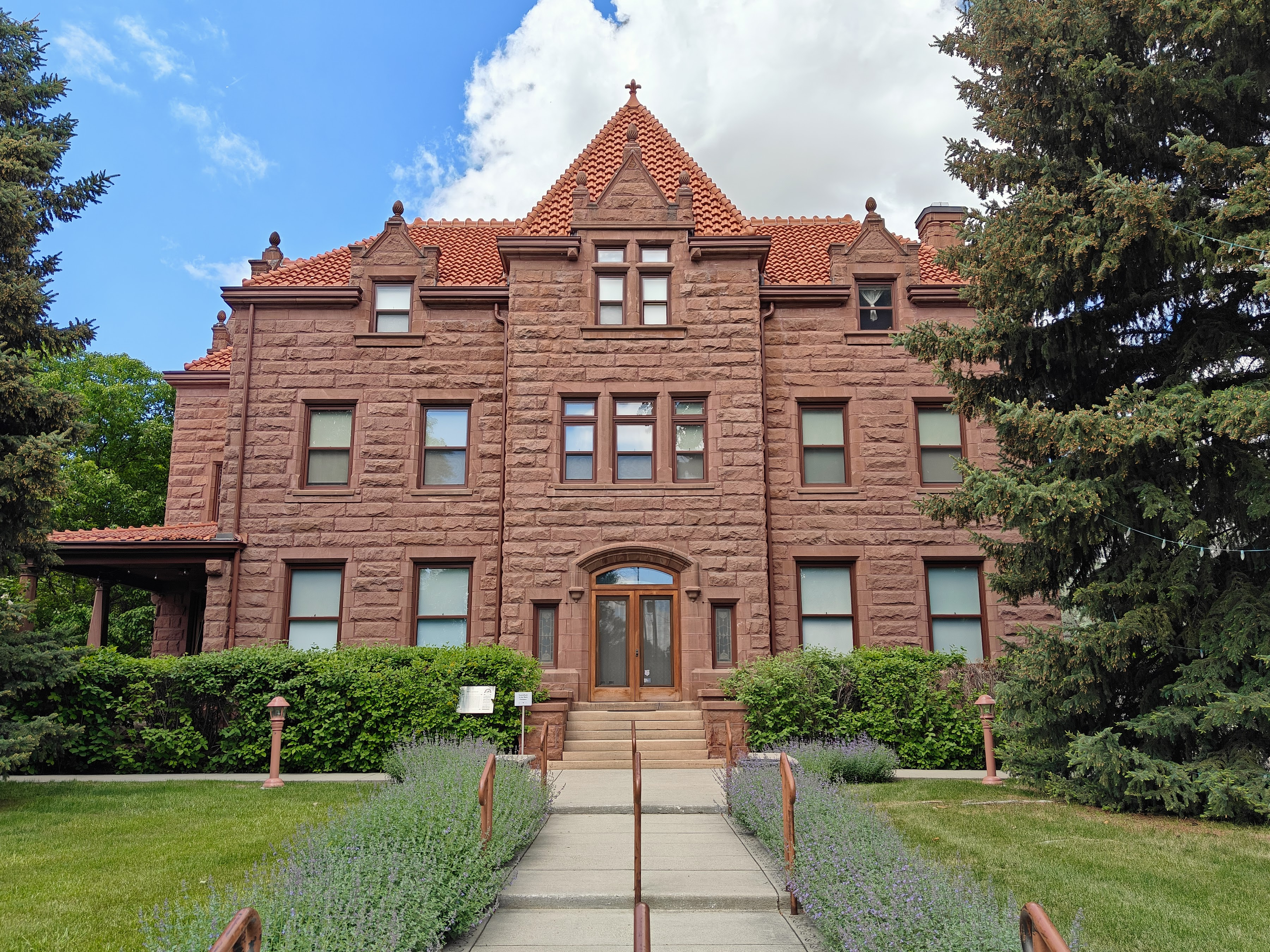

- Location within Montana Location within the United States
- Location: 914 Division St, Billings, Montana
- Area: 2 acres (0.81 ha)
- Built: 1903
- Architect: Hardenbergh, H.J.; Gagnon, E.H.
- Architectural style: English Renaissance
- NRHP reference No.: 82003181
- Added to NRHP: April 30, 1982

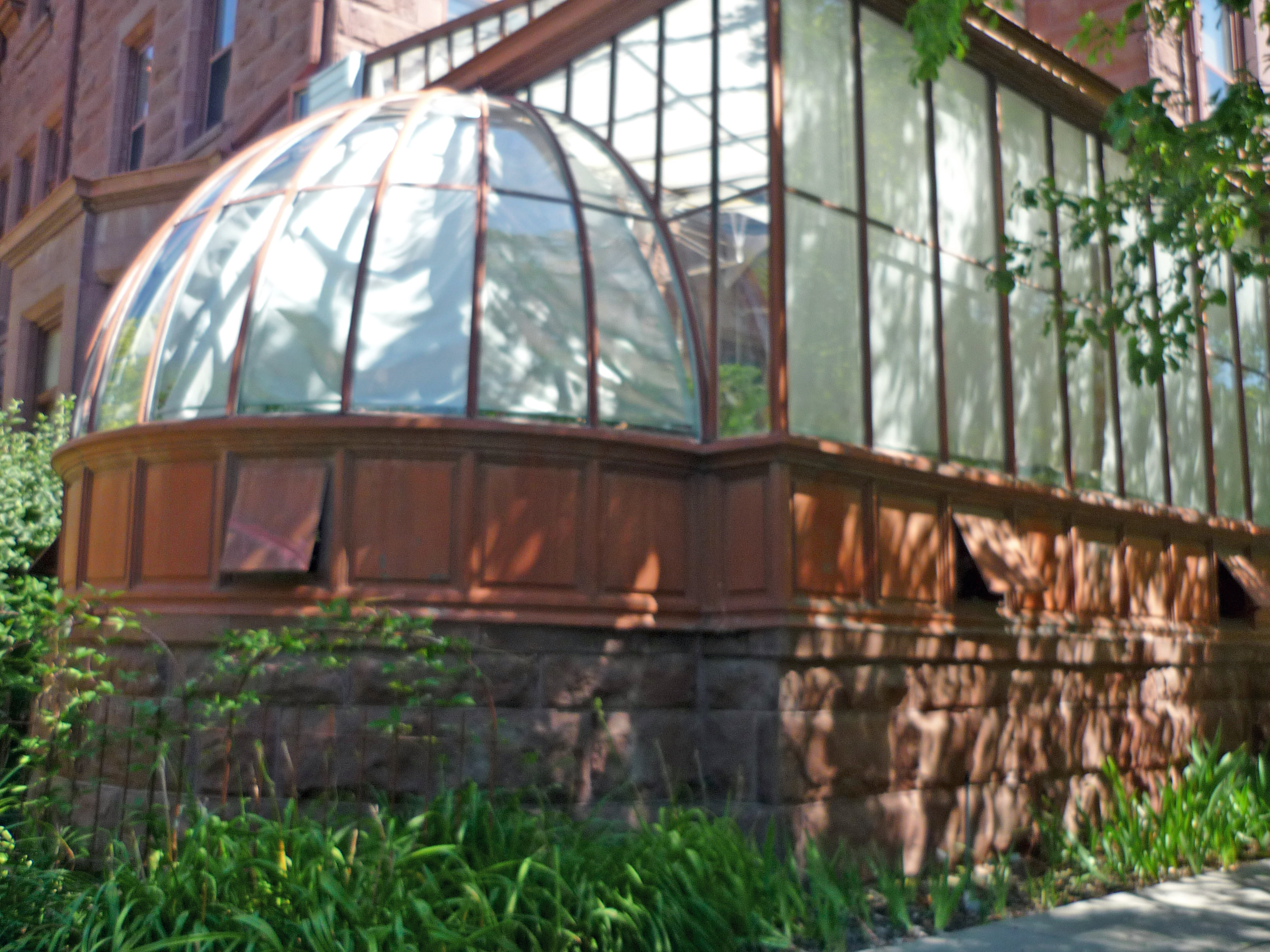
Solarium at Moss Mansion

The Moss Mansion Historic House Museum is located at 914 Division Street in Billings, Montana, United States. It is a red-stone mansion built in 1903 by Preston Boyd Moss (P.B. Moss) and his wife, Martha Ursula Woodson Moss (Mattie). Mr. and Mrs. Moss moved to Billings from Paris, Missouri where they complained “[t]here was more happening at midnight than at noon.”

== History ==
Moss Mansion was inhabited solely by Mr. and Mrs. Moss, their six children (Woodson Jackson, Kula, Melville Hollingsworth, Preston Boyd Moss, Jr., David Hickman Moss III and Virginia), and 3 servants from the time of construction until 1984 at which time a community effort was organized to save the building. Melville Moss insisted that the home stay in the family, and she lived in her home until she died in 1984 at the age of 88. The house was built for a cost of $105,000, compared to a national average of $5,000. It is a three-story single family dwelling with a basement and an attached solarium. It has 28 rooms, and is 60 feet (18 m) square. It rises 45 feet (14 m) into the air. The house is built with red sandstone from Lake Superior, and incorporates a mixture of styles from French Rococo to Moorish. The roof is made of over 10,000 Conosera tiles by Ludowici, and was fully removed and reinstalled in 1988.

The high-end interior decoration includes wood paneling, walls with gold threading, marble fireplaces, columns and even a vintage intercom system, all of which are original to the home. In addition the house is furnished with the original fixtures, furniture, drapes, and carpets. There is much of the Moss children's furniture that has been returned to the home for posterity. Many pieces of eldest daughter Kula's furniture, quilts and needlepoint adorn the home as well as a harp representative of their second daughter Melville's pride and joy. Matriarch Martha's paintings and china patterns are featured throughout much of the main floor. Each room in the house had a distinct theme and function designated by Martha Moss. These themes have been preserved and in some cases recreated to preserve the authenticity of the home .

The Mansion is listed on the National Register of Historic Places and is owned by the city of Billings and the state of Montana. Visitors can view the residence during self-guided tours or one-hour guided tours of the lower three floors. The top floor has been converted to storage and office space for year-round staff and volunteers. Seasonal exhibits are also featured. The Moss Mansion was designed by the famous New York City architect Henry Janeway Hardenbergh, who also designed the original Waldorf-Astoria, Plaza Hotel, The Dakota, Willard Hotel, and Fairmont Copley Plaza. In 1986 the Billings Preservation Society, a non-profit organization, obtained proprietorship of the Moss Mansion through a lease agreement with the family and separate option agreement. The museum is self-funded through tours, events and weddings, annual fundraisers, memberships, and donations.

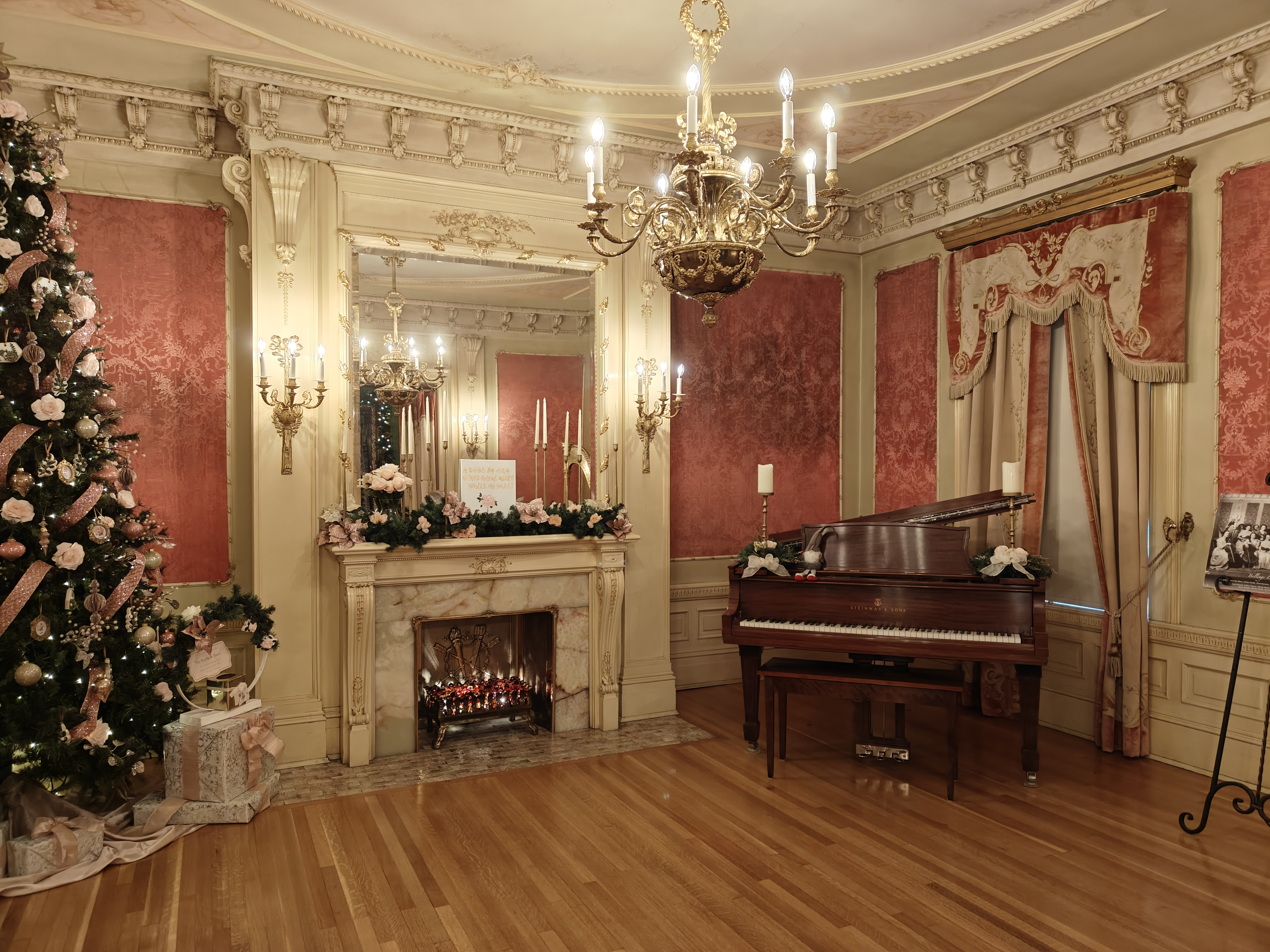
Front Parlor

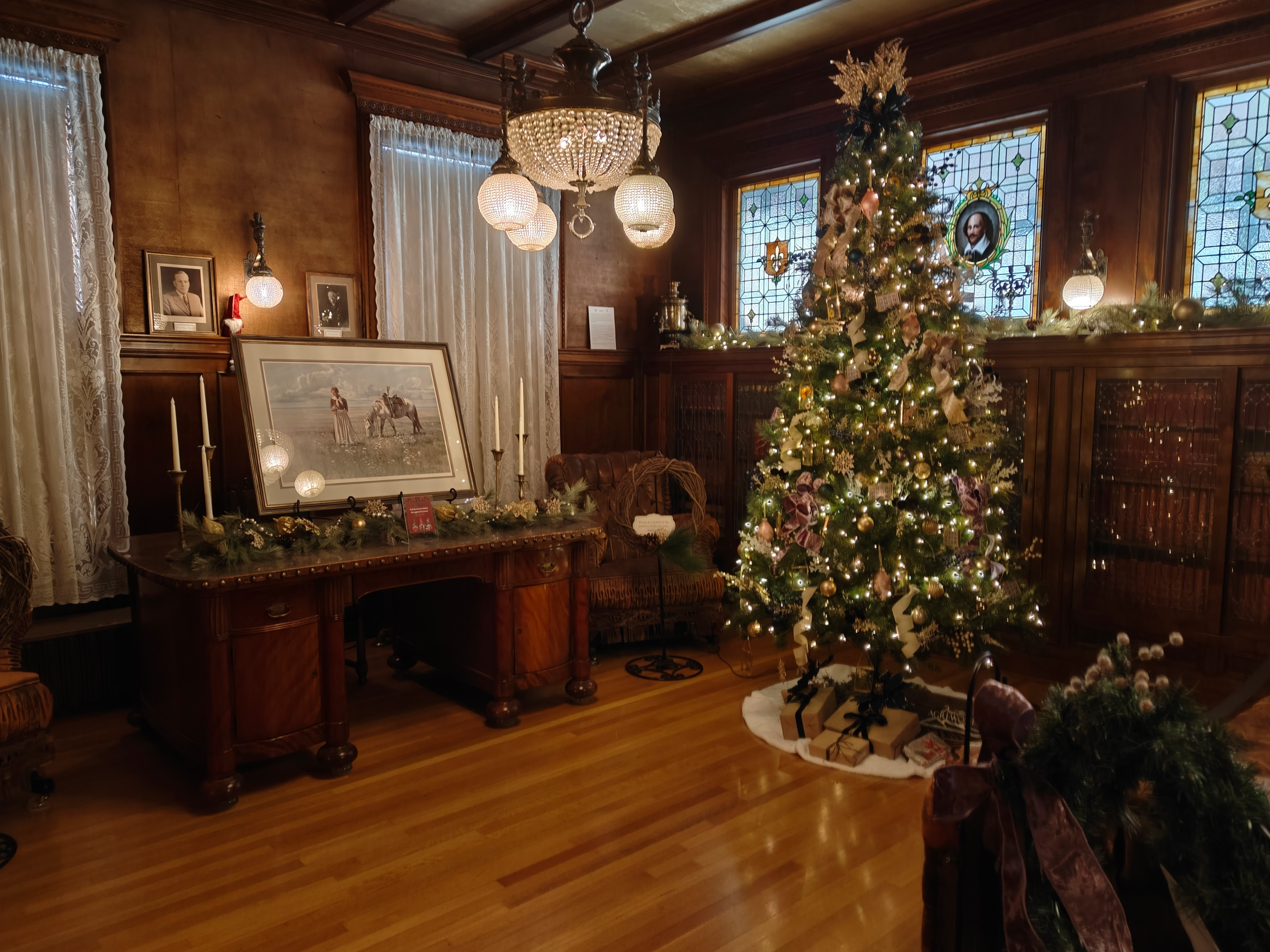
Library

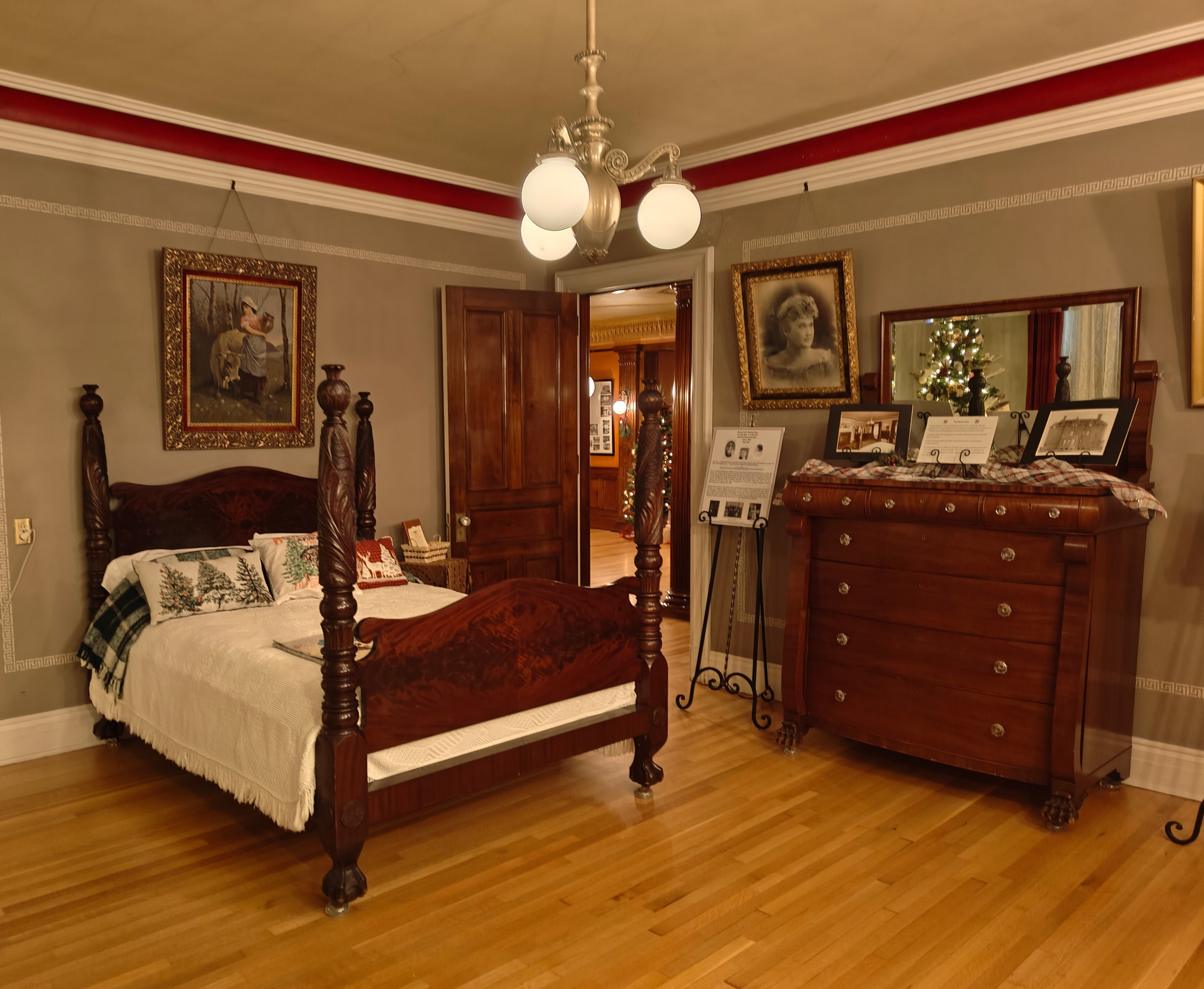
Master Suite
