= National American Indian Council =

The National American Indian Council was formed in March 1972 by about 300 delegates from 58 cities meeting in Omaha, Nebraska. It was spurred by urban, nonreservation Indians, and they resisted attempts by members of the more rural American Indian Movement to dominate the convention. Later in 1972, the Council offered for sale assorted greeting cards featuring reproductions of American Indian artifacts and art objects, with the proceeds benefiting Council projects. In 1975, the Council announced it had purchased the Willard Hotel building for its headquarters.

The National Congress of American Indians (NCAI), an American Indian and Alaska Native indigenous rights organization, invited the Council to join its coalition.
