= Jim Hewes =

American bartender

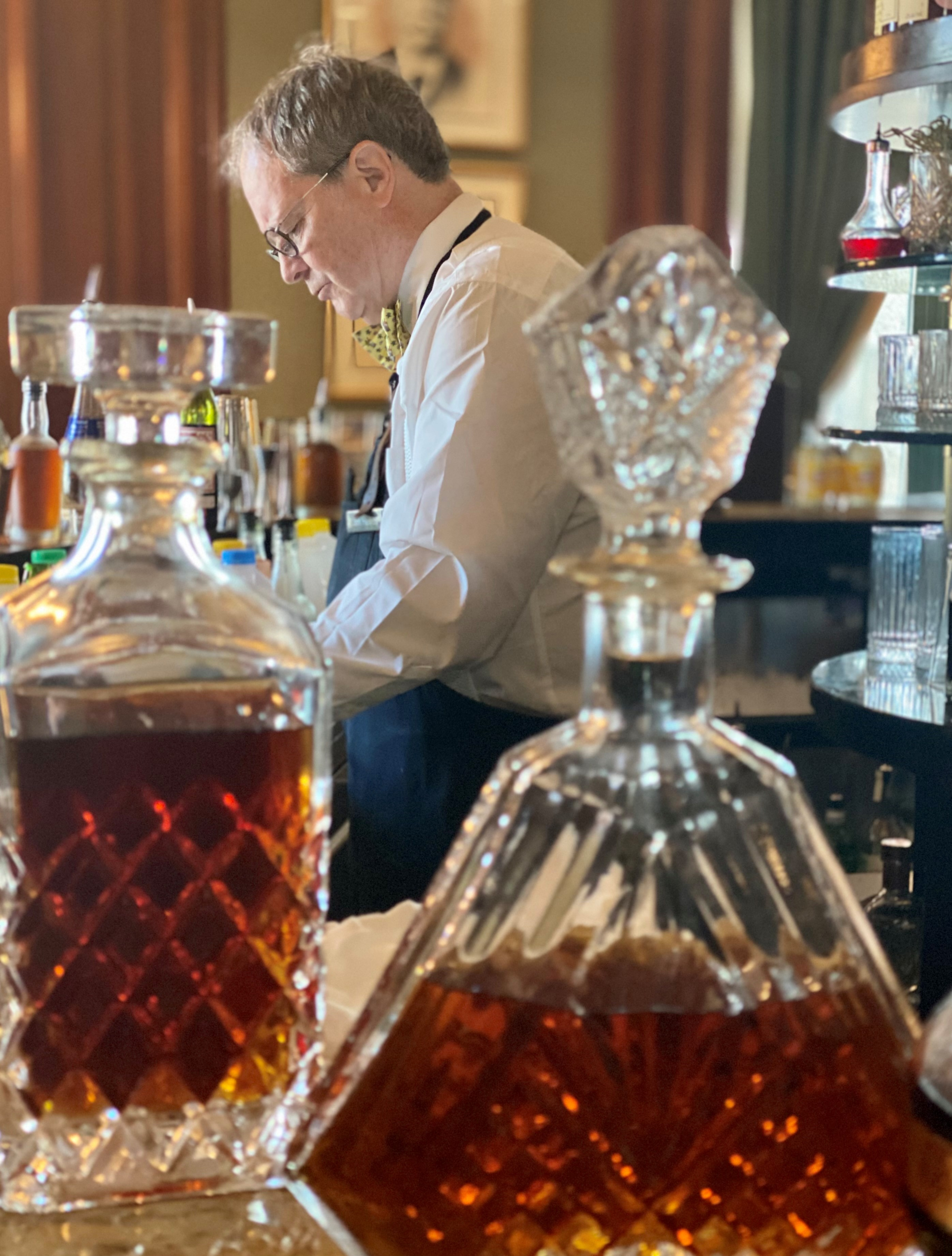
- Jim Hewes working at Round Robin Bar
- Citizenship: United States of America
- Occupation: Bartender
- Employer: Willard InterContinental Washington
- Known for: Longest serving bartender at the historic Round Robin Bar

Jim Hewes is an American bartender and cocktail historian who has worked at the Willard InterContinental Washington's Round Robin Bar for over 30 years, making him the longest serving bartender in Round Robin's over 180-year old history.

== Career ==
Never let the truth get in the way of a good story. - Jim Hewes

Hewes has a background in history and education. Prior to working at the Willard, where he started in 1986 upon the hotel's reopening, he worked at the Buxton Inn in Ohio.

Hewes has served drinks to numerous United States presidents, including Ronald Reagan, George Bush and George W. Bush, and Gerald Ford. He never served a sitting president, but only presidents before they entered or after they left office. Hewes' favorite president to serve was Ford, who he called "very down to earth and funny." He served Ford prior to entering the presidential office and prior to Ford becoming sober in support of his wife, Betty Ford. Gerald Ford used to drink Scotch or Budweiser.

Other famous people Hewes has poured drinks for include Pelé, George Clooney, Harry Connick, Jr. and Johnny Depp. In 1987, Hewes witnessed the dancer and choreographer Bob Fosse have a fatal heart attack outside of the Round Robin.

Hewes offers history programs at the Willard about craft cocktails, prohibition and other related subjects, specifically historical subjects pertaining to Washington. A collector of Washington and cocktail history ephemera, Hewes owns a Mint Julep recipe handwritten by Henry Clay.

=== Cocktails ===
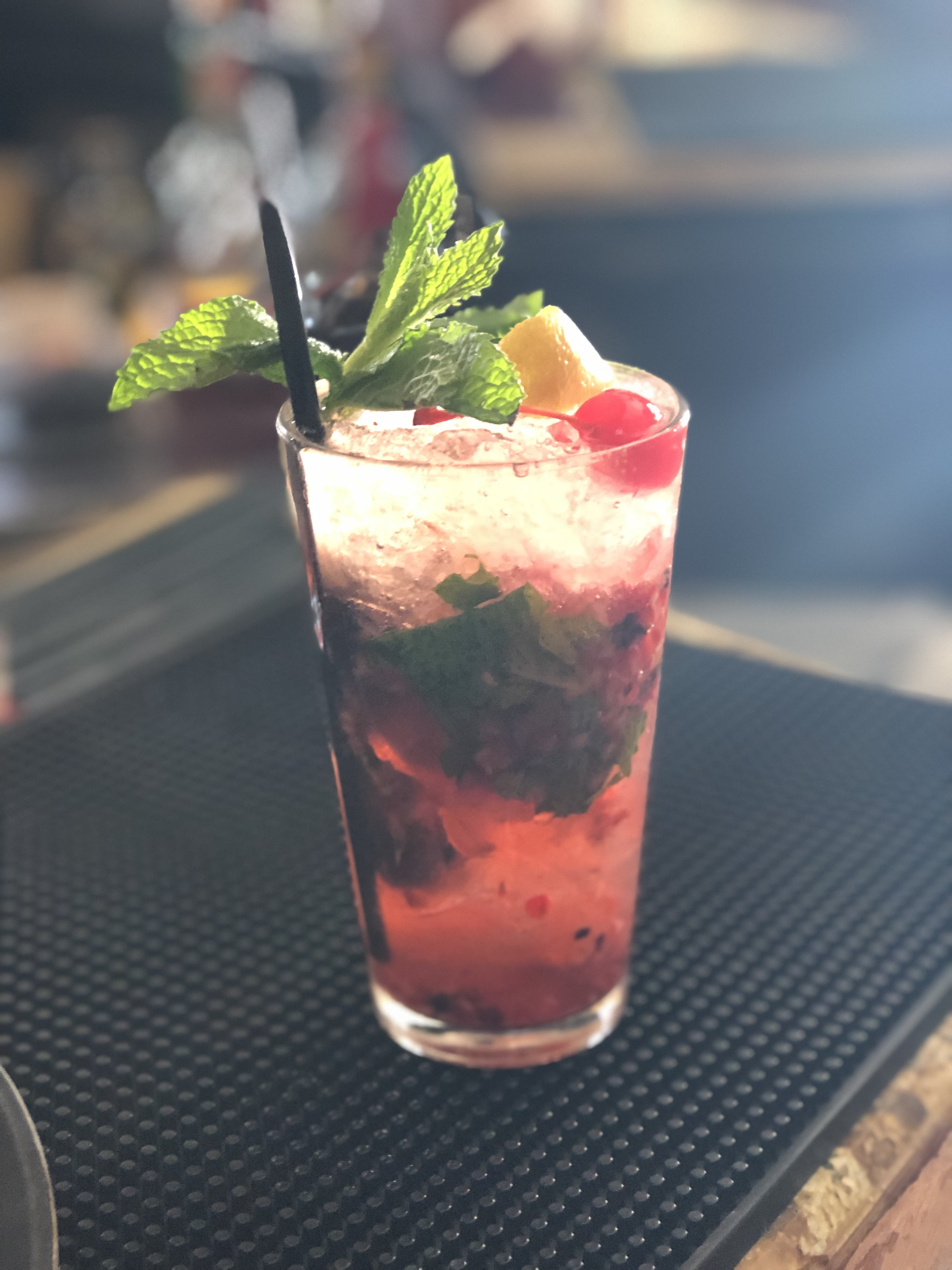
The "Jingle Bell Julep" is a holiday twist on the mint julep. An original recipe by Jim Hewes, it uses a berry-based maceration rather than traditional mint.

Hewes oversees the bar's cocktail program, which includes creating new thematic cocktails and reintroducing classic cocktails. He aims to create cocktails that guests can make easily at home. Hewes makes classic cocktails that reflect history and the cocktail's original recipe. He opposes the use of what he calls "secret ingredients" to craft cocktails. In a 2016 interview with Vice Hewes shared that "the key to a correct cocktail is the final taste."

His favorite drinks to make include the Old Fashioned, Sidecar, and Mint Julep, the latter which Henry Clay introduced to the bar. It remains the Round Robin's signature drink.

During the holidays, Hewes offers thematic cocktails, which have included hot spiced cider, hot buttered rum, and a Jingle Bell Julep, a variation on a mint julep with red and green spirits used to symbolize the holiday season. Other cocktails he has created for the holidays include the Poinsettia, which comprises Champagne, framboise and cranberry.

In 2013, Hewes created a cocktail program by creating a cocktail for all 44 presidents, based on cocktails that presidents have historically consumed or that are thematic to a president's life. Presidential beverages include Madeira wine, which George Washington used to drink, hot buttered rum in honor of John Quincy Adams, and a twist on the Blue Hawaii, which uses tequila rather than rum, as a tribute to Barack Obama, which honors Obama's life in Hawaii. He introduces the menu, for a limited time only, during every presidential inauguration season.

== Personal life ==
Hewes has lived in Washington DC since 1977. He is an avid book collector.
