= Frist Campus Center =

Student center at Princeton University

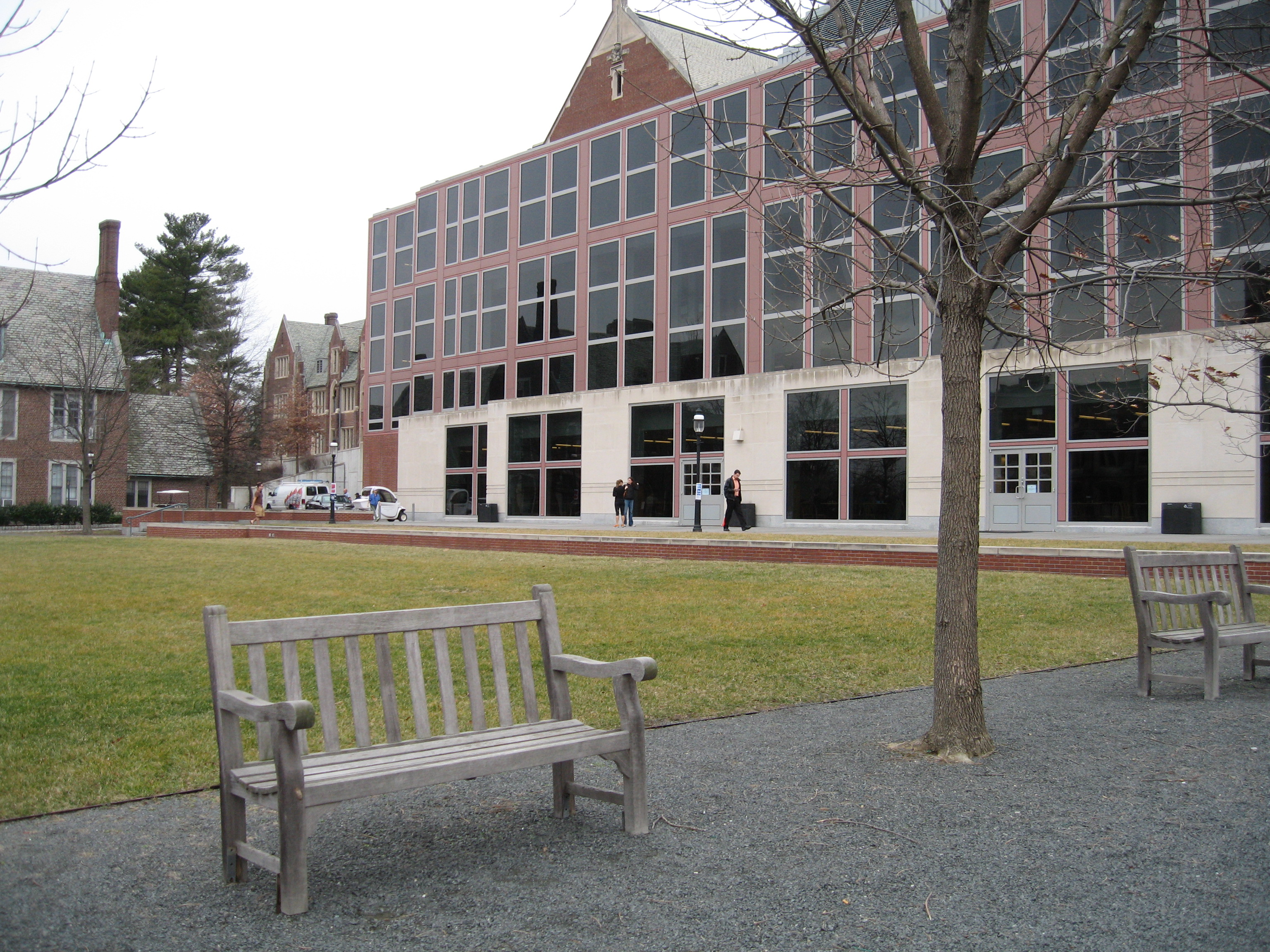
- Interactive map of the Frist Campus Center area
- Former names: Palmer Physical Laboratory

General information
- Opening: September, 2000
- Owner: Princeton University

Design and construction
- Architect: Robert Venturi
- Palmer Physical Laboratory
- U.S. Historic district – Contributing property
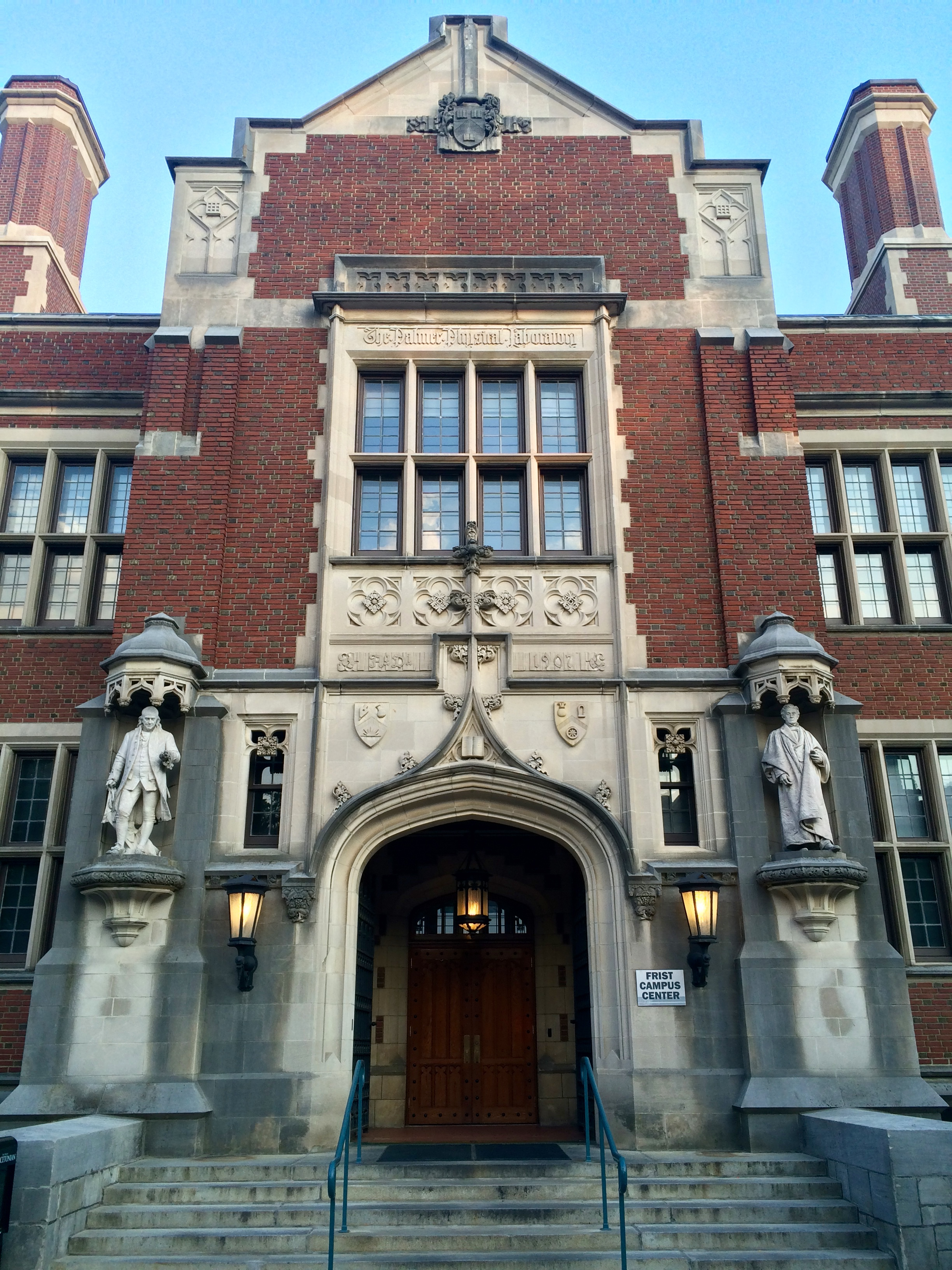

- Location within Mercer County, New Jersey
- Location: Frist Campus Center, Princeton, New Jersey
- Coordinates: 40°20′48.8″N 74°39′19.0″W
- Built: 1909
- Architect: Henry Janeway Hardenbergh
- Architectural style: Collegiate Gothic
- Part of: Princeton Historic District (ID75001143)
- Designated CP: 27 June 1975

Frist Campus Center is a focal point of social life at Princeton University. The campus center is a combination of the former Palmer Physics Lab, and a modern addition completed in 2001. It was endowed with money from the fortune the Frist family has made in the private hospital business.

Designed by Venturi, Scott Brown & Associates, the firm of acclaimed architects Robert Venturi (a Princeton alumnus) and Denise Scott Brown, the building consists of a modern expansion to the existing Collegiate Gothic Palmer Hall. The new building volume fills in the courtyard of the previous C-shaped structure, and extends across its open side to create a new east facade. In 2008 and 2009, extensive renovations were performed on the 100 level by James Bradberry Architects

Room 302 is a lecture hall restored to its condition at the time that Albert Einstein lectured there.

This building has also been used for external shots of the fictitious Princeton–Plainsboro Teaching Hospital in the television series House.
