= Hardenbergh/Rhinelander Historic District =

Historic district in New York City

Coordinates: 40°46′54″N 73°57′15″W

Six of the seven buildings of the district, along Lexington Avenue

The Hardenbergh/Rhinelander Historic District is a small historic district in the Carnegie Hill neighborhood of the Upper East Side of Manhattan, New York City. It was created by the New York City Landmarks Preservation Commission on May 5, 1998, and consists of six brick, brownstone and terra cotta Northern Renaissance Revival rowhouses along Lexington Avenue between East 89th and 90th Streets, and one apartment building, referred to as "French Flats" at the time, on East 89th Street. All the buildings were constructed in 1888–1889.

The name of the district derives from the architect, Henry J. Hardenbergh, and the owner and developer of the properties, the Estate of William C. Rhinelander. The Rhinelanders were a prominent family in the area.

== See also ==
- 146–156 East 89th Street
- 1342 Lexington Avenue
- List of New York City Designated Landmarks in Manhattan from 59th to 110th Streets
