= Henry Janeway Hardenbergh =

American architect (1847–1918)

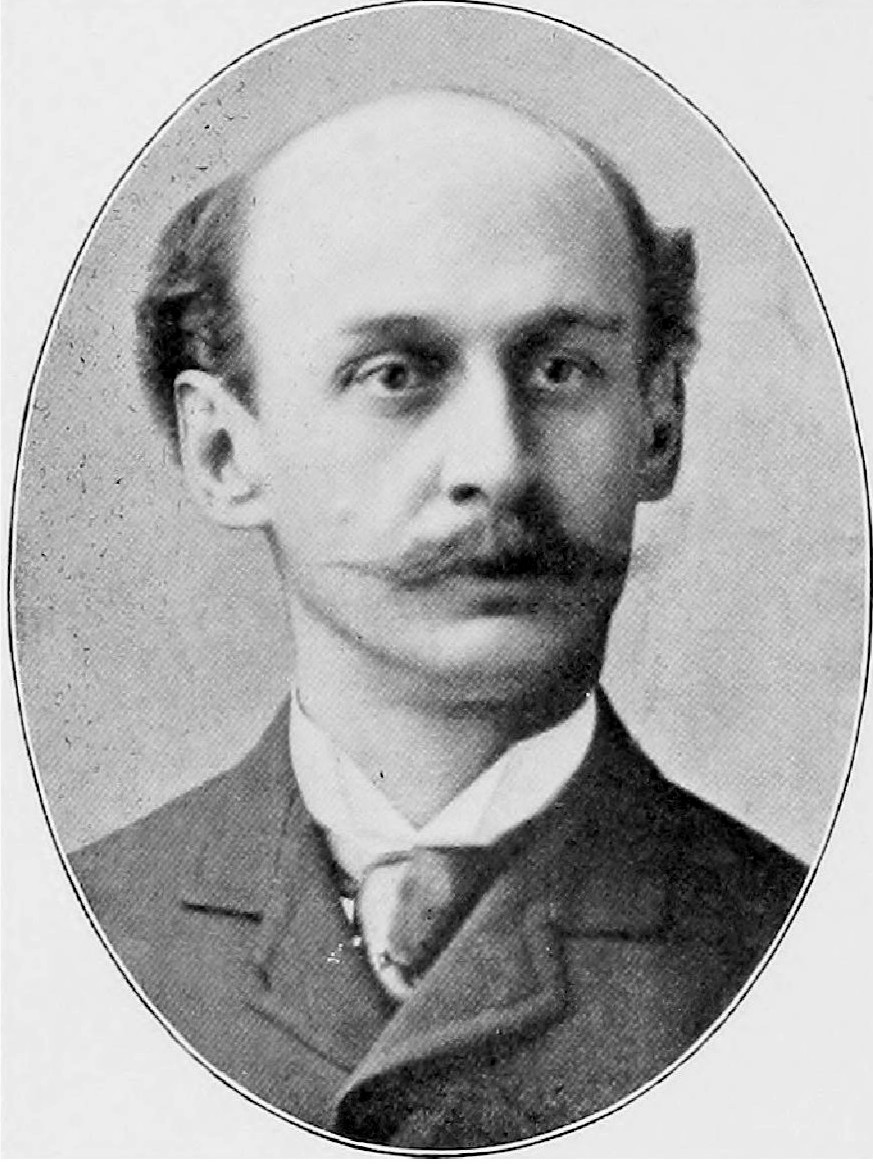
- Born: February 6, 1847; New Brunswick, New Jersey, U.S.
- Died: March 13, 1918 (aged 71); Manhattan, New York City, New York, U.S.
- Occupation: Architect

Signature
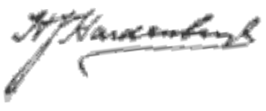

Henry Janeway Hardenbergh FAIA (February 6, 1847 – March 13, 1918) was an American architect, best known for his hotels and apartment buildings, and as a "master of a new building form — the skyscraper." He worked three times with Edward Clark, the wealthy owner of the Singer Sewing Machine Company and real estate developer: The Singer company's first tower in New York City, the Dakota Apartments, and its precursor, the Van Corlear. He is best known for building apartment dwellings and luxury hotels.

== Life and career ==
Hardenbergh was born in New Brunswick, New Jersey, of a Dutch family, and attended the Hasbrouck Institute in Jersey City. He apprenticed in New York from 1865 to 1870 under Detlef Lienau, and, in 1870, opened his own practice there.

He obtained his first contracts for three buildings at Rutgers College in New Brunswick, New Jersey—the expansion of Alexander Johnston Hall (1871), designing and building Geology Hall (1872) and the Kirkpatrick Chapel (1873)—through family connections. Hardenbergh's great-great grandfather, the Reverend Jacob Rutsen Hardenbergh, had been the first president of Rutgers College from 1785 to 1790, when it was still called "Queen's College".

He then got the contract to design the "Vancorlear" on West 55th Street, the first apartment hotel in New York City, in 1879. The following year, he was commissioned by Edward S. Clark, then head of the Singer Sewing Machine Company, to build a housing development. As part of this work, he designed the pioneering Dakota Apartments on Central Park West, novel in its location, very far north of the center of the city. He also designed some houses on West 73rd Street.

Subsequently, Hardenbergh received commissions to build the Waldorf Hotel (1893) and the adjoining Astoria Hotel (1897) hotels for William Waldorf Astor and Mrs. Astor, respectively. The two competing hotels were later joined together as the Waldorf-Astoria, which was demolished in 1929 for the construction of the Empire State Building.

Hardenbergh lived for some time in Bernardsville, New Jersey, where he designed the building for the school house built with funds donated by Frederic P. Olcott. The school house is in Hardenberghs architectural style and is a landmark in the town. Hardenbergh died at his home in Manhattan, New York City on March 13, 1918. He is buried in Woodland Cemetery, in Stamford, Connecticut.

== Organizations ==
Hardenbergh was elected to the American Institute of Architects in 1867, and was made a Fellow in 1877. He was president of the Architectural League of New York from 1901 to 1902, and was an associate of the National Academy of Design. Hardenbergh was one of the founders of the American Fine Arts Society as well as the Municipal Art Society. He was also a member of the Sculpture Society and the Century, Riding, Grolier and Church Clubs.

== Buildings ==
- 1870: Addition to the Rutgers Preparatory School building (now Alexander Johnston Hall) in New Brunswick, New Jersey.
- 1871–1872: library, chapel and Geology Hall, at Rutgers College (now university), in New Brunswick, New Jersey.
- 1873: Sophia Astley Kirkpatrick Memorial Chapel at Rutgers College, New Brunswick, New Jersey, with windows by Louis Comfort Tiffany (renovated 1916)
- 1873: Suydam Hall at New Brunswick Theological Seminary in New Brunswick, New Jersey (razed 1966)
- 1876: Kingfisher Tower near Cooperstown, New York
- 1879: The Vancolear, West 55th Street and Seventh Avenue, the city's first apartment hotel
- 1879: Loch Ada, 590 Proctor Road, Glen Spey, Lumberland, Sullivan County, New York (razed 1996)
- 1879–1880: two row houses at 101 and 103 West 73rd Street in Manhattan, New York City
- 1880–1884: The Dakota Apartments located on Manhattan's Upper West Side, in New York City (NYC landmark)
- 1882–1884: Western Union Telegraph Building, located at 186 Fifth Avenue at 23rd Street in Manhattan, New York City
- 1882–1885: Several Row houses at 13-67 West 73rd Street on Manhattan's Upper West Side, New York City
- 1883: Hotel Albert (now the Albert Apartments) in Manhattan, New York City
- 1883-84: 1845 Broadway in Manhattan, New York City
- 1886–1887: 337 & 339 East 87th Street, Manhattan, New York City
- 1888: Schermerhorn Building at 376-380 Lafayette Street in Manhattan, New York City
- 1888–1889: Apartment building at 121 East 89th Street part of the Hardenbergh/Rhinelander Historic District
- 1888–1889: Row houses at 1340, 1342, 1344, 1346, 1348 and 1350 Lexington Avenue part of the Hardenbergh/Rhinelander Historic District
- 1891–1892: American Fine Arts Society building, home of the Art Students League of New York, in Manhattan, New York City (NYC landmark)
- 1893: Waldorf Hotel located at 34th Street and Fifth Avenue in Midtown Manhattan, New York City (demolished 1929 to build Empire State Building)
- 1893: Hotel Manhattan located on the northwest corner of Madison Avenue and 42nd Street in New York City, New York.
- 1895: Wolfe Building, at William Street and Maiden Lane, New York City (demolished in 1974)
- 1897: Astoria Hotel located at 34th Street and Fifth Avenue in Midtown Manhattan, New York City (demolished 1929 to build Empire State Building)
- 1897: William Murray Houses, located at 13 and 15 West 54th Street, Manhattan, New York City (NYC landmark)
- 1897–1900: Hotel Martinique on Broadway in Manhattan, New York City (enlarged 1907-11) a NYC landmark
- 1900–1901: Textile Building on Leonard Street and Church Street in Manhattan, New York City (penthouse added in 2001) a NYC landmark
- 1901: Willard Hotel in Washington, D.C.
- 1902: Sunnyside Island, in the 1000 Islands, New York
- 1902–1904: Whitehall Building in Manhattan, New York City (NYC landmark)
- 1903: Preston B. Moss House, 914 Division St., Billings, Montana
- 1904: All Angels' Church – Manhattan, New York City
- 1904: Van Norden Trust Company Building, 751 5th Ave., New York City, demolished.
- 1905–1907: Plaza Hotel at corner of Fifth Avenue and Central Park South (West 59th Street) in Midtown Manhattan, New York City a NYC landmark
- 1906: North Annex of the Windsor Hotel in Montreal
- 1906: St. John's Episcopal Church in Palmerton, Pennsylvania, known as "The Beautiful Stone Church at the Top of the Park."
- 1908: Trinity Episcopal Church in York Harbor, Maine
- 1910: Palmer Physical Laboratory, at Princeton University
- 1911: The Raleigh Hotel at 1111 Pennsylvania Avenue, in Washington D.C. (demolished 1965)
- 1912: Copley Plaza Hotel in Boston, Massachusetts
- 1912: Stamford Trust Company Building, 300 Main St., Stamford, Connecticut
- 1914: Palmer Stadium, the football stadium and track arena at Princeton University, in Princeton, New Jersey (demolished 1998)
- 1915: Consolidated Edison Company Building in Manhattan, New York City (the building only, not the tower)
- 1917–1918: New Jersey Zinc Company Headquarters, Maiden Lane, Manhattan, New York City.

== Gallery ==
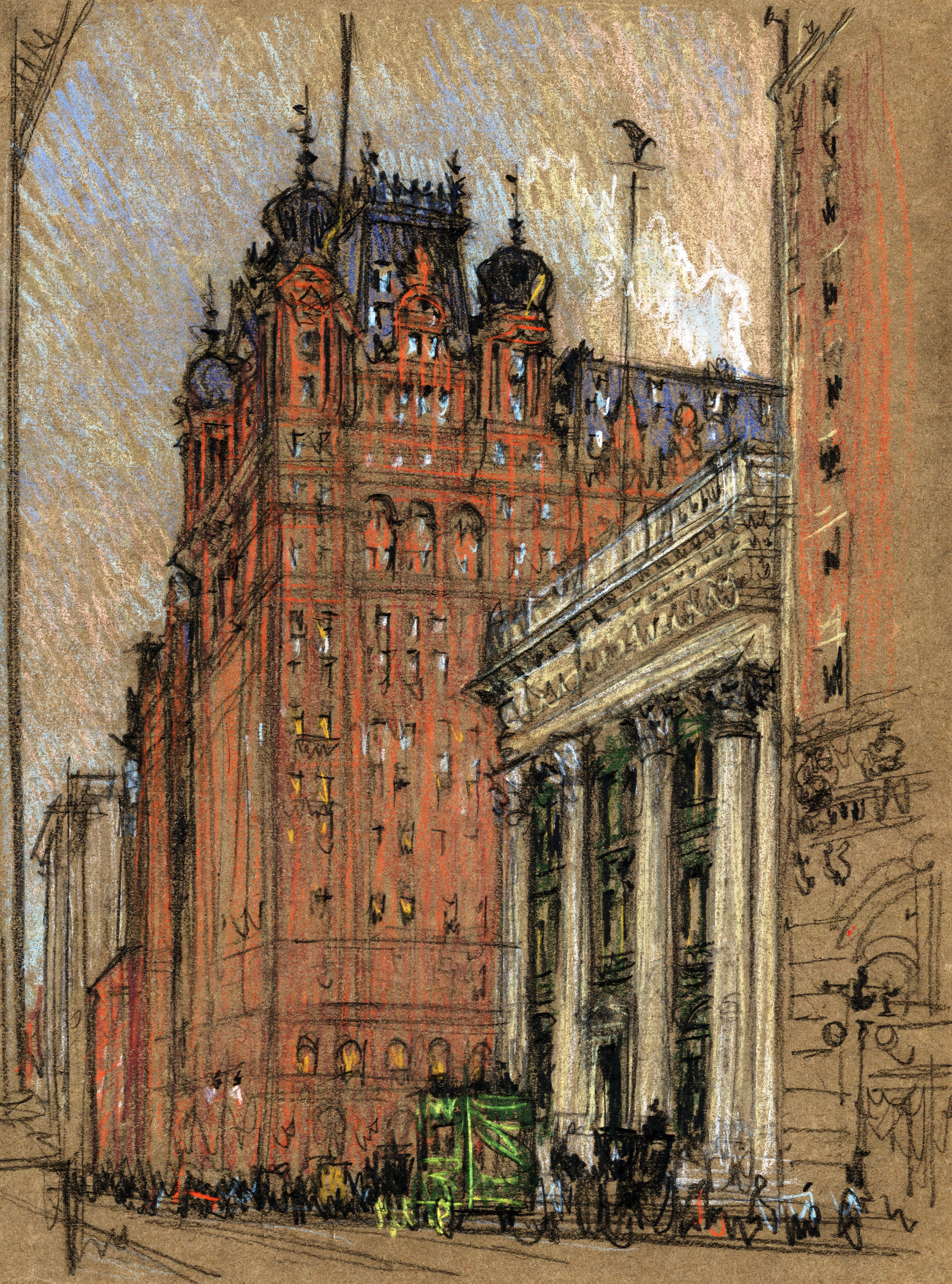
The Waldorf-Astoria at its original location, Fifth Avenue and 34th Street. Drawing by Joseph Pennell, c. 1904-08.

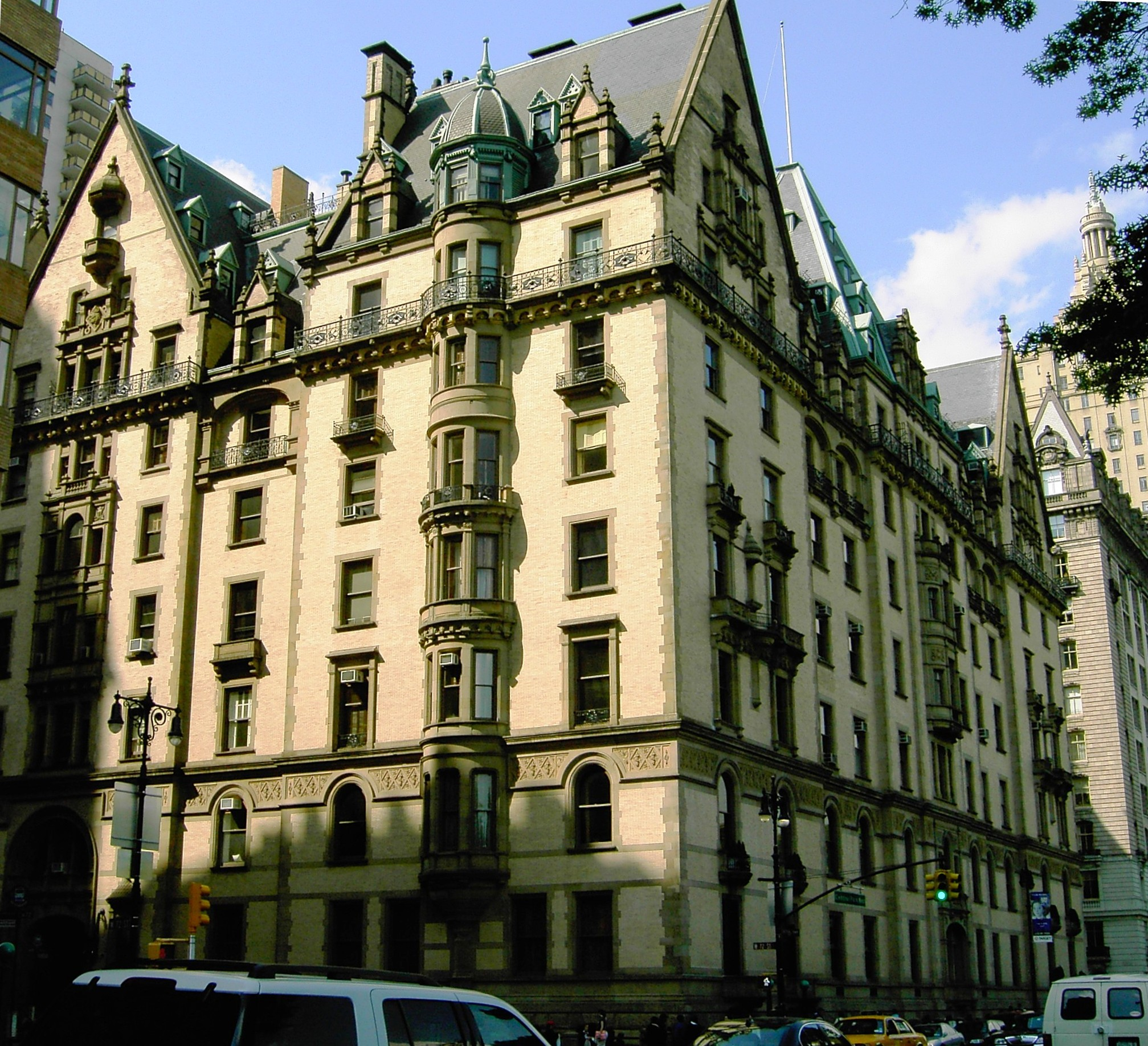
The Dakota Building, so far uptown when it was built that it was said it might as well be in the Dakota Territory

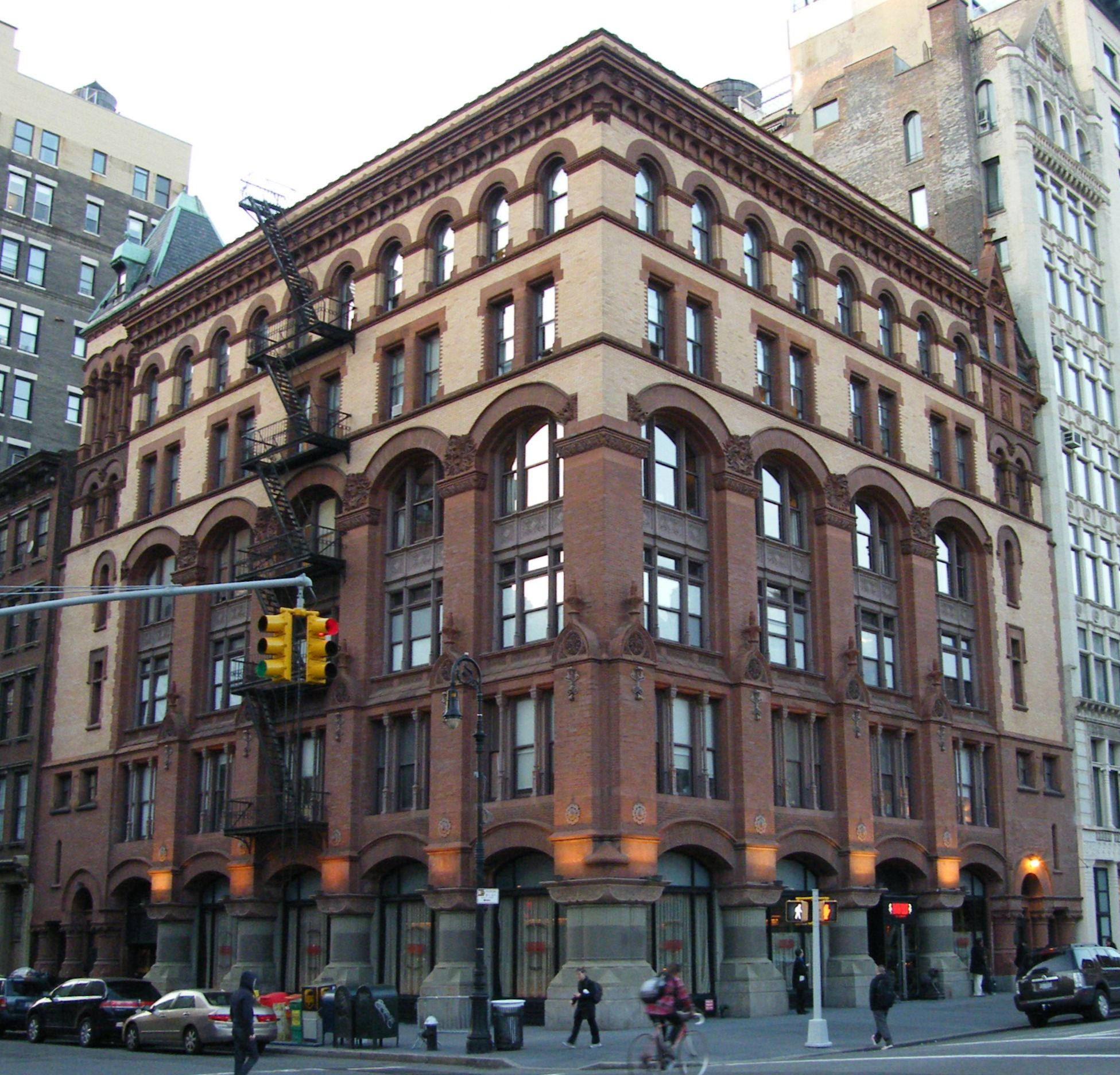
Schermerhorn Building (1888)

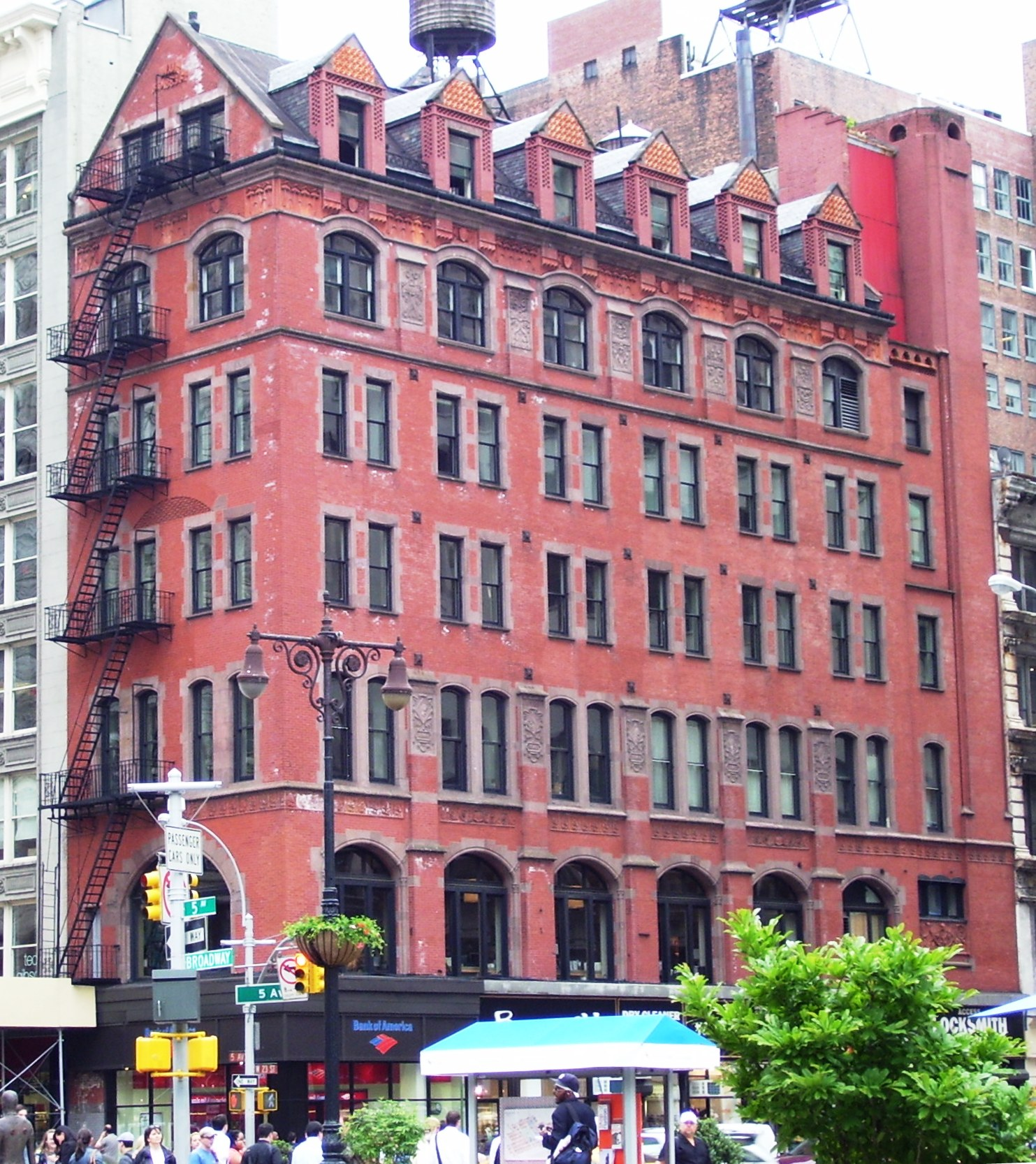
Western Union Telegraph Building (partial rebuild 1884)

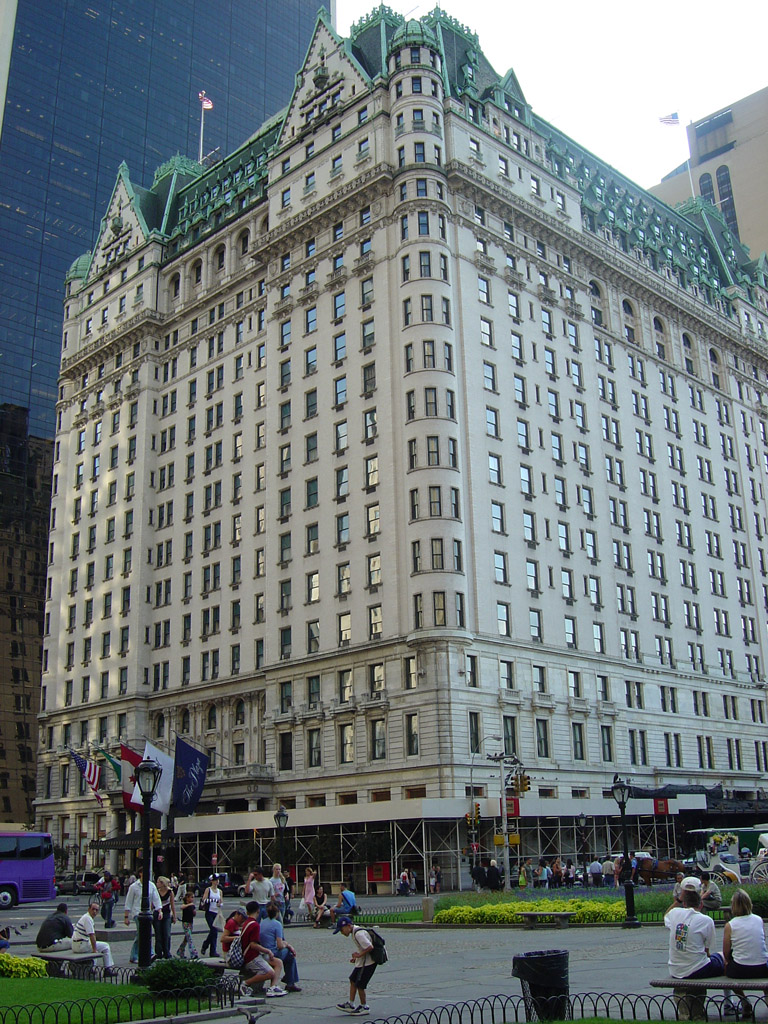
The Plaza Hotel (1907)

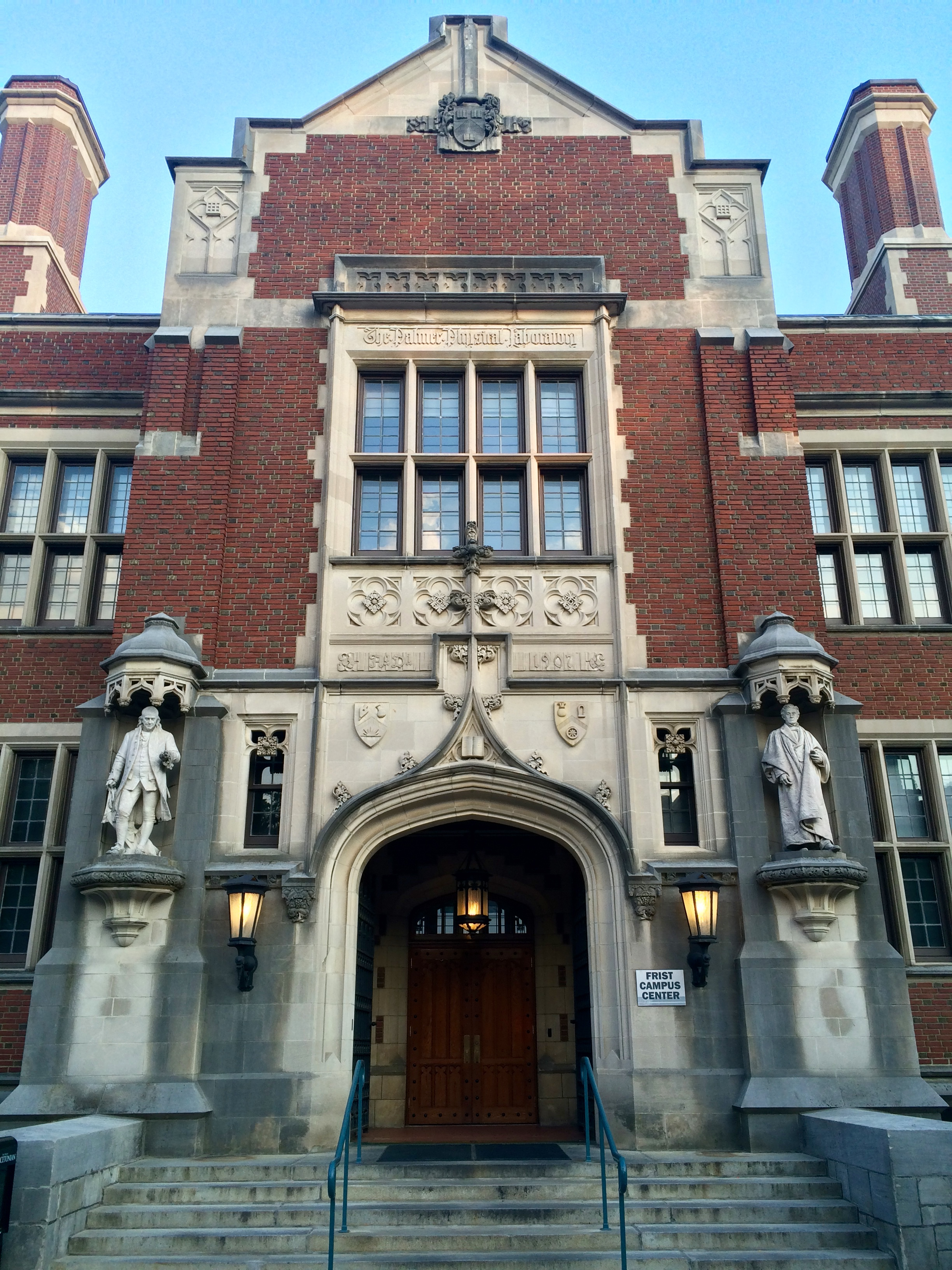
Palmer Physical Laboratory (1910) at Princeton University
