= 1342 Lexington Avenue =

Building in Manhattan, New York

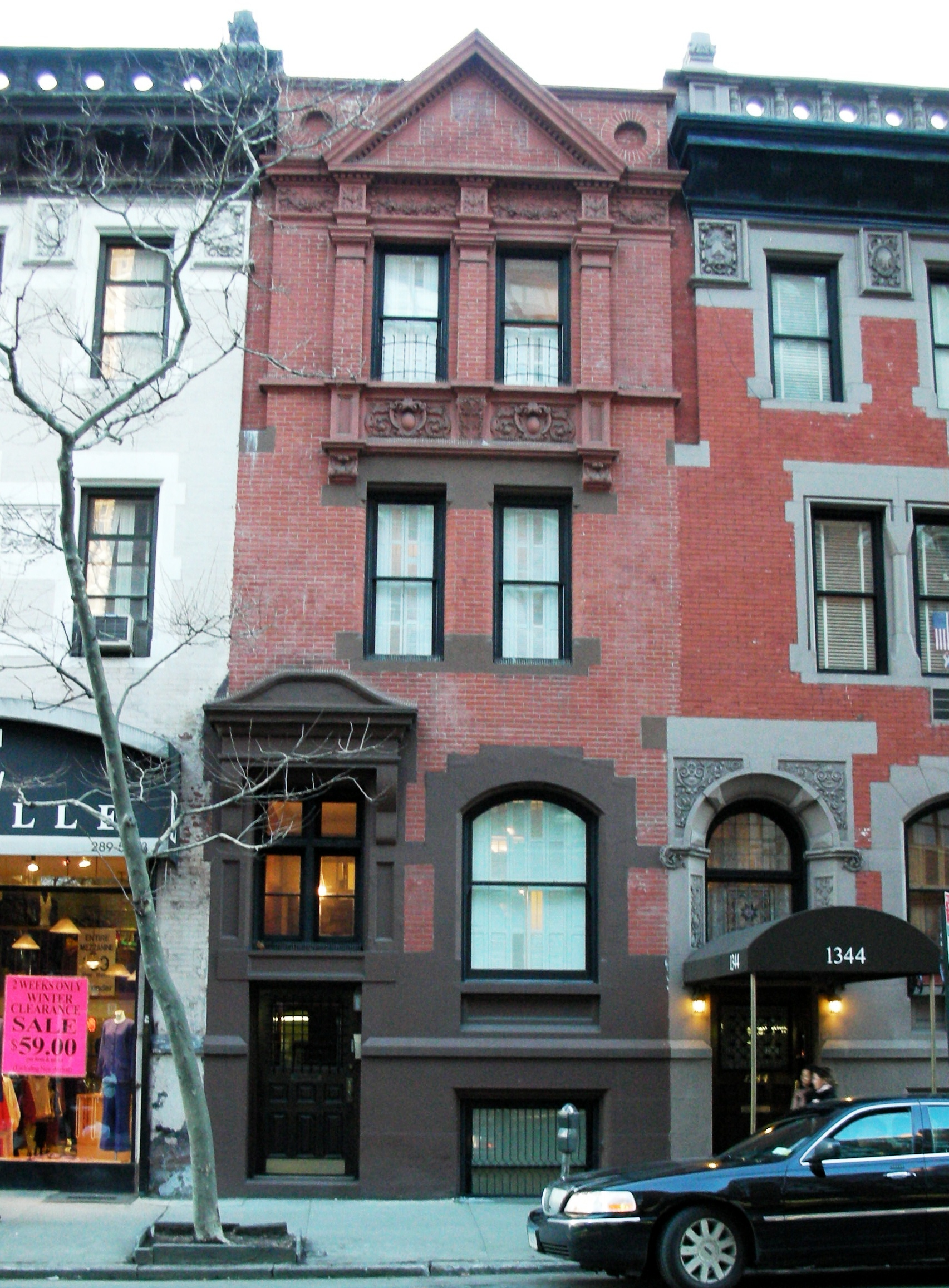
- Interactive map of the 1342 Lexington Avenue area

General information
- Type: Rowhouse
- Location: 1342 Lexington Avenue, Manhattan, New York City
- Coordinates: 40°46′54″N 73°57′15″W
- Year built: 1889

Technical details
- Size: 3072 Sq Ft

Design and construction
- Architect: Henry J. Hardenbergh

1342 Lexington Avenue is a townhouse located on the Upper East Side of Manhattan in New York City. Best known as the residence of American Pop artist Andy Warhol from 1960 to 1974, the property played a pivotal role in the early development of Warhol's career and the creation of some of his most iconic works in the early 1960s. The townhouse was designated a historical landmark as part of the Hardenbergh/Rhinelander Historic District in 1998.

== Early history and architecture ==
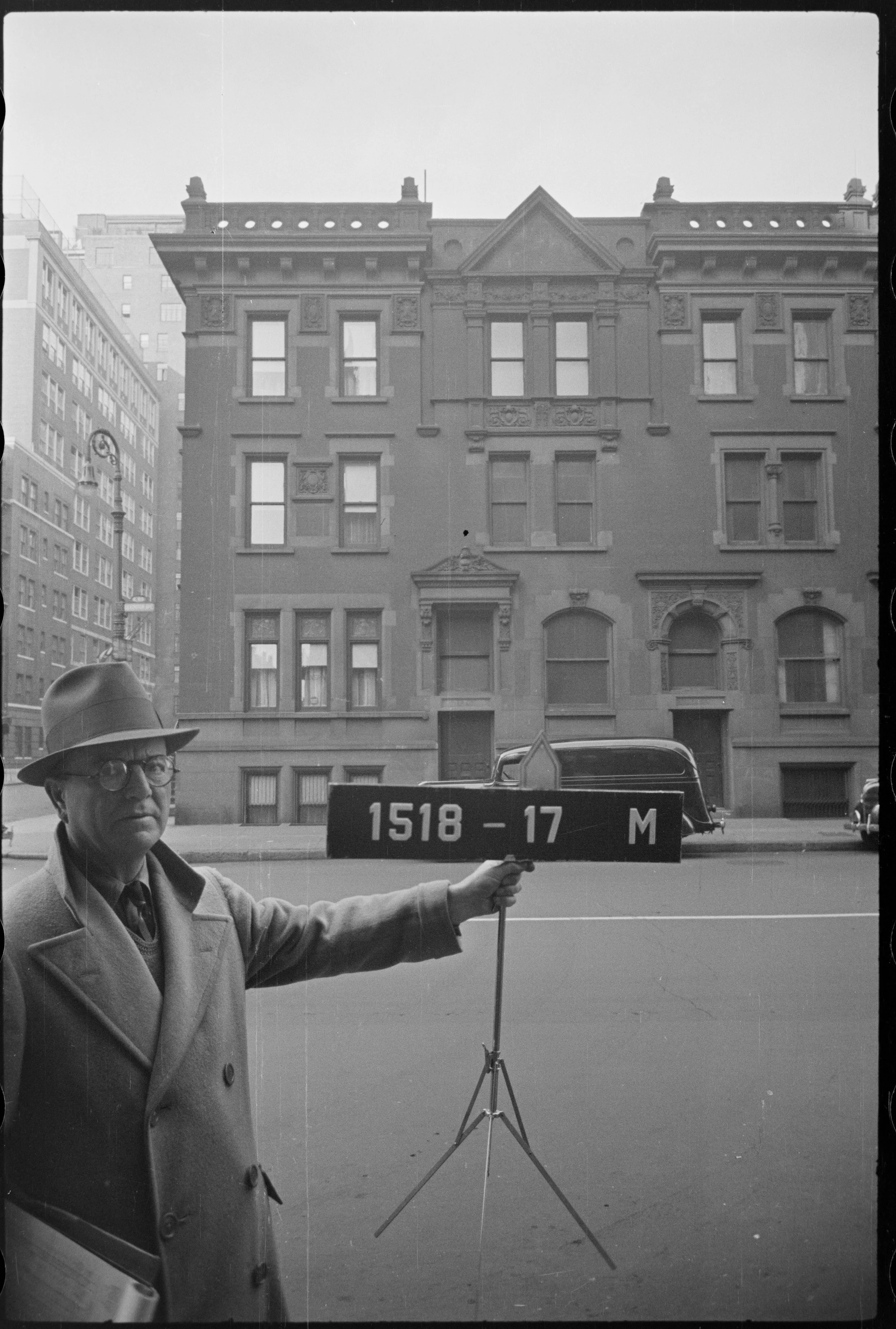
1342 Lexington Avenue in a 1940 tax photo

The three-story structure is part of a cohesive row of townhouses on Lexington Avenue and a small apartment building on East 89th Street, erected between 1888 and 1889 on previously undeveloped lots for the Estate of William C. Rhinelander. Designed in the Northern Renaissance Revival style by Henry J. Hardenbergh, the ensemble reflects the late 19th-century development of the Carnegie Hill section of Manhattan. The building is clad in red brick, terra cotta, and brownstone, with terra-cotta panels and alternating pierced and pedimented parapets above the ground floor.

The townhouse was leased to various tenants, including Dr. Edmund J. Palmer, who was appointed a Commissioner of Quarantine in 1895. The Rhinelander family retained ownership of the property until 1948, when it was sold to private owners.

== Andy Warhol residence ==
In August 1960, Andy Warhol—then a successful commercial illustrator known for his advertising and magazine work—purchased 1342 Lexington Avenue for $60,000. Seeking a larger workspace to accommodate his expanding artistic practice and growing personal collections, Warhol relocated from 242 Lexington Avenue in the Murray Hill neighborhood, where he had lived with his mother since 1953.

Warhol's mother, Julia Warhola, moved with him to the new townhouse. She occupied a ground-floor apartment, while Warhol used the upper floors as both his residence and studio. The expanded space allowed him to store artwork, props, and collected objects, and it was during this period that he transitioned from commercial illustration to fine art. Until he rented his first dedicated studio, an unoccupied former firehouse at 159 East 87th Street, Warhol worked primarily out of the rear parlor on the ground floor at his Lexington Avenue townhouse. Among the major works produced during these years were the Campbell's Soup Cans, Dollar Bills, and Coca-Cola series, paintings that helped define the emerging Pop Art movement and establish Warhol's reputation in the early 1960s New York art world.

1966, Warhol filmed The George Hamilton Story, also known as Mrs. Warhol, at his Lexington Avenue townhouse. The film featured his mother portraying "an aging peroxide movie star with a lot of husbands." Her most recent spouse in the film was played by Warhol's then live-in boyfriend, Richard Rheem. The production reflects the townhouse's role not only as Warhol's residence and painting studio but also as an occasional site for his experimental filmmaking.

By the end of the 1960s, the townhouse had become densely filled with Warhol's collections. Warhol superstar Ultra Violet recalled visiting his mother while he was hospitalized in 1968:

My eyes can find nowhere to rest amid the carousel horses, boxes of all kinds, a giant wooden Coke bottle, a carnival punching bag machine, a John Chamberlain sculpture, Victorian furniture mixed with dozens of shopping bags, Tiffany lamps, stuffed peacocks, rugs piled as in a cluttered shop—Indian, American Indian, Oriental, rugs of all sizes—silver everywhere, china, porcelain, paneling, all of Ali Baba's treasure. What a collectomaniac! We've shopped together in antique stores, but I never knew he bought everything in sight.

After Warhol was discharged from the hospital, his boyfriend, Jed Johnson, moved into the house to help care for him and his ailing mother. "His mother spent a lot of time in bed. She was really senile. I used to have to take her to the doctor once a week. Then I used to stay and I'd help him get dinner and do some shopping. Andy was a pack rat—he'd saved everything, every bit of junk mail, every empty box and tin can. I sorted things out, put paintings with paintings and cans with cans. I ended up being there all the time so I just stayed," Johnson said. In 1971, Warhol's mother was sent to live with his brother, Paul Warhola, in Pittsburgh. By 1974, Warhol and Johnson outgrew the space and relocated to a larger townhouse at 57 East 66th Street, which Johnson found and helped to renovate.

== Frederick W. Hughes ownership ==
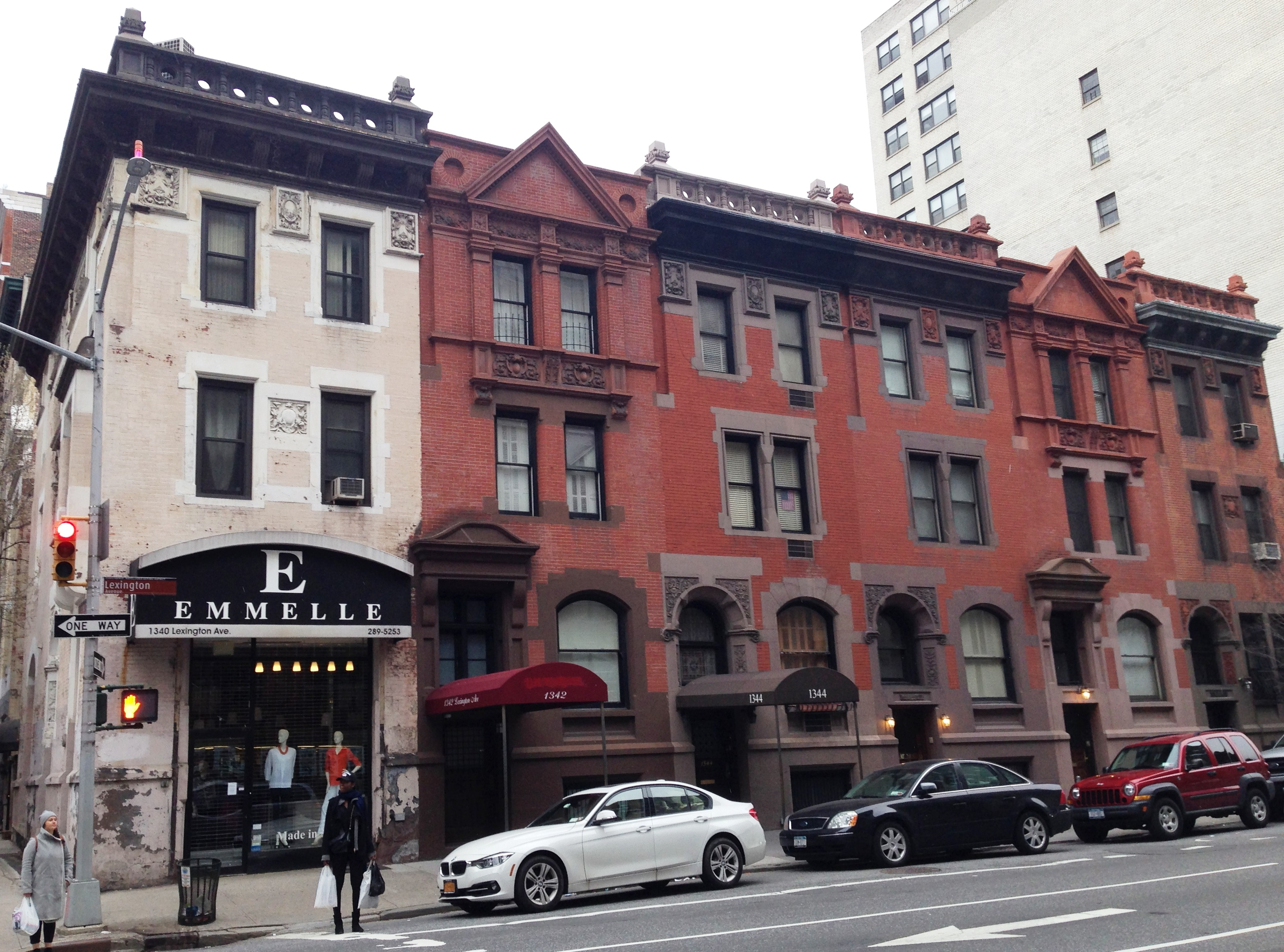
Six of the seven buildings of the Hardenbergh/Rhinelander Historic District, on Lexington Avenue, in 2016

Warhol retained ownership of 1342 Lexington Avenue after his departure and leased it to his business manager, Fred Hughes, in 1974. In 1989, Hughes, who served as executor of Warhol's estate following the artist's death in 1987, purchased the property for $593,500 from the estate.

Hughes reportedly nicknamed the house "Hotel Anglomania" in reference to his extensive and compulsive collection of portraits of English royalty displayed inside. He kept a large Warhol portrait of Prince Charles in the foyer.

On May 5, 1998, the townhouse, together with five adjacent rowhouses and a separate "French Flat" building designed by Henry J. Hardenbergh, was designated by the New York City Landmarks Preservation Commission as part of the Hardenbergh/Rhinelander Historic District.

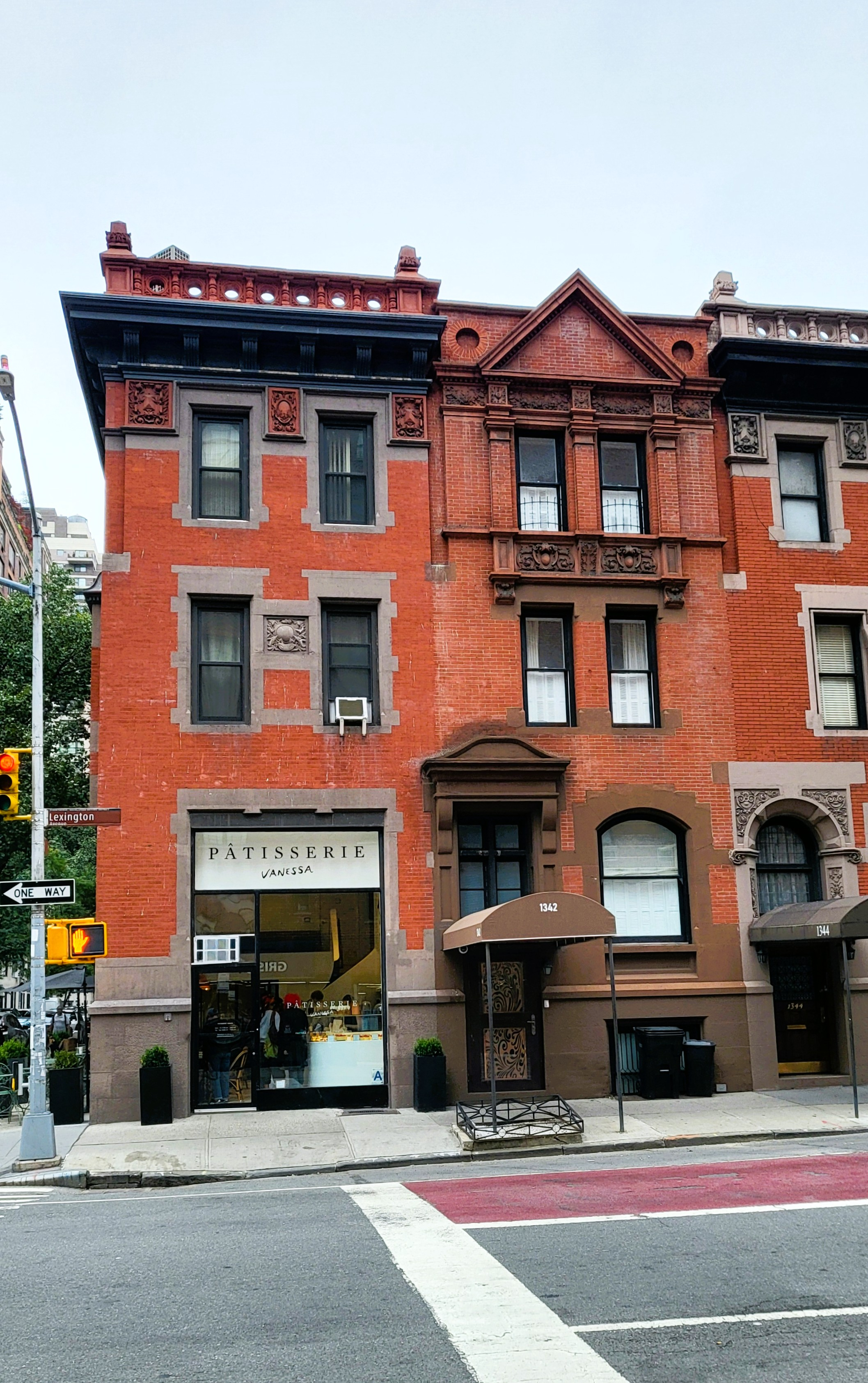
1342 Lexington in 2025

Hughes lived at the property until he died in 2001.

== Later owners ==
Following Hughes's death, the townhouse was sold to Dennis Omar and Nancy Smith, founders of the global marketing research firm Analytic Partners, for $2.55 million. They modernized the building's mechanical systems while largely preserving its original layout and character. Renovations included removing marbleized blue paint from a wood fireplace in the front parlor and replacing glossy dark blue walls adorned with gold petal motifs with more neutral tones. They also displayed several authenticated Warhol prints throughout the home, maintaining a visible connection to the artist's legacy.

The property was sold in 2011 for $3.5 million and again in 2013 for $5.5 million. A sign identifying the townhouse as "The Warhol," a local landmark of sorts, was removed by the owners in 2015.

The property briefly returned to the market as a rental in December 2024, listed at $22,550 per month. In 2025, the townhouse was placed on the market again, with an asking price of $6.95 million.

== In pop culture ==
Warhol's nephew, James Warhola, wrote and illustrated a children's book, Uncle Andy's, published by Puffin Books in 2003, about a family visit to 1342 Lexington Avenue in the early 1960s.

== Sources ==
- Gopnik, Blake (2020). Warhol. New York: Ecco. ISBN 9780062298393.
