= Willard InterContinental Washington =

Historic hotel in Washington, D.C.

Willard Hotel

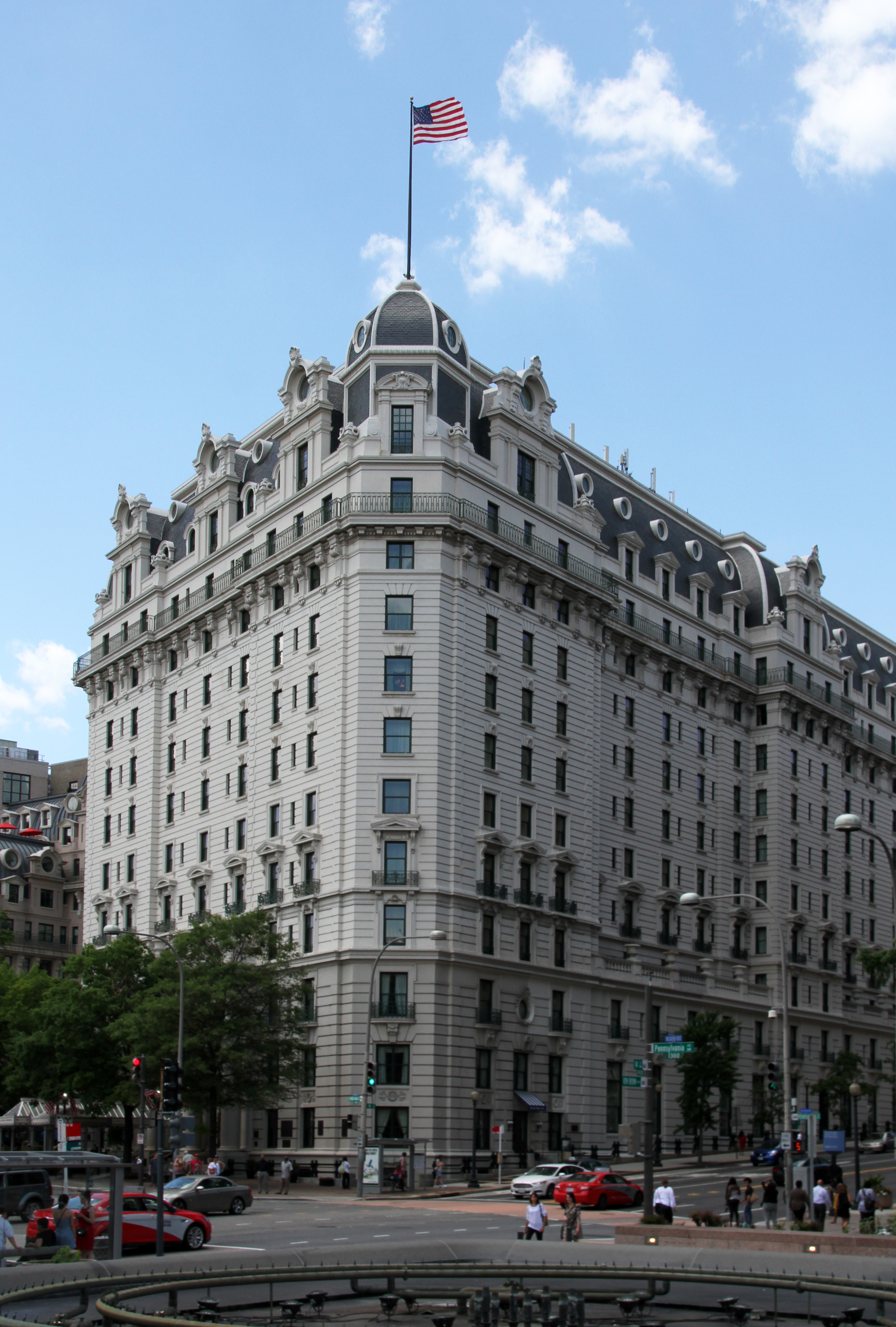
- Willard Hotel in 2016

- Location within Central Washington, D.C. Location within the District of Columbia Location within the United States

General information
- Type: Hotel
- Architectural style: Beaux-Arts
- Location: 1401–1409 Pennsylvania Avenue NW, Washington, D.C., United States
- Coordinates: 38°53′48″N 77°01′56″W
- Completed: Original six structures: 1816; 210 years ago Unified structure: 1847; 179 years ago Current structure: 1901; 125 years ago

Design and construction
- Architects: Henry Janeway Hardenbergh (hotel); Hardy Holzman Pfeiffer Associates and Vlastimil Koubek, annex

Website
- washington.intercontinental.com

U.S. National Register of Historic Places
- Designated: February 15, 1974
- Reference no.: 74002177

D.C. Inventory of Historic Sites
- Designated: November 8, 1964
- Reference no.: 55

The Willard InterContinental Washington, commonly known as the Willard Hotel, is a historic luxury Beaux-Arts hotel located at 1401 Pennsylvania Avenue NW in Downtown Washington, D.C. It is a member of Historic Hotels of America. Among its facilities are numerous luxury guest rooms, several restaurants, the Round Robin Bar, the Peacock Alley series of high-end shops, and large function rooms. Owned jointly by Carr Companies and InterContinental Hotels & Resorts, it is two blocks east of the White House, and two blocks west of the Metro Center station of the Washington Metro.

== History ==
=== Site ===
The first structures to be built at 1401 Pennsylvania Avenue NW were six small houses constructed by Colonel John Tayloe III, of The Octagon House, DC, and Mount Airy, Virginia, in 1816. Tayloe leased the six buildings to Joshua Tennison, who named them Tennison's Hotel. The structures served as a hotel for the next three decades, the leaseholder and name changing several times: Williamson's Mansion Hotel, Fullers American House, and the City Hotel. By 1847, the structures were in disrepair and Tayloe's son, Benjamin Ogle Tayloe (of the Benjamin Ogle Tayloe House), was desperate to find a tenant who would maintain the structures and run them profitably.

=== Willard's Hotel ===
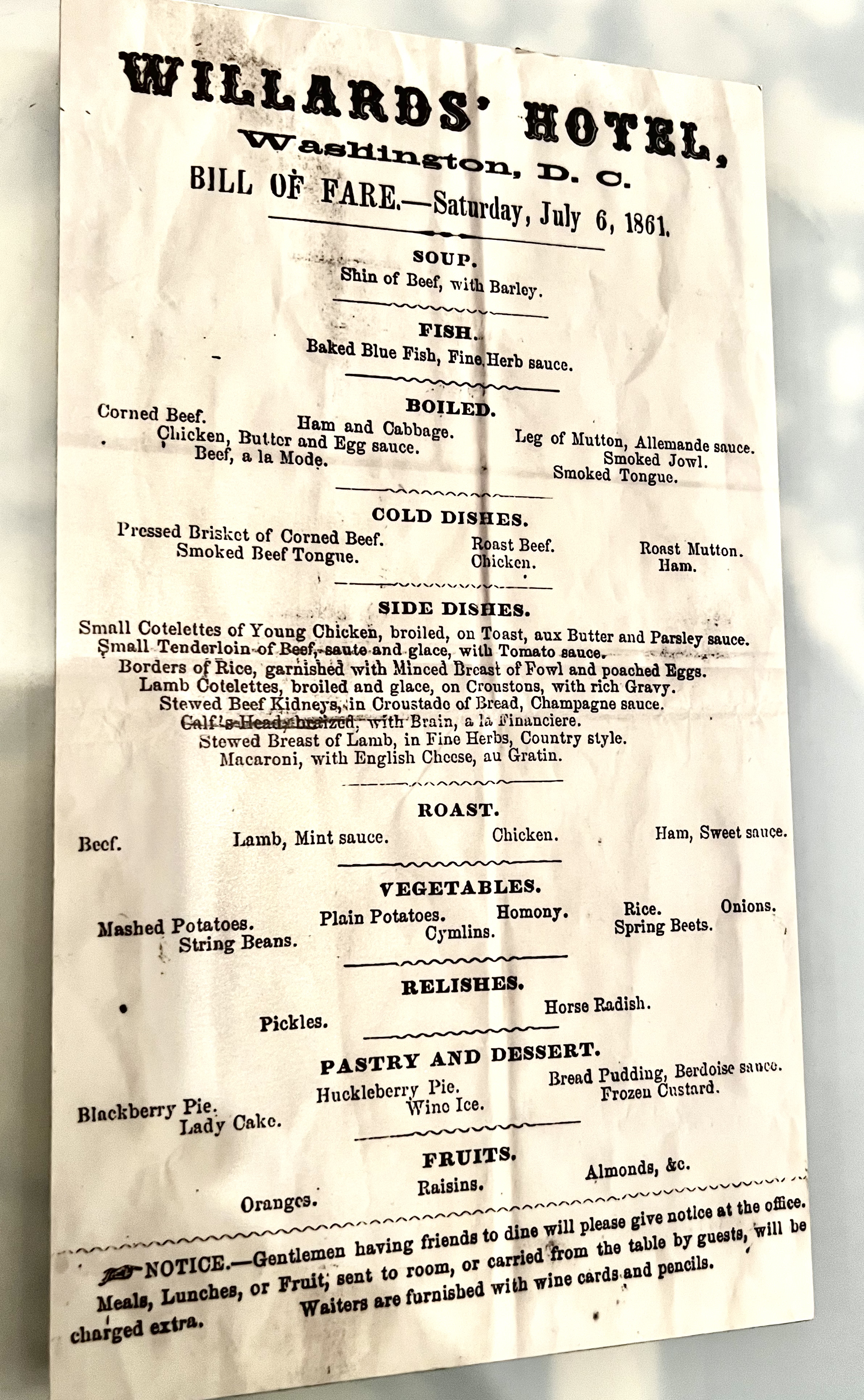
Menu at Willard Hotel, July 6, 1861

The current hotel was founded by Henry Willard, a former chief steward on the steamer "Niagara" on the Hudson River, personally suggested by “Ogle” Tayloe's second wife, Miss Phoebe Warren, formerly of Troy, New York, in 1847; when he leased the six buildings, combined them into a single structure, and enlarged it into a four-story hotel he renamed Willard's Hotel. Willard purchased the hotel property from Ogle Tayloe in 1864, but a dispute over the purchase price and the form of payment (paper currency or gold coin) led to a major equity lawsuit that ended up in the Supreme Court of the United States. The Supreme Court split the difference in Willard v. Tayloe. 75 U.S. 557 (1869): The purchase price would remain the same, but Willard must pay in gold coin (which had not depreciated in value the way paper currency had).

=== Modern Willard Hotel building ===
The present 12-story structure, designed in the Beaux-Arts style by famed hotel architect Henry Janeway Hardenbergh, opened in 1901. It suffered a major fire in 1922 which caused $250,000 (equivalent to $4,808,648 as of 2025), in damages. Among those who had to be evacuated from the hotel were Vice President Calvin Coolidge, several U.S. senators, composer John Philip Sousa, motion picture producer Adolph Zukor, newspaper publisher Harry Chandler, and numerous other media, corporate, and political leaders who were present for the annual Gridiron Dinner.

The Willard family sold its share of the hotel in 1946, and due to mismanagement and the severe decline of the area, the hotel closed without a prior announcement on July 16, 1968. The building sat vacant for years, and numerous plans were floated for its demolition. In 1975, the National American Indian Council announced it had purchased the building for its headquarters. It eventually fell into a semi-public receivership and was sold to the Pennsylvania Avenue Development Corporation. They held a competition to rehabilitate the property and ultimately awarded it to the Oliver Carr Company and Golding Associates. The two partners then brought in the InterContinental Hotels Group to be a part owner and operator of the hotel. The Willard was subsequently restored to its turn-of-the-century elegance and an office-building wing was added. The hotel's reopening on August 20, 1986, amid great celebration, was attended by several U.S. Supreme Court justices and U.S. senators. In the late 1990s, the hotel once again underwent significant restoration. Among its facilities are numerous luxury guest rooms, several restaurants, the Round Robin Bar, the Peacock Alley series of high-end shops, and large function rooms.

== Notable guests ==
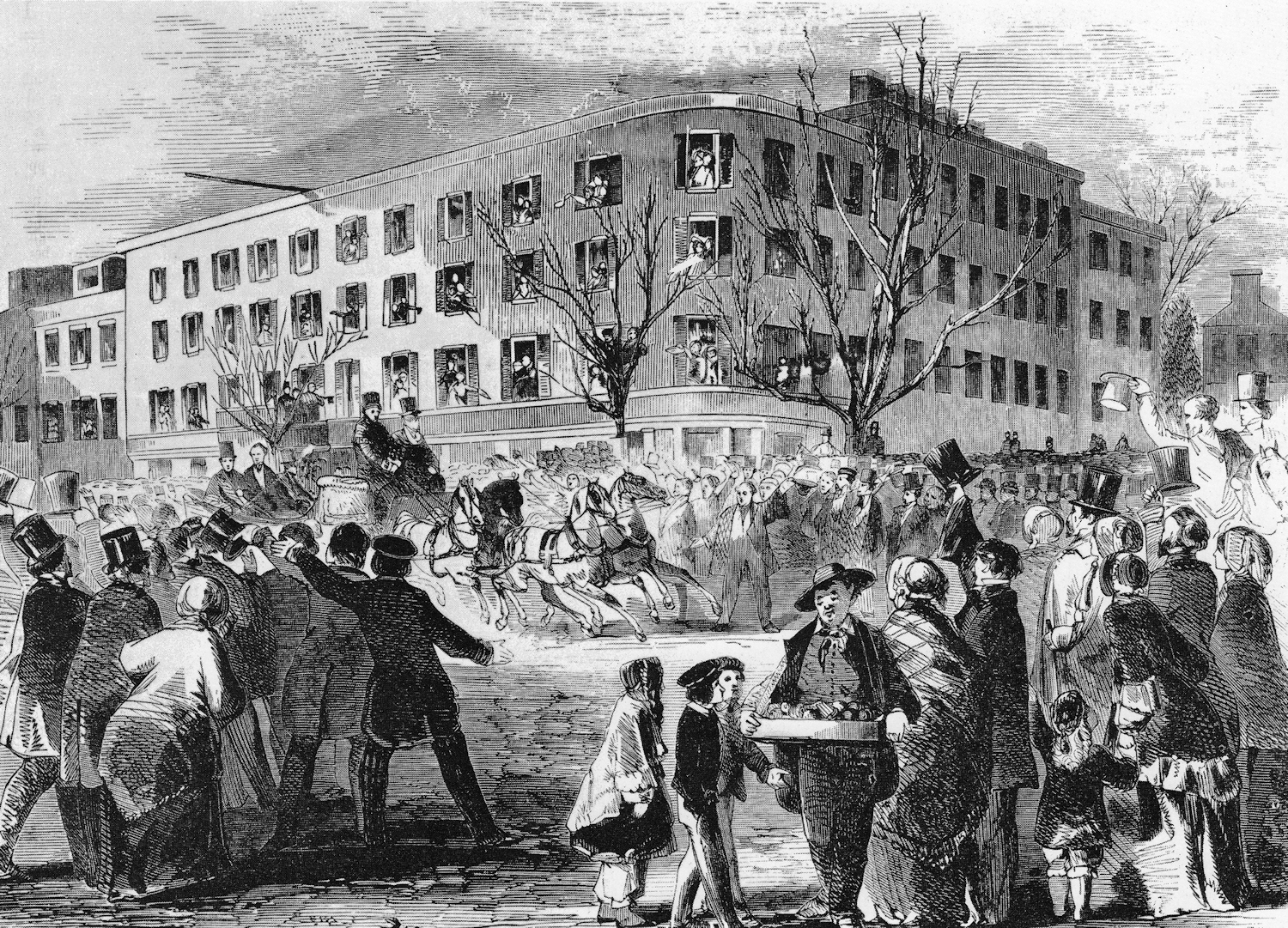
Franklin Pierce departs from Willard's Hotel for his inauguration, March 1853

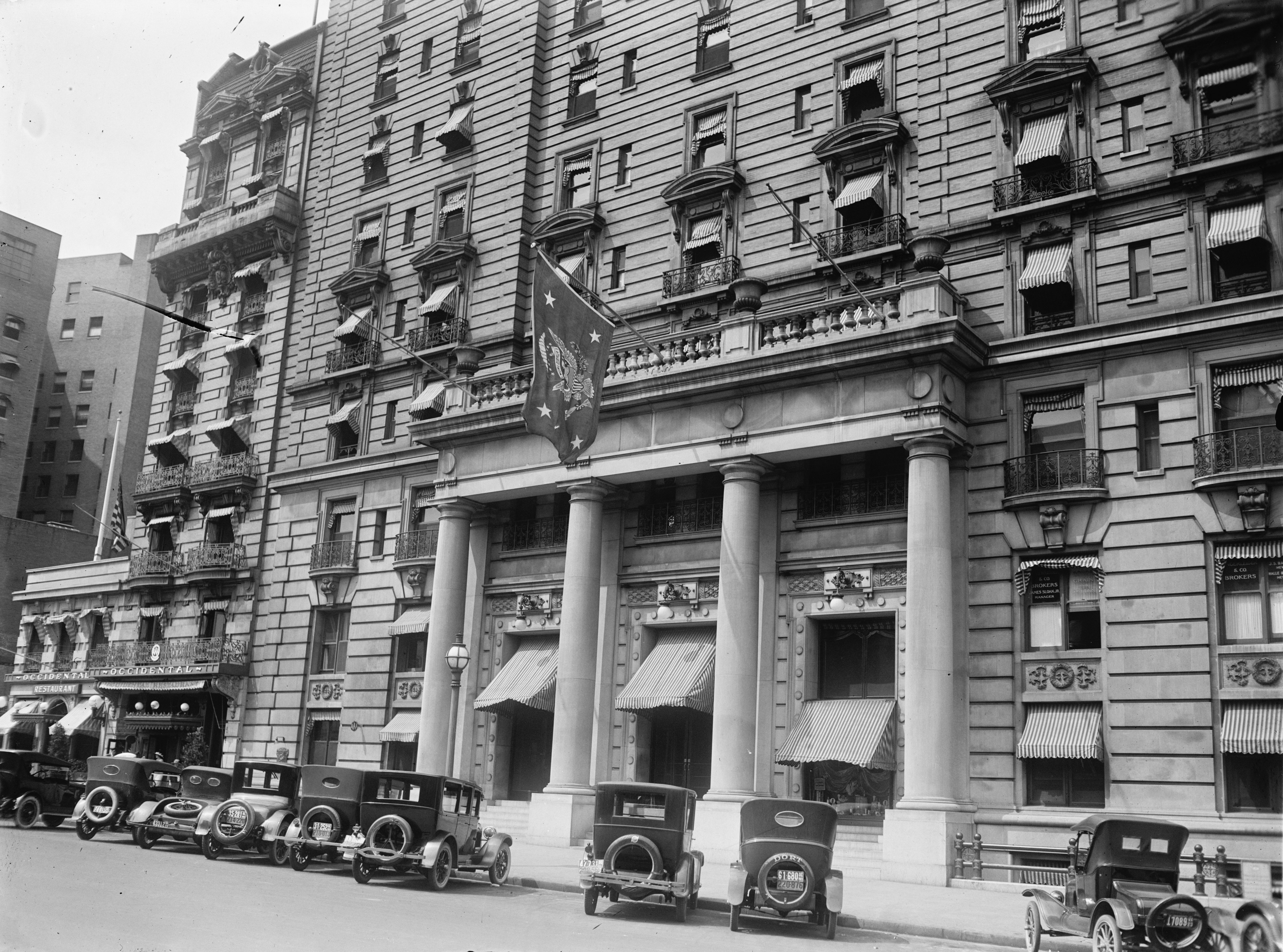
The Willard Hotel flying the presidential flag in the 1920s, indicating the President of the United States was on the premises.

The first group of three Japanese ambassadors to the United States stayed at the Willard with seventy-four other delegates in 1860, where they observed that their hotel room was more luxurious than the U.S. Secretary of State's house. It was the first time an official Japanese delegation traveled to a foreign destination, and many tourists and journalists gathered to see the sword-carrying Japanese.

In the 1860s, author Nathaniel Hawthorne wrote that "the Willard Hotel more justly could be called the center of Washington than either the Capitol or the White House or the State Department."

From February 4 to February 27, 1861, the Peace Congress, featuring delegates from 21 of the 34 states, met at the Willard in a last-ditch attempt to avert the Civil War. A plaque from the Virginia Civil War Commission, located on the Pennsylvania Ave. side of the hotel, commemorates this courageous effort. Later that year, upon hearing a Union regiment singing "John Brown's Body" as they marched beneath her window, Julia Ward Howe wrote the lyrics to "The Battle Hymn of the Republic" while staying at the hotel in November 1861.

On February 23, 1861, amid several assassination threats, detective Allan Pinkerton smuggled Abraham Lincoln into the Willard; there Lincoln lived until his inauguration on March 4, holding meetings in the lobby and carrying on business from his room.

On March 27, 1874, the Northern and Southern Orders of Chi Phi met at the Willard to unite as the Chi Phi fraternity.

Many United States presidents have frequented the Willard, and every president since Franklin Pierce has either slept in or attended an event at the hotel at least once; the hotel hence is also known as "the residence of presidents." Ulysses S. Grant first stayed there as a lieutenant in 1852. It was his habit to drink whiskey and smoke a cigar while relaxing in the lobby. Folklore (promoted by the hotel) holds that this is the origin of the term "lobbying," as Grant was often approached by those seeking favors. However, this is probably false, as Webster's Ninth New Collegiate Dictionary dates the verb "to lobby" to 1837. Grover Cleveland lived there at the beginning of his second term in 1893, because of concern for his infant daughter's health following a recent outbreak of scarlet fever in the White House. Six sitting vice-presidents have lived in the Willard. Millard Fillmore and Thomas A. Hendricks, during his brief time in office, lived in the old Willard; and then four successive vice-presidents, James S. Sherman, Thomas R. Marshall, Calvin Coolidge and finally Charles Dawes all lived in the current building for at least part of their vice-presidency. Fillmore and Coolidge continued in the Willard, even after becoming president, to allow the first family time to move out of the White House.

The first recorded meeting of the American Association for Cancer Research was convened at the Willard on May 7, 1907.

Plans for Woodrow Wilson's League of Nations took shape when he held meetings of the League to Enforce Peace in the hotel's lobby in 1916.

A fire broke out in April 1922 while Calvin Coolidge was staying in the building. Attempting to re-enter the building, he was asked to identify himself to the fire marshal, to which he responded, "I'm the Vice President." The fire marshal's response was "What are you vice president of?"

Several hundred officers, many of them combat veterans of World War I, first gathered with the General of the Armies, John J. "Blackjack" Pershing, at the Willard Hotel on October 2, 1922, and formally established the Reserve Officers Association (ROA) as an organization.

In 1935 the hotel was used as a place of confinement for William P. MacCracken Jr., Assistant Secretary of Commerce for Aeronautics, after he was convicted of contempt of Congress in the Air Mail scandal. According to The Washington Post, "Chesley Jurney, the Senate sargeant at arms, had no place to hold MacCracken who, after being sentenced, showed up at Jurney's house and stayed the night. The next day he was confined to a room at the Willard Hotel."

During World War II the British government rented several of the Willard's floors for its supply organization. Jean Monnet had his office there. In 1997 a memorial plaque was erected near the hotel's entrance to commemorate this episode.

Martin Luther King Jr., wrote his famous "I Have a Dream" speech in his hotel room at the Willard in 1963, in the days leading up to his August 28 March on Washington for Jobs and Freedom.

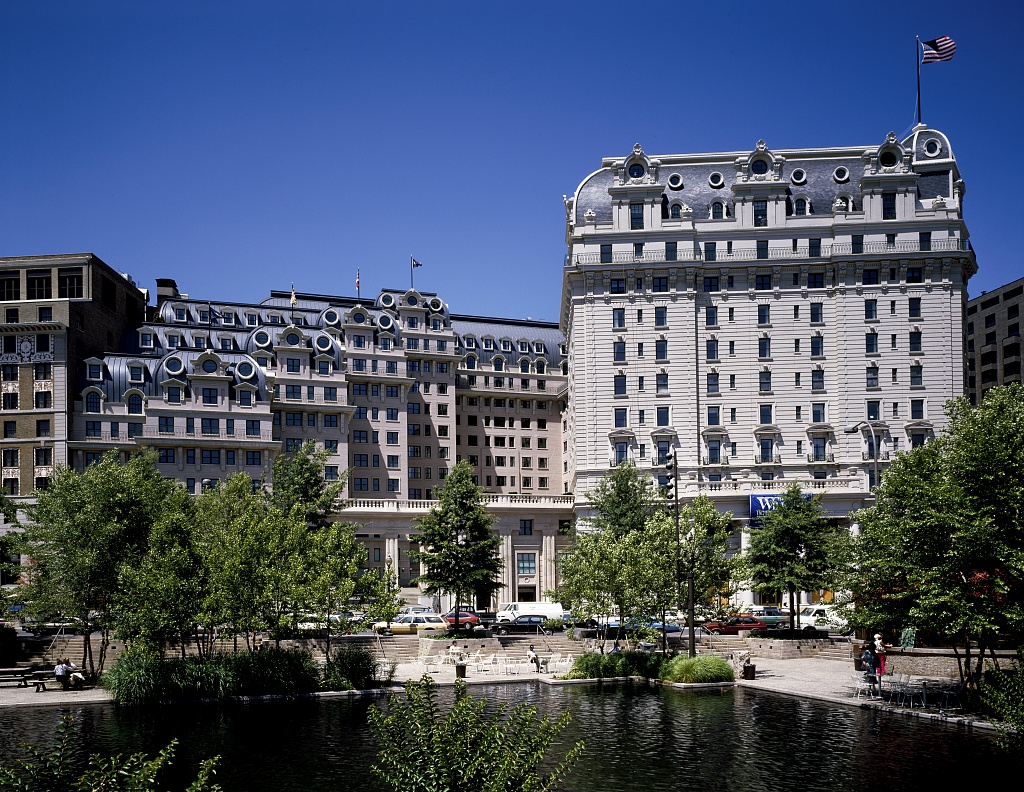
The Willard Hotel in the 1980s with Pershing Park (now the National World War I Memorial) in the foreground.

Among the Willard's many other famous guests are P. T. Barnum, Mark Twain, Walt Whitman, General Tom Thumb, Samuel Morse, the Duke of Windsor, Harry Houdini, Gypsy Rose Lee, Gloria Swanson, Emily Dickinson, Jenny Lind, Charles Dickens, Bert Bell, Joe Paterno, and Jim Sweeney.

Steven Spielberg shot the finale of his film Minority Report at the hotel in the summer of 2001. He filmed with Tom Cruise and Max von Sydow in the Willard Room, Peacock Alley and the kitchen. A replica of the terraced roof of the office building was constructed on a soundstage for the final scene.

On February 22, 2012, Australian Foreign Minister Kevin Rudd gave a dramatic resignation speech in the hotel's Douglas Room.

In the days leading up to the 2021 January 6 United States Capitol attack, a series of rooms and suites in the hotel functioned as an informal command center headed by Donald Trump's personal lawyer Rudolph Giuliani for a White House plot to overturn the results of the 2020 election.

The 12th president of South Korea, President Moon Jae-in stayed in the hotel during his 2021 visit.

Indian Prime Minister Narendra Modi stayed in the hotel during his 2023 visit.

== Rating ==
The Willard is a member of Historic Hotels of America, the official program of the National Trust for Historic Preservation.

The AAA gave the hotel four diamonds out of five in 1986. The hotel has maintained that rating every year, and received four diamonds again for 2016. Forbes Travel Guide (formerly known as Mobil Guide) declined to give the hotel either four or five stars in 2016, but did add it to its list of "recommended" properties. In July 2024, Americas Great Resorts added the hotel to its Top Picks as a landmark property.

== Gallery ==
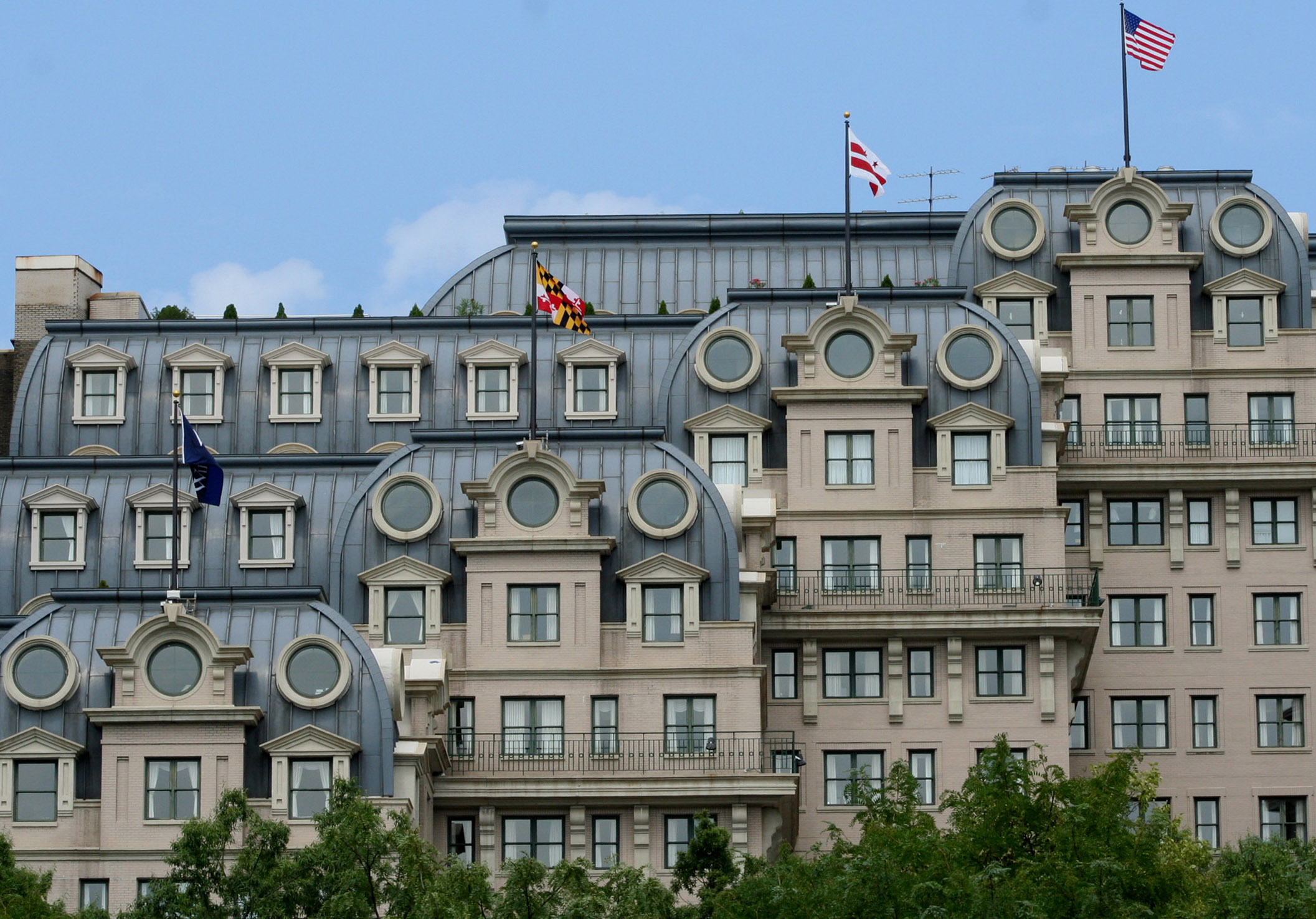
The Willard Office Building, built in 1986 and designed to blend with the historic hotel

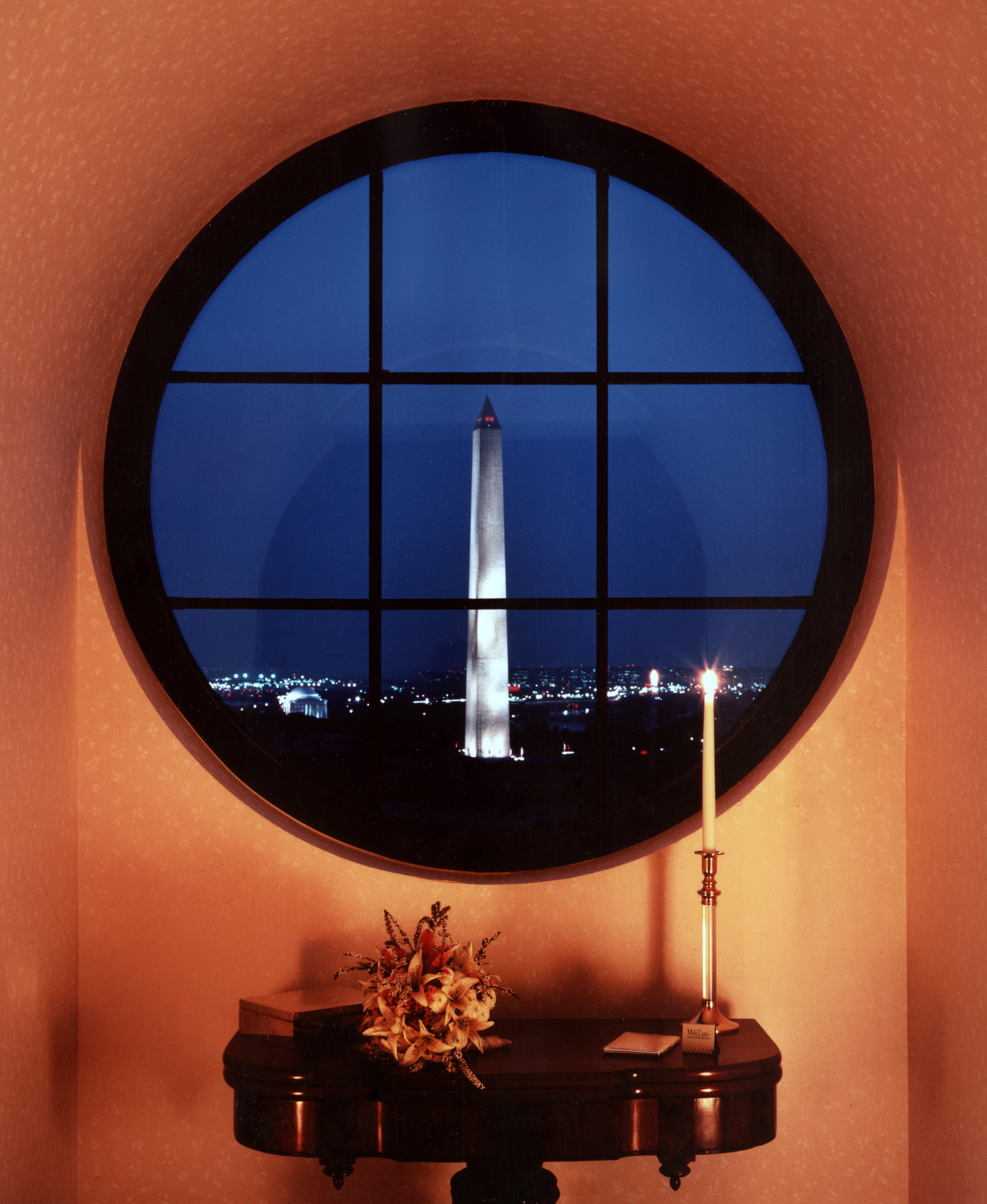
The Washington Monument as viewed from the Willard Hotel by Carol M. Highsmith

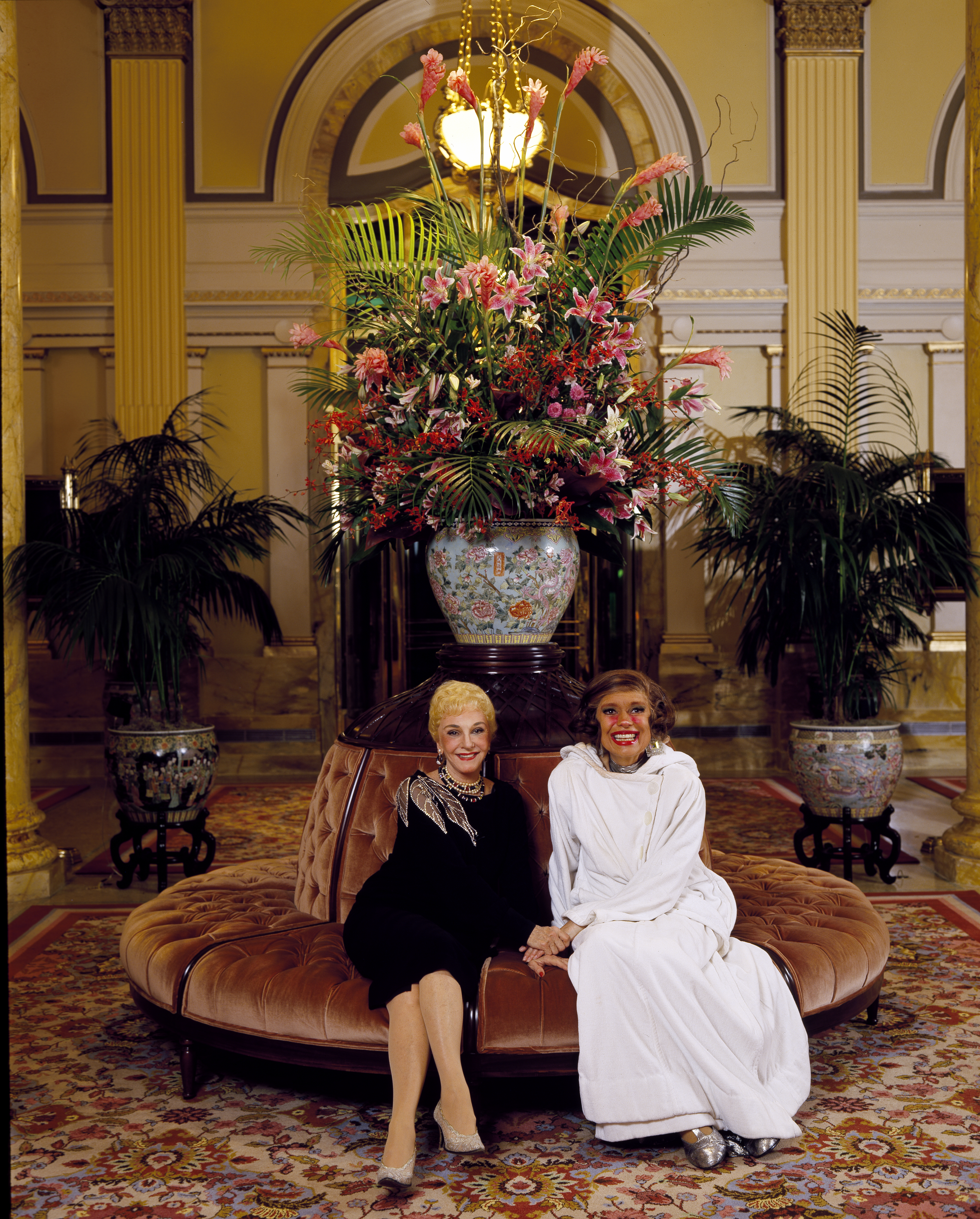
Mary Martin and Carol Channing in lobby, 1986, stars of the touring play Legends!

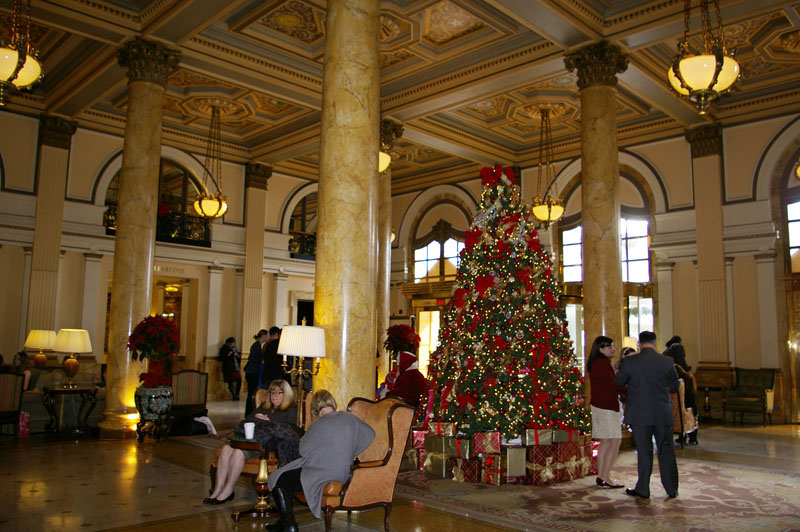
Willard Lobby, Christmas 2014

== See also ==
- List of Historic Hotels of America
- Jim Hewes, bartender at the Willard's Round Robin Bar
- Architecture of Washington, D.C.

== Bibliography ==
- Burlingame, Michael. With Lincoln in the White House: Letters, Memoranda, and Other Writings of John G. Nicolay, 1860–1865. Carbondale, Ill.: SIU Press, 2006.
- Denby, Elaine. Grand Hotels: Reality and Illusion. London: Reaktion Books, 2004.
- Hogarth, Paul. Walking Tours of Old Washington and Alexandria. McLean, Va.: EPM Publications, 1985.
- Moeller, Gerard Martin and Weeks, Christopher. AIA Guide to the Architecture of Washington, D.C. 4th ed. Baltimore: JHU Press, 2006.
- "Notables Routed By Top Floor Fire In Willard Hotel." New York Times. April 24, 1922.
- Tindall, William. Standard History of the City of Washington From a Study of the Original Sources. Knoxville, Tenn.: H.W. Crew & Co., 1914.
- Willard, Henry Kellogg. "Henry August Willard: His Life and Times." Records of the Columbia Historical Society. 1917.
