= 1962 in art =

Events from the year 1962 in art.

== Events ==
- February 6–March 4 – Jane Frank, solo exhibition at the Corcoran Gallery of Art in Washington, D.C.
- February 7 – Opening of this year's "Young contemporaries" student exhibition at the RBA Galleries in London at which David Hockney exhibits his four "Demonstrations of Versatility" (1961): A Grand Procession of Dignitaries in the Semi-Egyptian Style, Swiss Landscape in a Scenic Style (retitled Flight into Italy - Swiss Landscape ), Tea Painting in an Illusionistic Style and Figure in a Flat Style. Hockney first meets Patrick Procktor at this exhibition and, with Maurice Agis, John Bowstead and Peter Phillips, Hockney's work is selected for a further exhibition at the ICA.
- February 10
  - Erwin Eisch, Lothar Fischer, Dieter Kunzelmann, Renee Nele, Heimrad Prem, Gretel Stadler, Helmut Sturm and Hans-Peter Zimmer are excluded from the Situationist International (SI).
  - Roy Lichtenstein's first solo exhibition opens at Leo Castelli's gallery in New York City, including Look Mickey, featuring his first employment of Ben-Day dots, speech balloons and imagery from comics.
- March 15 – Ansgar Elde and Jørgen Nash are excluded from the Situationist International.
- March 25 – BBC Television in the United Kingdom broadcasts Ken Russell's film Pop Goes the Easel in its Monitor series, exploring the British pop art movement.
- April 7 – The Stanley Spencer Gallery opens in Spencer's home village of Cookham, England, to display his work.
- April 10 – Robert Fraser sets up his gallery, specializing in contemporary British art, in the Mayfair district of London.
- May – The comic book character The Incredible Hulk, created visually by Jack Kirby, is introduced.
- May–June – David Smith creates the Voltri series of abstract sculptures (e.g. Voltri XV) in Italy.
- May 25 – The new Coventry Cathedral, designed by Basil Spence, is consecrated in England; artworks incorporated include: the exterior sculpture St Michael's Victory over the Devil by Sir Jacob Epstein; the tapestry Christ in Glory in the Tetramorph, designed by Graham Sutherland; the Mater Dolorosa sculpture by John Bridgeman; the Baptistry window by John Piper and Patrick Reyntiens; and the engraved glass Screen of Saints and Angels by John Hutton.
- late June – Bert Stern begins shooting The Last Sitting in New York City, the last series of photographs taken of Marilyn Monroe, originally for Vogue magazine; later published as a book.
- July 9 – Andy Warhol's first solo California gallery exhibition as a fine artist opens at the Ferus Gallery, Los Angeles, California, marking the West Coast debut of pop art and featuring his Campbell's Soup Cans.
- July 23 – The Mohamed Mahmoud Khalil Museum is opened in Cairo.
- July 25 – The Queen's Gallery is opened to the public at Buckingham Palace, London.

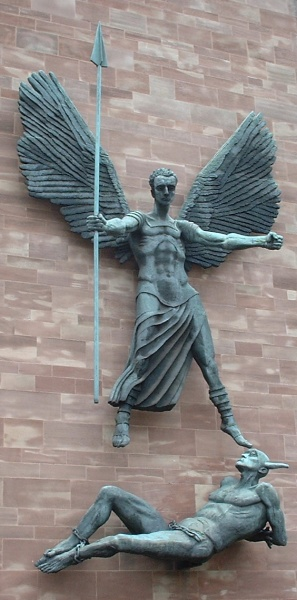
Epstein's St Michael's Victory over the Devil at Coventry Cathedral

- August – The comic book character Spider-Man, created visually by Steve Ditko, is introduced.
- September 25 – The Pasadena Art Museum mounts New Painting of Common Objects, a survey of contemporary American Pop Art.
- October 23 – "Fifty California Artists" exhibition at Whitney Museum of American Art, New York, NY. 1962-1963. Catalogue published. Organized by San Francisco Museum of Art with assistance of Los Angeles County Museum of Art. Circulated to Walker Art Center, Minneapolis, MN; Albright-Knox Art Gallery, Buffalo, NY; Des Moines Art Center, IA. Notable artists in exhibition include Elmer Bischoff, Bruce Conner, Roy De Forest, Richard Diebenkorn, George Herms, John Paul Jones, Edward Kienholz, Frank Lobdell, Nathan Oliveira, Ed Moses, Lorser Feitelson, Helen Lundeberg and Peter Voulkos.
- October 31 – The Sidney Janis Gallery mounts International Exhibition of the New Realists, a survey of contemporary American Pop Art and the European Nouveau Réalisme movement and the first Pop Art group exhibition in an 'uptown gallery' in New York City, a rented storefront at 19 W. 57th Street, near the main gallery at 15 E. 57th Street. Robert Motherwell, Mark Rothko, Philip Guston and Adolph Gottlieb quit the Janis Gallery as a protest against the exhibition.
- November 14 – The British General Post Office issues the first commemorative stamps to be designed by David Gentleman.
- December 14 – Leonardo da Vinci's early 16th-century painting the Mona Lisa is assessed for insurance purposes at US$100 million before touring the United States for several months, the highest insurance value for a painting in history. However, the Louvre, its owner, chooses to spend the money that would have been spent on the insurance premium on security instead.
- Michelangelo Pistoletto begins painting on mirrors.
- Ernst Barlach House completed as an art museum in Hamburg, Germany.
- City Hall Museum and Art Gallery established in Hong Kong.
- The Institute of American Indian Arts is set up in Santa Fe, New Mexico.
- Musashino Art University.
- National Art Museum of China opens in Beijing.
- Museo de Arte Español Enrique Larreta inaugurated in Buenos Aires, Argentina.
- The comic book character Barbarella, created by Jean-Claude Forest, is introduced in France.
- Frederic Leighton's painting Flaming June (1895) is rediscovered in London.

== Exhibitions ==
- New Painting of Common Objects (with works by Wayne Thiebaud, Roy Lichtenstein, Andy Warhol, Jim Dine, Phillip Hefferton, Joe Goode, Edward Ruscha, and Robert Dowd) at the Pasadena Art Museum curated by Walter Hopps.

== Awards ==
- Archibald Prize: Louis Kahan – Patrick White

== Works ==
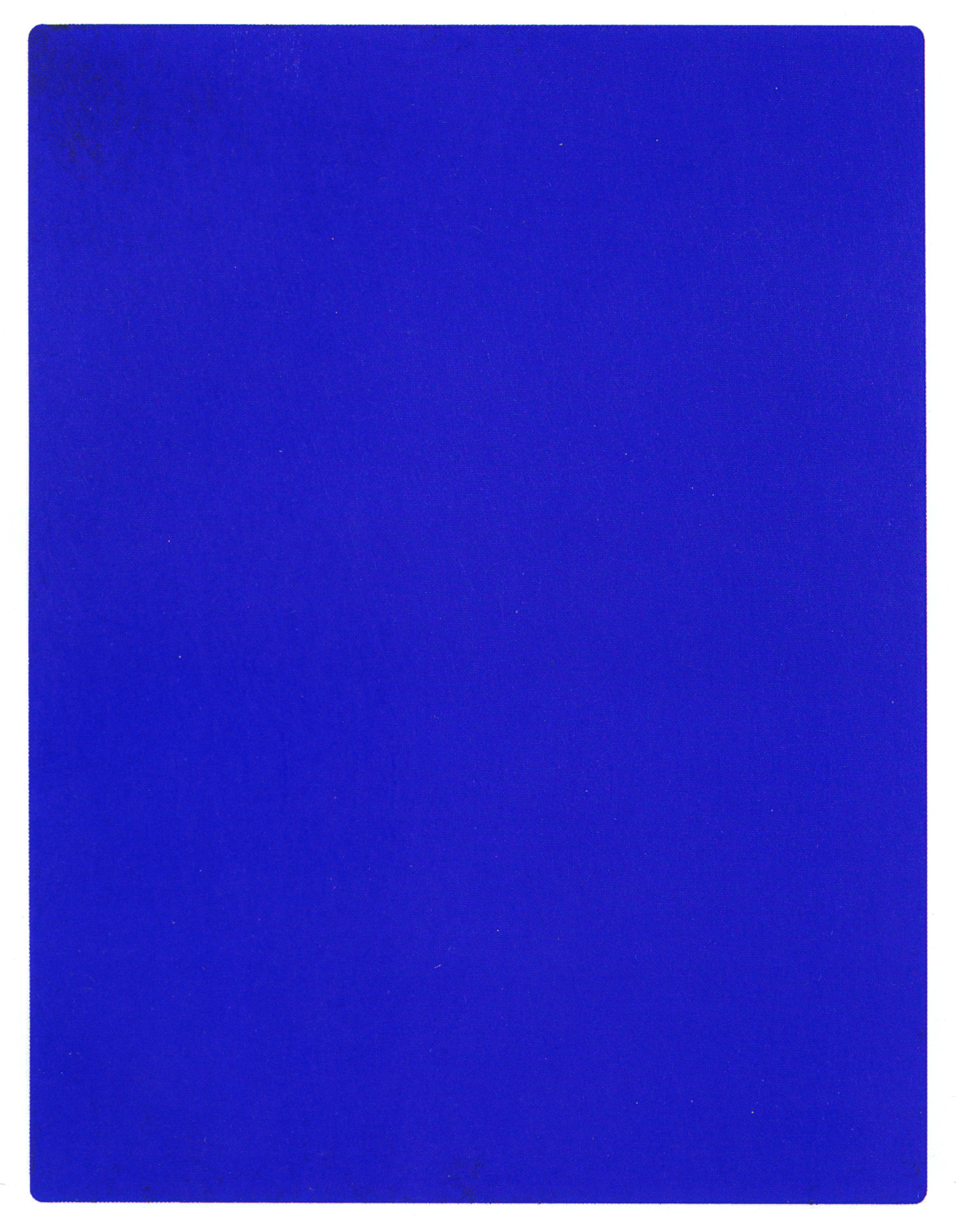
Yves Klein – IKB 191

- Billy Apple – 2 Minutes, 33 Seconds (sculpture)
- Diane Arbus – Child with Toy Hand Grenade in Central Park (photograph)
- Alexander Calder – Sky Hooks (sculpture)
- Anthony Caro – Early One Morning (painted metal sculpture)
- Pietro Consagra – Conversation with the Wind (steel sculpture)
- Jean Dubuffet – Court les rues
- Yves Klein
  - IKB 191
  - Immaterial Pictorial Sensitivity
- Julio Le Parc - Light in Movement
- Norman Lewis - Evening Rendezvous
- Roy Lichtenstein
  - Blam
  - Brattata
  - Golf Ball
  - Jet Pilot
  - Kiss II
  - Masterpiece
  - Portrait of Madame Cézanne
- L. S. Lowry – Station Approach
- Kazuyuki Matsushita and Hideki Shimizu – International Fountain, Seattle
- Henry Moore – Knife Edge Two Piece 1962–65
- Otto Muehl and followers of Viennese Actionism – Die Blutorgel (performance art)
- Isamu Noguchi – Floor Frame
- William Roberts – The Vorticists at the Restaurant de la Tour Eiffel, Spring 1915
- David Shepherd – The Wise Old Elephant
- Jeffrey Smart – Cahill Expressway
- Jean Tinguely – Study for an End of the World No. 2 (self-destroying sculpture)
- Marie Vorobieff – Homage to Friends from Montparnasse
- Andy Warhol
  - Campbell's Soup Cans (completed)
  - S&H Green Stamps
  - One Dollar Bill (Silver Certificate)
  - 200 Soup Cans
  - 200 One Dollar Bills
  - Big Campbell's Soup Can with Can Opener (Vegetable)
  - Coca-Cola (3)
  - Green Coca-Cola Bottles
  - Gold Marilyn Monroe
  - Marilyn Diptych
  - Flavor Marilyns
  - 129 Die in Jet!
  - Men in Her Life
- David Wynne
  - The Breath of Life Column (Hammersmith)
  - John Gielgud (bronze busts)

== Films ==
- Pop Goes the Easel (directed by Ken Russell)

== Births ==
- 1 February – Takashi Murakami, Japanese pop artist
- 13 April – Chris Riddell, South African-born English children's book illustrator and political cartoonist
- 27 April – Gabriel Orozco, Mexican visual artist
- 2 May – Alexandra Boulat, French photographer (d. 2007)
- 9 May – Gary Hume, English painter
- 22 May – Hannah Rothschild, English art museum board member, documentary film maker, writer and philanthropist
- 9 July – Luis Altieri, Argentine visual artist

== Deaths ==
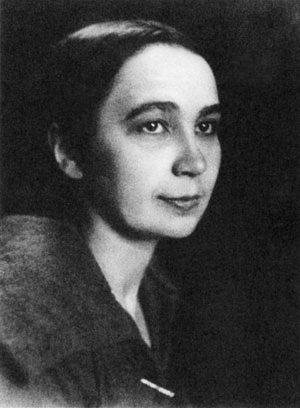
Natalia Goncharova

- January 24 – André Lhote, French Cubist painter (b. 1885)
- March 19 – Ethel Sands, American-born English painter (b. 1873)
- March 27 – Augusta Savage, African American sculptor (b. 1892)
- April 7 – Mary Cecil Allen, Australian-born American painter (b. 1893)
- April 23 – Harold Parker, Australian sculptor (b. 1873)
- May 13 – Franz Kline, American abstract expressionist painter (b. 1910)
- May 19 – Gabriele Münter, German painter (born 1877)
- May 25 – Zora Petrović, one of the most significant representatives of Expressionism of color in Serbian art between two wars (b. 1894)
- June 6 – Yves Klein, French painter (b. 1928)
- August 2 – Clare Atwood, English painter (b. 1866)
- August 31 – Frank O. Salisbury, English portrait and official painter (b. 1874)
- September 7 – Morris Louis, American color field painter (b. 1912)
- October 17 – Natalia Goncharova, Russian avant-garde artist (b. 1881)
- December 28 – Karl Völker, German painter and architect (b. 1889)

== See also ==
- 1962 in fine arts of the Soviet Union
