= 3 Coke Bottles =

1962 painting by Andy Warhol

3 Coke Bottles is a painting by Andy Warhol, which he completed in 1962.

== Painting ==
During Warhol's early career, he experimented with many differt confectionery items, most notably Campbell's Soup Cans, but also Coca-Cola bottles. Around the same period, namely between 1961 and 1963, Warhol produced numerous Coca-Cola inspired artworks, which have now been recognized as a collection of Coca-Cola works. Warhol completed the painting in 1962, as a part of a wider collection of Coca-Cola themed art.

3 Coke Bottles was one painting from this series of works, but they also included Coca-Cola (3), Coca-Cola (4) and Green Coca-Cola Bottles. It is often confused for the better known Coca-Cola (3), despite the two paintings being entirely different. The painting contains 3 green colored Coca-Cola bottles, with the red coca-cola logo underneath. Coca-Cola (3) is an entirely different artwork, a large black and white painting.

A number of the paintings from the series have regularly fetched record amounts since 2010 for artwork containing the Coca-Cola brand.
