= Front and Back Dollar Bills =

1962 painting by Andy Warhol

- Artist: Andy Warhol
- Year: 1962
- Medium: Silkscreen ink and pencil on linen, in two parts
- Movement: Pop Art
- Dimensions: 210.8 cm × 48.3 cm (83.0 in × 19.0 in)
- Owner: Private collection

Front and Back Dollar Bills is a 1962 painting by American artist Andy Warhol. It consists of two vertically oriented panels depicting enlarged images of the front and back of a one-dollar bill. The work belongs to Warhol's early Dollar Bill series, made during his first experiments with silkscreen printing.

== Background ==
Throughout the 1950s, Andy Warhol established a successful career in New York as a commercial illustrator, specializing in advertising and women's shoes. His work in commercial art gave him extensive familiarity with the visual language of advertising and the consumer culture of postwar America. He was also attracted to the glamour, money, and branded products that characterized that culture.

By the early 1960s, Warhol was seeking a transition from commercial illustration to fine art, and he began depicting subjects drawn from popular culture. He initially painted images based on comic strips, but abandoned the approach after learning that Roy Lichtenstein was already producing similar works. Warhol sought suggestions from friends about possible subjects. Art curator Henry Geldzahler encouraged him to focus on ordinary, commercially available objects, while art dealer Muriel Latow suggested that he paint what he liked most: money. Warhol subsequently began producing paintings of dollar bills alongside works depicting Coca-Cola bottles, Campbell's soup cans, and movie stars. The dollar bill became one of his recurring subjects as he developed the silkscreen technique that would become central to his practice.

== Technique and production ==
Front and Back Dollar Bills was produced at Warhol's home studio at 1342 Lexington Avenue in New York. Warhol initially produced pencil drawings and hand-painted works of United States one-dollar, two-dollar, five-dollar, and ten-dollar bills followed by silkscreen works in which the images could be mechanically reproduced. The dollar-bill paintings were among Warhol's earliest sustained experiments with silkscreen printing. In a 1977 interview, Warhol recalled, "I started [silkscreening] when I was printing money. I had to draw it, and it came out looking too much like a drawing, so I thought wouldn't it be a great idea to have it printed. Somebody said you could just put it on silkscreens."

Despite the mechanical reproducibility of the silkscreen process, the paintings retain a handmade quality. Warhol traced the dollar-bill design onto the screen and printed each impression individually. He used a grid of pencil lines to guide the placement of the screens, leaving some of these registration marks visible on the finished works. The irregularities of the printed surfaces, together with the hand-drawn outlines and variations in alignment, distinguish the paintings from the currency they depict. Warhol also enlarged the dollar-bill outline, differentiating his images from actual currency to avoid being accused of counterfeiting.

Front and Back Dollar Bills belongs to Warhol's early Dollar Bill series, which includes paintings of one-dollar and two-dollar bills made in 1962. Among the works from the series are 200 One Dollar Bills, 192 One Dollar Bills, Two Dollar Bills (Fronts), and Two Dollar Bills (Back) (40 Two Dollar Bills in Green).

== Description ==
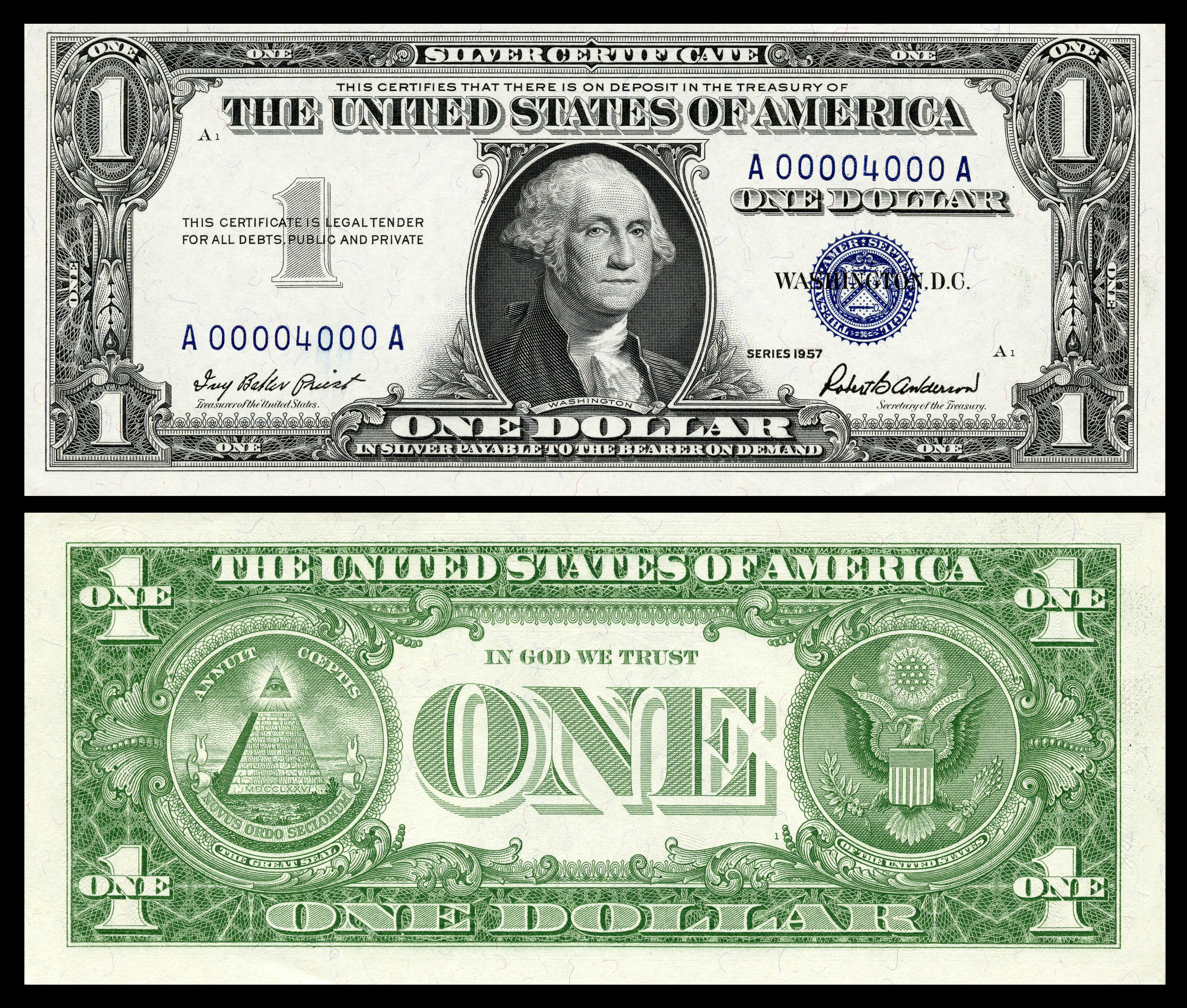
Front and back of 1957 series U.S. one-dollar silver certificate

The work is executed in silkscreen ink and pencil on canvas. It consists of two narrow vertical canvases hung side by side, each measuring 83 × 19 inches (210.8 × 48.3 cm). One panel depicts the front of a one-dollar bill, while the other depicts its reverse. The use of separate panels allows the front and back of the bill to be viewed simultaneously. The close proximity between the panels emphasizes the distinction between the front and reverse while the corresponding colors match that of an authentic dollar bill.

Although the two panels are individually signed and dated 1962 and 1963, respectively, the work has historically been dated to 1962 in museum records and scholarly publications.

== Interpretation ==
Front and Back Dollar Bills reflects Warhol's use of repetition as both a compositional strategy and an exploration of mass production. Art historian Neil Printz observed that the color coding of the two views allowed Warhol to vary the arrangement of his repeated imagery, "alternating fronts and backs, black impressions and green ones, in phase column by column."

Art critic David Bourdon argued that Warhol's serial images distinguished his work from that of Roy Lichtenstein, writing that "the grid organization implied mass production and uniformity and also possessed commercial overtones that he welcomed." Bourdon further observed that the repetition of individual images subsequently became "a central element of Warhol's aesthetic."

The work also links Warhol's use of repetition to his exploration of the connection between art and money. Art historian Richard Meyer argued that in Front and Back Dollar Bills, Warhol "literalized the idea of art as a way of making money. The accumulation of cash served as both the artist's subject and his intended goal. Meyer added that the silkscreening process allowed Warhol to "sustain visual interest within an overall logic of duplication" through "off-register, or otherwise idiosyncratic silk-screen impressions." Warhol himself described the appeal of silkscreening as "simple—quick and chancy," emphasizing the variations that could result from repeatedly printing the same image.

Warhol's own statements reveal his interest in transforming commonplace objects into subjects of art. In 1962, he told Time, "I just paint things I always thought were beautiful, things you use every day and never think about. I'm working on soups, and I've been doing some paintings of money. I just do it because I like it." Journalist Marguerite Lamkin, writing for the London Express Service, asked Warhol what he was trying to say through his paintings of every day items such as Campbell's soup cans. He replied, "I want to show the monotony in the way things are. You see these things every day and by painting them you realize how boring life really is."

In his 1975 book The Philosophy of Andy Warhol (From A to B & Back Again), he similarly connected art and commerce, stating, "During the hippie era people put down the idea of business—they'd say 'Money is bad' and 'Working is bad' but making money is art and working is art and good business is the best art." Elsewhere in the book, he said, "I like money on the wall. Say you are going to buy a $200,000 painting. I think you should take that money, tie it up, and hang it on the wall. Then when someone visited you the first thing they would see is the money on the wall."

== Provenance ==
The painting was owned by interior designer Jed Johnson, who was Warhol's longtime partner. Following Johnson's death in the TWA Flight 800 explosion in 1996, the work passed to his estate. It was subsequently acquired by Thomas Ammann Fine Art in Zürich and then by Galerie Bruno Bischofberger, also in Zürich. A private collector purchased the work directly from Galerie Bruno Bischofberger in 1998.

== Exhibitions ==
Front and Back Dollar Bills was exhibited at the Daimaru department stores in Tokyo and Kobe in 1974 in an exhibition of Warhol's work.

In 1989, it was included in the major retrospective Andy Warhol: A Retrospective, which traveled from the Museum of Modern Art in New York to the Art Institute of Chicago, Hayward Gallery in London, Museum Ludwig in Cologne, Palazzo Grassi in Venice, and Centre Georges Pompidou in Paris.

It was subsequently included in Les Couleurs de l'Argent at the Musée de La Poste in Paris (November 19, 1991 – February 1, 1992), Andy Warhol: Series and Singles at the Fondation Beyeler in Basel (September 17 – December 31, 2000), and SuperWarhol at the Grimaldi Forum in Monaco (July 16 – August 31, 2003).

== Auction history ==
In June 2015, Front and Back Dollar Bills was offered at Sotheby's Contemporary Art Evening Sale in London with a presale estimate of £12 million to £18 million ($18.3 million–$27.5 million). The work failed to sell after no bidder met its reserve. In the same sale, an earlier 1962 dollar-bill painting, One Dollar Bill (Silver Certificate), sold for £20.9 million ($32.8 million).

In June 2021, Front and Back Dollar Bills sold for £6.8 million ($9.4 million) at Sotheby's in London in its Modern & Contemporary Art Evening Sale.
