= Altieri =

Altieri is an Italian surname. It may refer to:

- Altieri family, a noble Italian family from Rome, whose most notable exponent was Pope Clement X (r. 1670–1676);

== Persons ==
Notable people with the surname include:

- Angelo Altieri (died 1472), Italian Catholic bishop
- Giambattista Altieri (1589–1654), Italian Catholic cardinal
- Vincenzo Maria Altieri (1724–1800), Italian Catholic cardinal
- Carlos Delgado Altieri (born 1960), Puerto Rican politician
- Charles Altieri, American academic
- Dario Altieri, American researcher from Philadelphia
- Elena Altieri (1910–1997), Italian actress
- Erik Altieri, American marijuana activist
- John Altieri (1969–2008), American singer and actor
- Kevin Altieri, American television director
- Lodovico Altieri (1805–1867), Italian Catholic cardinal
- Luis Altieri (born 1962), Argentine artist and yogi
- María Meléndez Altieri (born 1950), Puerto Rican politician
- Maria Luisa Altieri Biagi (1930–2017), Italian scholar and writer
- Michel Altieri (born 1978), Italian singer and actor
- Miguel Altieri, American academic
- Mitchell Altieri, American film director
- Willie "Two-Knife" Altieri (1891–1970), American mobster

== See also ==
- Cesar Altieri Sayoc Jr., an alleged attempted U.S. serial mail bomber
- Palazzo Altieri, palace in Rome
