= Golf ball (disambiguation) =

A golf ball is a ball used in the game of golf.

Golf ball or Golf Ball may also refer to:

- Golf Ball, a painting by the Roy Lichtenstein
- A typeball introduced with the IBM Selectric typewriter
- Radome, a structural, weatherproof enclosure that protects a radar antenna
- The 'Golf Balls', nickname for the radomes of the RAF Fylingdales base in North Yorkshire, England
- Golf Ball, a character from the first season of Battle for Dream Island, an animated web series
