= One Dollar Bill (Silver Certificate) =

1962 painting by Andy Warhol

- Artist: Andy Warhol
- Year: 1962
- Medium: Casein and pencil on linen
- Movement: Pop Art
- Dimensions: 132.4 cm × 182 cm (52.1 in × 72 in)

One Dollar Bill (Silver Certificate) is a 1962 painting by American artist Andy Warhol. Executed in casein and pencil on linen, it depicts an enlarged one-dollar Silver Certificate. It was the first dollar-bill painting made by Warhol and the only one of his dollar-bill paintings to be executed entirely by hand.

The painting was made at a pivotal point in Warhol's transition from commercial illustration to fine art. It was produced shortly before he began using silkscreen printing as his principal technique for creating repeated images. The dollar would subsequently become a recurring subject in Warhol's work, appearing in silkscreen paintings of one-dollar and two-dollar bills and, later, in his Dollar Sign paintings.

One Dollar Bill (Silver Certificate) sold at auction for $32.8 million in 2015.

== Background ==
Throughout the 1950s, Andy Warhol established a successful career in New York as a commercial illustrator, specializing in advertisements and illustrations of women's shoes. By 1961, Warhol began producing paintings based on comic strips and advertisements. Five of his comic-strip paintings were displayed in the window of the Bonwit Teller department store on Fifth Avenue in April 1961. Although he attracted collectors including Robert Scull and Emily Tremaine and Burton Tremaine, his efforts to secure gallery representation were unsuccessful. After seeing Claes Oldenburg's storefront installation The Store in December 1961, Warhol became dissatisfied with his comic-strip paintings, feeling that they were no longer sufficiently original. Seeking a new subject, he followed his friend Muriel Latow's suggestion that he paint what he liked most: money.

== Technique and production ==
Warhol was interested in finding methods that would allow him to reproduce images with greater consistency and speed. Before adopting silkscreen printing, he experimented with techniques including hand drawing, tracing, stenciling and rubber stamping. In an interview with Glenn O'Brien, Warhol later recalled, "I had to draw it [money]," but found that it "came out looking too much like a drawing." His assistant Nathan Gluck recalled that a printer initially refused to make a silk screen directly from a dollar bill, agreeing instead to reproduce a drawing made by Warhol.

For One Dollar Bill (Silver Certificate), Warhol commissioned photographer Edward Wallowitch to photograph currency. The painting was based on a photograph depicting three one-dollar bills. Warhol selected and enlarged the image before transferring it to the canvas by tracing a photographic projection.

The work therefore occupies a transitional position in Warhol's development. The image was derived from a mechanical photographic process, but the final painting was executed by hand. Warhol soon turned to silkscreen printing, which enabled him to reproduce photographic images repeatedly and became central to his practice.

== Description ==
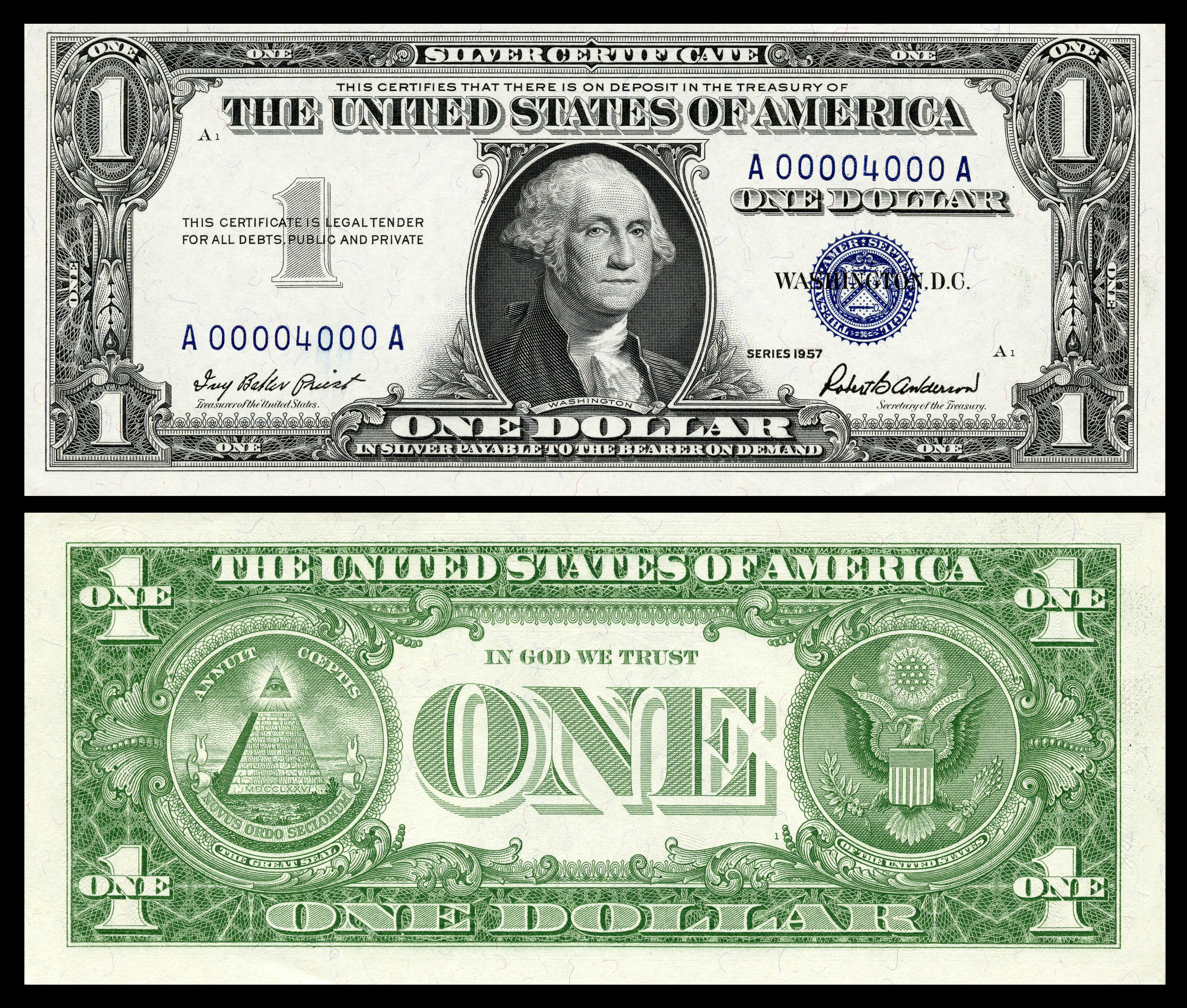
1957 series United States one-dollar silver certificate

The painting reproduces the front of a 1957 series United States one-dollar silver certificate on a large scale and measures 52 1/8 × 71 5/8 inches (132.4 × 182 cm). The faint folds that crease the bill's surface is evident in a slight sag in the word "States" in "United States of America."

Warhol rendered the bill in casein and pencil, tracing its imagery onto the linen from a photographic projection. The composition retains many of the graphic features of the original currency, including George Washington's portrait, the blue Treasury seals, inscriptions and ornamental borders. The enlarged image occupies most of the canvas, while variations in the density of the paint and pencil lines give portions of the bill an uneven, hand-drawn appearance.

Unlike Warhol's later dollar-bill paintings, which were produced using silkscreen printing and often repeat the image several times, One Dollar Bill (Silver Certificate) presents a single image.

== Interpretation ==
The dollar became a recurring subject in Warhol's work, appearing in paintings such as 200 One Dollar Bills (1962), Forty Two Dollar Bills (Fronts and Backs) (1962), Front and Back Dollar Bills (1962–63), and, Dollar Sign (1981). The subject brought together Warhol's interest in money, commercial imagery, and consumer culture with the economic and symbolic significance of currency in American society. In his 1975 book The Philosophy of Andy Warhol (From A to B & Back Again), Warhol wrote, "During the hippie era people put down the idea of business—they'd say 'Money is bad' and 'Working is bad' but making money is art and working is art and good business is the best art."

Like his Campbell's Soup Cans (1961–62), Warhol viewed money as an everyday commercial object that could be isolated from its ordinary context and presented on a work of art. In 1962, Warhol explained his interest in such imagery: "I want to show the monotony in the way things are. You see these things every day and by painting them you realize how boring life really is."

Art historian Neil Printz compared One Dollar Bill (Silver Certificate) with Warhol's 1962 Campbell's Soup Can (Pepper Pot) painting. He noted that the dollar bill is "corporealized by physical intervention" through faint folds suggested by its irregular silhouette, while the dark shadow beneath it separates the bill from the background, making it appear peeled from the canvas. Printz concluded that "the problem of representing money really translates into a drawing problem, a problem in drawing paper."

== Provenance ==
The painting was originally owned by Frederick W. Hughes, Warhol's business manager. It subsequently entered the collection of Galerie Bruno Bischofberger in Zürich. The next owner acquired it directly from the gallery in 1997.

== Exhibitions ==
The painting has been exhibited internationally, including at Galerie Bischofberger in Zürich in the exhibition Andy Warhol: Works from the Sixties (1992–93); Deichtorhallen Hamburg and the Württembergischer Kunstverein Stuttgart in Andy Warhol – Retrospektiv (1993–94); Ho-Am Art Gallery in Seoul in Andy Warhol: Pop Art's Superstar (1994); Kunstmuseum Luzern in Andy Warhol: Paintings 1960–1986 (1995); and Martin-Gropius-Bau in Berlin in Die Epoche der Moderne: Die Kunst im 20. Jahrhundert (1997).

The painting was also included in Andy Warhol: The Early Sixties. Paintings and Drawings 1961–1964, an exhibition at the Kunstmuseum Basel in 2010–11 that examined Warhol's early work and his use of source images and processes of transformation.

== Auction history ==
In July 2015, One Dollar Bill (Silver Certificate) was offered at Sotheby's in London as part of the contemporary art evening auction. It carried an estimate of £13 million to £18 million and sold for £20.9 million, equivalent to approximately $32.8 million, making it the highest price achieved for a contemporary artwork at a London auction during that week's sales.

== See also ==
- 1962 in art
