= Cahill Expressway (Smart) =

1962 painting by Jeffrey Smart

- Artist: Jeffrey Smart
- Year: 1962
- Type: oil on plywood
- Dimensions: 81.9 cm × 111.3 cm (32.2 in × 43.8 in)
- Location: National Gallery of Victoria, Melbourne

Cahill Expressway is a 1962 painting by the Australian artist Jeffrey Smart. The painting depicts the Cahill Expressway, a motorway in inner Sydney. It is "considered by many to be one of his finest works" and "perhaps his best-known picture". The work has been described as "startling ... for its recognisability as [a] Sydney scene and doubly so for its timeless quality."

The Woolloomooloo extension of the Cahill Expressway was opened in March 1962, the same year as Smart made his painting. The painting shows a view looking into the newly constructed tunnel under the Domain with the State Library on the left and the Shakespeare Memorial just above.

The composition is dominated by the curve of the freeway, one part of it sweeping upwards to what Chris Allen calls a "false horizon", the other disappearing into the darkness of the tunnel. The silhouetted figure on the memorial plinth surveys a scene that is hidden to us, over the new horizon, with a gesture reminiscent of those statues of Lenin, looking to a glorious future. Caught in the light on the median strip is a rather portly bald man, who is going nowhere. The whole composition is governed by a rigorous geometry, like that practised by the painter Smart admired, Piero della Francesca. [...] The scene is empty. The man appears to be lacking an arm: the sleeve of his jacket is tucked discreetly into his pocket.

— Kitty Hauser,

Smart said "The start of the compositional form of Cahill Expressway was the driveway, the sweep, the lovely shapes, the image of something [the tunnel] going underground and the city continuing above the ground. The figure is not the reason for the composition at all – he ends up there almost as an afterthought. ... I gave the fat man only one arm here, and his other sleeve is tucked neatly into his pocket, as a purely compositional thing."

The fat, bald man features in many of Smart's paintings. Along with a range of other solitary figures depicted in Smart's work, he is "often interpreted as the embodiment of modern alienation."

The Cahill Expressway is like a kind of allegorical self portrait. The man in the blue suit stands at the parting of two ways. One heads down into a dark tunnel, the other up to the light and to the monument on which a heroic figure raises his arm in a triumphant or inspirational gesture … The man in the suit is standing on the wrong side of the road, profiled against darkness, and he has lost an arm. Directly above him, the exultant attitude of the bronze figure makes his loss the more painful; and when we realise that the original figure on the monument, which stands outside the State Library of New South Wales, does not have a raised arm at all, it only serves to conform the suggestion that the man in the suit must climb the path of virtue and ambition to recover a lost wholeness.

— Christopher Allen

Resisting any interpretation or meaning behind the bald man's presence, Smart insisted that he was there to provide a sense of scale. As including people in his paintings could overly draw viewers' eyes, Smart attempted not to "make them too interesting; they are never beautiful or sexy" and he stated "a bald head makes a lovely volume and gives me a highlight.". Smart often mocked the idea of looking for meaning in his works: "That's what happens if you try to look too much into a picture ... You can't explain pictures."

The painting appeared on the cover of an edition of Peter Carey's collection of short stories, The Fat Man in History (1974). It also inspired a 1989 collection of short stories titled Cahill Expressway with the sub-title "twenty-nine Australian writers respond to Helen Daniel's invitation: stories based on Jeffrey Smart's painting Cahill Expressway".

The painting was acquired by the National Gallery of Victoria in 1963 and is part of its Australian art collection.
