= Big Campbell's Soup Can with Can Opener (Vegetable) =

1962 painting by Andy Warhol

- Artist: Andy Warhol
- Year: 1962
- Medium: Casein and graphite on linen
- Movement: Pop Art
- Dimensions: 183 cm × 132 cm (72 in × 52 in)

Big Campbell's Soup Can with Can Opener (Vegetable) is a 1962 painting by American artist Andy Warhol. Painted in casein and graphite on linen, it is an early hand-painted work from Warhol's Campbell's soup can series and the only known example in which a can opener is depicted. The painting directly predates Warhol's adoption of the silkscreen process, which became central to his practice later in 1962. The painting sold for $27.5 million at auction in 2017.

== Background ==
In the 1950s, Andy Warhol gained prominence as a commercial artist in New York, particularly for his illustrations of women's shoes and advertising work. In the early 1960s, he shifted from commercial illustration toward fine art, producing paintings based on comic strips and newspaper advertisements. He gained early exposure for these works when he incorporated them into a Bonwit Teller window display in April 1961.

Warhol's early comic-based paintings drew comparisons with the work of artist Roy Lichtenstein, whose comic-strip paintings had already attracted attention in New York. After being rejected by the Leo Castelli Gallery because of the similarity, Warhol expressed his desire to develop a subject that would distinguish his work from that of Lichtenstein and James Rosenquist. He increasingly turned to familiar commercial imagery, including Campbell's soup cans, dollar bills, and Coca-Cola bottles.

== Technique and production ==
In the early 1960s, Warhol experimented with hand painting, stenciling, and rubber stamp techniques as he sought to increase efficiency and incorporate serial repetition into his work. In late 1961, he began learning silkscreen printing from Floriano Vecchi of Tiber Press, making repeated visits to the printer and receiving advice on pigments and the handling of the squeegee. Although silkscreening would soon become central to his practice, Big Campbell's Soup Can with Can Opener (Vegetable) was made before Warhol fully adopted the process for his paintings.

Warhol began producing his Campbell's Soup Can paintings at his home studio at 1342 Lexington Avenue in New York in late 1961. The works were executed by hand rather than silkscreened, using traced outlines, painted forms, and stamped details. Between late 1961 and mid-1962, Warhol produced approximately fifty soup-can paintings, including the 32 canvases depicting individual Campbell's soup varieties that became the best-known group. The broader project also included large grid paintings of repeated cans and related still lifes. The photographs that Warhol used as a source had been taken by his former boyfriend Edward Wallowitch.

Although the serial nature of the paintings led some viewers to regard them as repetitions of essentially the same composition, Warhol varied their scale, format, and condition. The paintings range in height from approximately 20 inches to six feet. He most often depicted the cans in pristine condition, but also portrayed them with opened lids, torn labels, and other signs of damage. Among these was a smaller group of comparatively unusual and disfigured cans. In Big Campbell's Soup Can with Can Opener (Vegetable), an otherwise intact can of vegetable soup is shown at the moment its lid is being cut open by a can opener. A related work, Big Torn Campbell's Soup Can (Pepper Pot), depicts a damaged can with a torn and partially detached label.

Warhol was featured in the May 11, 1962, issue of Time in the article "The Slice-of-Cake School," alongside reproductions of Big Campbell's Soup Can with Can Opener (Vegetable) and 200 One Dollar Bills (1962). The article noted that Warhol was "currently occupied with a series of 'portraits' of Campbell's soup cans in living colour."

== Description ==
Measuring 72 x 52 inches (183 x 132 cm.), Big Campbell's Soup Can with Can Opener (Vegetable) depicts a large can of Campbell's condensed vegetable soup against a plain white background. A can opener is shown cutting into the metal lid at the upper right, leaving the can partially opened. Unlike Warhol's later silkscreen paintings of Campbell's Soup Cans, the image was executed by hand, with visible graphite underdrawing and brushwork.

== Exhibitions ==
Big Campbell's Soup Can with Can Opener (Vegetable) was first exhibited in the group exhibition American Painting and Sculpture from Connecticut Collections at the Wadsworth Atheneum in Hartford, Connecticut from to July to September 1962. It was the first Pop painting by Warhol to be exhibited in a museum.

The painting was subsequently exhibited at the Gallery of Modern Art in Washington, D.C., in 20th Century Paintings and Sculpture from Connecticut Collectors (September–October 1965); Sidney Janis Gallery in New York in Colossal Scale (March–April 1972); Katonah Gallery in American Painting, 1900–1976 (July–September 1976); and the Stamford Museum and Nature Center in The Eye of the Collector (April–May 1978). It was shown at the Mayor Gallery in London in American Paintings with Chinese Furniture (May–June 1987).

From 1989 to 1990, the painting was included in Andy Warhol: A Retrospective, which traveled from the Museum of Modern Art in New York to the Art Institute of Chicago, Hayward Gallery in London, Museum Ludwig in Cologne, Palazzo Grassi in Venice, and Musée National d'Art Moderne, Centre Georges Pompidou in Paris.

From March through June 2000, the painting was included in Twentieth-Century American Art: The Ebsworth Collection, organized by the National Gallery of Art in Washington, D.C. The exhibition was mounted at the Seattle Art Museum from August to November 2000.

== Critical reception ==
Reviewing the exhibition at the Wadsworth Atheneum, critic Stuart Preston of the The New York Times wrote that Warhol was "relentlessly painting one big Campbell soup can after another", describing the works as "big steps towards art that is socially to the point."

== Interpretation ==
Big Campbell's Soup Can with Can Opener (Vegetable) is the first in a group of large-scale Campbell's soup can paintings sometimes described as still lifes. Unlike Warhol's more static depictions of the unopened cans, the can opener introduces an element of action into the composition. Other works in the group depict the can with its lid progressively opened, its label removed, or the container crushed. Taken together, the variations have been interpreted as introducing ideas of temporality, transformation, and decay into Warhol's treatment of the mass-produced object.

Warhol emphasized the personal and aesthetic appeal of ordinary commercial objects rather than offering a specific explanation of their meaning. In 1962, he told Time, "I just paint things I always thought were beautiful, things you use every day and never think about. I'm working on soups, and I've been doing some paintings of money. I just do it because I like it." The following year, when Verne Berry of the Kalamazoo Gazette asked Warhol why he painted variations of Campbell's soup cans, Warhol replied, "It was something that was important to me when I was a child."

== Provence ==
The painting was acquired by collectors Emily Hall Tremaine and Burton Tremaine shortly after they visited Warhol's studio in 1962. It was subsequently acquired by Ted Ashley, a former executive of Warner Bros. In 1987, it was acquired by American art collector Barney A. Ebsworth, becoming the first postwar American artwork to enter his collection. Ebsworth retained the painting for more than two decades and included it in exhibitions of his collection.

== Auction history ==
In May 2010, Big Campbell's Soup Can with Can Opener (Vegetable) sold for $23.8 million at Christie's in New York. The work was subsequently resold at Christie's in New York for $27.5 million in May 2017.

== See also ==
- 1962 in art
