= Coca-Cola (4) =

1962 painting by Andy Warhol

- Artist: Andy Warhol
- Year: 1962
- Movement: Pop Art

Coca-Cola (4), also known as Large Coca-Cola, is a pop art painting by Andy Warhol. He completed the painting in 1962 as a part of a wider collection of Coca-Cola themed paintings, including Coca-Cola (3) and Green Coca-Cola Bottles, also completed in the early to mid-1960s.

The painting is of a large black and white Coke bottle, made of acrylic, pencil and Letraset on canvas. Coca-Cola (4) is almost a foot taller than the 6-foot Coca-Cola (3).

== Ownership ==
Coca-Cola (4) was purchased nearly immediately after its creation by art patrons Mr. and Mrs. Melvin Hirsh of Beverly Hills. It was acquired from Irving Blum's Ferus Gallery, the site of Andy Warhol's first solo exhibition, the Campbell's Soup Can show in 1964.

It was given to Christie's in New York in 1983, and was then acquired by Sotheby's auction house.

The painting sold for $35.36 million in 2010, surpassing its original estimate of $25 million. Upon its purchase, Sotheby’s said Coca-Cola (4) “is a landmark in the artist’s creation of his pop art style." The buyer of the painting was hedge fund manager Stephen A. Cohen.

== Coca-Cola art origins ==
Warhol's Coca-Cola art started in the 1950s with a drawing of a Coke bottle next to a pair of legs. His attention was turned to the pop art movement in the 60s, as well, with pop paintings based on comics and ads. Warhol tore out Coca-Cola ads from magazines to use them in collages. Coca-Cola (2) was pivotal in Warhol's style transition from hand-painted pieces to silkscreens, with a composition first sketched in black and gray, then hand painted, as a blend of pop abstraction.

In Warhol's 1975 book, The Philosophy of Andy Warhol, he said, “You can be watching TV and see Coca-Cola, and you know that the President drinks Coke, Liz Taylor drinks Coke, and just think, you can drink Coke, too. A Coke is a Coke and no amount of money can get you a better Coke than the one the bum on the corner is drinking. All the Cokes are the same and all the Cokes are good. Liz Taylor knows it, the President knows it, the bum knows it, and you know it."

Coca-Cola (4) differs from the first two in the series, Coca-Cola (1) and Coca-Cola (2) because it has less of a free-hand style, thanks to the use of Letraset letters for the patent notice located on the front of the bottle.
