= Pauline Karpidas =

British art collector

- Born: 1943 (age 82–83); Manchester, UK
- Spouse: Constantinos 'Dinos' Karpidas
- Children: Panos Karpidas

Pauline Karpidas née Parry (born 1943) is an English contemporary art collector, private art space benefactor, socialite, and patron of the arts. She lives in the United States.

== Early life and career ==
Pauline Karpidas was born Pauline Parry in Manchester in 1943. Parry was raised in a working-class family, growing up in a two-up two-down house. Her father suffered from epilepsy and was unable to work, so her mother acted as the breadwinner, working as a cleaner. At 15, Parry attended secretarial college, becoming an office PA at 18. A year later, she began modelling and moved to London. In her early twenties, Parry relocated to Athens, where she opened a clothing boutique called My Fair Lady in the port of Piraeus. There, she met Greek shipping magnate Constantinos 'Dinos' Karpidas.

== Art collection ==
In the mid-1970s, Pauline Karpidas met the Greek-American gallerist Alexander Iolas at a cocktail party in Athens. Iolas was a champion of European surrealism and credited with aiding its introduction to the US. He had mentored influential collectors including Dominique de Menil but was semi-retired by the time he met the Karpidases. Pauline persuaded Iolas to advise her on building an art collection, with Karpidas describing it as "the start of a great journey with a great mentor [...] He was the one who said, 'You must train your eye, you must visit every museum in every city, you must read and understand about the twentieth century'."

Karpidas is a patron of young artists whose work she displayed at Hydra Workshop, her waterfront gallery in an old ship-repair garage of a mansion once belonging to the Bulgari family in Hydra, Greece; she first visited Hydra in the early 1960s. Each Summer, since 1999, she has been hosting over 100 guests on Hydra to view the latest additions to her Ophiuchus Collection on display at the Hydra Workshop. Over the years, she worked with Sadie Coles on hosting work by many artists at the Hydra Workshop, including Wilhelm Sasnal (2004), Urs Fischer (2007), Carroll Dunham (2008), Nate Lowman (2010), Sergej Jensen (2010), Frank Benson (2011), Matt Johnson (2011), Mark Grotjahn (2011) and Ryan Sullivan (2013).

In a 2007 interview with journalist Marina Fokidis, Karpidas said of her Hydra Gallery,

Having lived now for almost 35 years in Greece, and having been part of the Greek heritage through my marriage to my late husband, Constantine Karpidas, this is a way for me to continue his legacy, his involvement with and support of the arts.

In 2009, Karpidas auctioned the Andy Warhol painting 200 One Dollar Bills, which she had bought with her late husband Constantine Karpidas. Characterizing the 1962 painting, art dealer Tony Shafrazi said, "We’ve seen nothing like this recently [come to auction], this is a masterpiece." The Karpidases paid $385,000 for the painting at a 1986 Sotheby's sale. After a dramatic "bidding war", the painting realized $43.8 million. Karpidas made more than 100 times what had been paid in 1986.

In September 2025, Karpidas auctioned the contents of her London residence The Lancasters, a stucco-fronted terrace overlooking Hyde Park. The two-day event featured 250 lots and sold for £101m against an estimate of £60m, the highest price Sotheby's had ever placed on a single-owner sale in Europe. Highlights of the auction included works by Leonora Carrington, Andy Warhol and René Magritte. More than half of the lots in the evening sale on 17 September had never before been offered at auction, and three-quarters hadn't been seen for 25 years. Karpidas described the auction as "by no means an ending", adding that she would "continue to live among art, read books, collect new works and support artists, as I have done for so many years now."

== Philanthropy ==
Karpidas is a benefactor of the Tate and the Sir John Soane's Museum in London, and an education centre at New York's New Museum is named after her and her late husband—The Pauline and Constantine Karpidas Education Center.

In 2012, Karpidas donated a vast sum of money to the University of Manchester, particularly to the Manchester Access Programme, including the Karpidas Excellence Scholarship. The donation also included 90 contemporary works of art for the museum's art museum, The Whitworth.

== Literature ==
- Coles, Sadie & Karpidas, Pauline (ed.) Package Holiday: New British Art in the Ophiuchus Collection (1997) Works by Damien Hirst, Tracey Emin, Sam Taylor-Wood, Gary Hume, Angus Fairhurst, Paul Noble, Sarah Lucas, Don Brown, Chris Ofili, Richard Patterson, Peter Doig
