= Christopher Allen (critic) =

Australian art historian, critic and educator (born 1953)

Christopher Allen (born 1953) is an Australian art historian, critic, and educator.

== Biography ==
Born in Algiers to Australian parents, Allen was educated in the United Kingdom, Vietnam, Japan, France and Australia. He graduated in 1975 from the University of New South Wales with a Bachelor of Arts in French (First Class Honours, University Medal) and won a scholarship to study for his Maîtrise ès lettres (Master of Arts) at the University of Aix-en-Provence and the Collège de France. Allen was the inaugural manager at the Performance Space in Redfern in 1983. In 1992, he completed his PhD at the University of Sydney.

He was art critic for The Sydney Morning Herald from 1987 until 1991 and for the Australian Financial Review from 2005 until 2008. Since 2008 he is the national art critic for The Australian, the last major daily with a regular contributing critic.

Allen has taught art history and theory at the National Art School from 1997 until 2008. He is Senior Master in Academic Extension at Sydney Grammar School since 2009 and teaches Classical Greek, Latin and senior Art History. He was appointed to the Library Council of New South Wales (State Library) Board in 2019 for three-year term.

In his critiques of works and artists, Allen emphasises craftmanship, skill, and formal and aesthetic qualities. He deplores "bland, decorative surface[s]" and he points to "pseudo-political contemporary art", especially as expressed in the wall labels in museums. Large-scale portraits, as commonly submitted to the Archibald Prize, are regular subjects of his criticism.

== Personal life ==
Allen is the grandson of World War II Major General Arthur Samuel "Tubby" Allen, the son of novelist and short story writer Robert Allen, and brother of poet, performer and filmmaker Richard James Allen. He is married to Australian prize-winning painter Michelle Hiscock. Her portrait of Allen was submitted to the 2022 Archibald Prize.

== Publications ==
=== As author ===
- La tradition du classicisme : essai sur la pratique et la théorie de la peinture classique de la Renaissance au dix-septième siècle français, thesis University of Sydney (1991)
- Art in Australia: From Colonization to Postmodernism (Thames & Hudson, 1997) ISBN 9780500203019
- French Painting in the Golden Age (Thames & Hudson, 2003) ISBN 9780500203705
- Charles-Alphonse Dufresnoy, De Arte Graphica (translation and commentary, Librairie Droz, Geneva 2005, with Yasmin Haskell, Frances Muecke), on Charles Alphonse du Fresnoy's De arte graphica
- "Jeffrey Smart: Unpublished Paintings 1940–2007", essay (Philip Bacon Galleries, 2008) ISBN 9780975124598, on Jeffrey Smart
- Salient: Contemporary Artists at the Western Front: 1918–2018 One Hundred Years On (King Street Gallery on William, 2018) ISBN 9780648086345

=== As editor/contributor ===
- Richard Goodwin, editor (Oliver Freeman Editions, 1992) ISBN 9781875613021, on Richard J. Goodwin
- Ari Purhonen, editor (1992) ISBN 978-1875613014
- Van Gogh: His Sources, Genius and Influence (1993) ISBN 9781875460076
- Philip Hardie, ed. (2002). "Ovid in art". The Cambridge Companion to Ovid. Cambridge University Press. pp. 336–367. doi:10.1017/CCOL0521772818.022. ISBN 978-0-521-77528-1.
- A Companion to Australian Art, editor (Wiley-Blackwell, 2021), ISBN 978-1-118-76758-0
- John West-Sooby, ed. (2024). "3. On art: Some Australian artists in France: 1830s–1930s". What have the French ever done for us? – French contributions to Australia's cultural life. Wakefield Press. ISBN 9781923042346.

=== As translator ===
- Thuillier, Jacques, Christopher Allen (translator). Poussin before Rome. exh. cat. New York: Richard Feigen (1995) ISBN 978-1-873232-03-3
