= Golf Ball =

Painting by Roy Lichtenstein

- Artist: Roy Lichtenstein
- Year: 1962
- Movement: Pop art
- Dimensions: 81.3 cm × 81.3 cm (32.0 in × 32.0 in)
- Location: Private collection

Golf Ball (sometimes Golfball) is a 1962 painting by Roy Lichtenstein. It is considered to fall within the art movement known as pop art. It depicts "a single sphere with patterned, variously directional semi-circular grooves." The work is commonly associated with black-and-white Piet Mondrian works. It is one of the works that was presented at Lichtenstein's first solo exhibition and one that was critical to his early association with pop art. The work is commonly critiqued for its tension involving a three-dimensional representation in two dimensions with much discussion revolving around the choice of a background nearly without any perspective.

== History ==
When Lichtenstein had his first solo show at the Leo Castelli Gallery in February 1962, it sold out before opening. Golf Ball was one of the works that Lichtenstein exhibited. Later, Lichtenstein included Golf Ball in Still Life with Goldfish Bowl, 1972, and Go for Baroque, 1979. The painting exemplifies the novel superimposition of abstraction and figuration. The work also represents abstraction as a result of elimination of three-dimensionality, chiaroscuro and a landscape context.

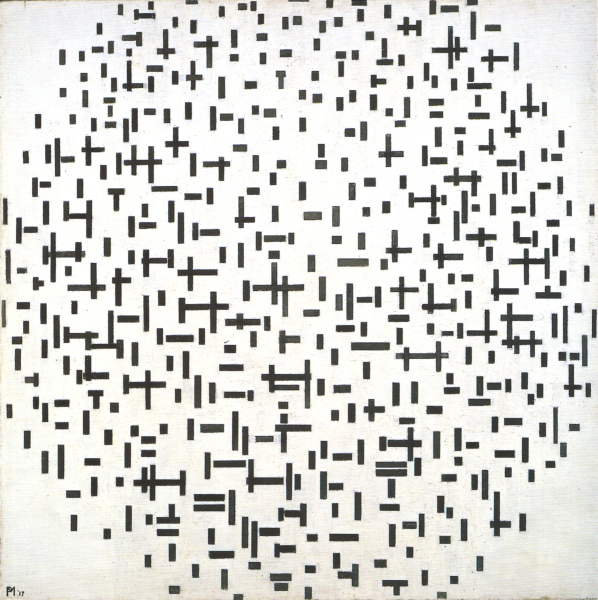
Golf Ball is said to reflect the black and white elements of Compositions in Black and White, 1917, Piet Mondrian.

The use of black and white is regarded as dramatic, and although it may have been influenced by 1940s and 1950s works of Willem de Kooning, Franz Kline and Robert Motherwell, it is more likely a commentary on Mondrian's 1917 Composition in Black and White. Alternatively, it may have been a reference to another of Mondrian's pre-World War I black and white oval paintings, such as Pier and Ocean, 1915. This complementary source art was common of Lichtenstein's 1960s work on frequently advertised objects. Lichtenstein describes his sources as Mondrian Plus and Minus paintings.

== Description ==
In 1962, Lichtenstein produced several works in which he depicted "the repetitive regularity of their patterned surfaces." Golf Ball is a depiction of a golf ball using a Mondrianesque set of black and white arcs to depict the three-dimensionality of the subject. However, the neutral background manipulates the image and diminishes the volumetric characteristics by stripping the viewer of his perspective. It is described as a "pure graphic mark on a gray ground" as well as a "totality of abstract marks." Lichtenstein described Golf Ball as "the antithesis of what was thought of as having 'art meaning'" because of its lack of perspective.

Golf Ball is an example of the emerging "confident authority" of his single-image paintings with its "Rock of Gibraltar-like thereness". The "frontal and centralized presentation"'s directness lacked the sophistication to market the images of household goods for advertising but was considered daring artistically. The black and white painting on a grey background challenges both the natural perception of realism and the boundaries of abstraction. The work "gives us both the impression of space and the fact of surface".

Golf Ball was one of the bases by which "critics aligned him with other practitioners of Pop Art", although much is made about the painting's references to abstract painting, especially its likeness to Mondrian's works. Furthermore, the painting leverages tensions regarding three-dimensional representation in two dimensions resulting from spatial ambiguities caused by the lack of cues in the background.

== Reception ==
Diane Waldman refers to the subject of Golf Ball as a freestanding form. This is one of the figures in which Lichtenstein demonstrates his draftsman experience. This work demonstrated his maturation as an artist with standardized contours that present uniformity and solidified inflections. This is a strong example of presenting the tension of volumetric potential balanced against two-dimensional presentation. It also shows how placement against a neutral background diminishes three-dimensionality. Despite Lichtenstein's techniques to display/minimize dimensionality, the viewer imposes his or her own visualization experiences on the painting, which minimizes the effect of spatial illusion.

== See also ==
- 1962 in art
