= Jed Johnson =

Jed Johnson may refer to:

- Jed Johnson (Oklahoma politician) (1888–1963), American politician
- Jed Johnson Jr. (1939–1993), American politician, son of the above
- Jed Johnson (designer) (1948–1996), American interior designer and film director
