= Maria Luisa Altieri Biagi =

Italian scholar and writer (1930–2017)

- Born: 9 April 1930; Venice, Italy
- Died: 29 November 2017 (aged 87); Bologna, Italy
- Education: University of Bologna
- Occupations: Scholar and writer
- Writing career
- Period: 1974–present
- Notable works: Linguistica essenziale Grammatica del testo

Maria Luisa Altieri Biagi (9 April 1930 – 29 November 2017) was an Italian scholar and writer.

== Life ==
Altieri Biagi graduated from the University of Florence, where she studied Linguistics, and was a professor of the History of the Italian language at the University of Trieste since 1967, and at the University of Bologna since 1974.

Her numerous studies have helped to promote a knowledge of the Italian language, stylistics and jargons.

She wrote essays on the language of important historical characters, as Galileo Galilei and Francesco Redi.

She was further a member of Crusca Academy and of Science Academy of Bologna. Biagi died on 29 November 2017 in Bologna, aged 87.

== Works ==
- Galileo e la terminologia tecnico-scientifica, Florence, Olschki, 1965;
- Lingua e cultura di Francesco Redi, medico, Florence, Olschki, 1968:
- (with G. Devoto) La lingua italiana. Storia e problemi attuali, Torino, ERI, 1968;
- La lingua in scena, Bologna, Zanichelli, 1980;
- (with Bruno Basile) Scienziati del Seicento, Milan-Naples, Ricciardi, 1980;
- (with Bruno Basile) Scienziati del Settecento, Milan-Naples, Ricciardi, 1983;
- Linguistica essenziale, Milan, Garzanti, 1985;
- La grammatica dal testo, Milan, Mursia, 1987;
- L'italiano dai testi, Milan, Mursia, 1988;
- L'avventura della mente. Studi sulla lingua scientifica dal Due al Settecento, Naples, Morano, 1990.
