= Jeffrey Smart =

Australian artist (1921–2013)

Jeffrey Smart AO
- Jeffrey Smart. Photo by Michel Lawrence.
- Born: Frank Jeffrey Edson Smart; 26 July 1921; Adelaide, South Australia
- Died: 20 June 2013 (aged 91); Montevarchi, Tuscany, Italy
- Known for: Landscape painting
- Movement: Modernism
- Awards: Commonwealth Jubilee Art Prize (1951); Honorary Doctorate (1999); Officer of the Order of Australia (2001)

Frank Jeffrey Edson Smart AO (26 July 1921 – 20 June 2013) was an expatriate Australian painter known for his precisionist depictions of urban landscapes that are "full of private jokes and playful allusions".

Smart was born and educated in Adelaide where he worked as an Art teacher. After departing for Europe in 1948 he studied in Paris at La Grande Chaumière, and later at the Académie Montmartre under Fernand Léger. He returned to Australia 1951, living in Sydney, and began exhibiting frequently in 1957. In 1963, he moved to Italy. After a successful exhibition in London, he bought a rural property called "Posticcia Nuova" near Arezzo in Tuscany. He resided there with his partner until his death. A major retrospective of his works travelled around Australian art galleries 1999–2000.

== Life ==
Jeff Smart, as he was generally known for the first thirty years of his life, was born in Adelaide in 1921. He started drawing at an early age. "My parents would give me large sheets of paper, often the backs of posters or calendars ... anything". He was educated at Pulteney Grammar School and Unley High School, and originally wanted to become an architect. However, after studying at the Adelaide Teachers College and the South Australian School of Art and Crafts in 1937–1941, he taught art in schools for the South Australian Education Department in 1942–1947. In the early 1940s he accompanied local maritime artist, John Giles, in painting industrial landscapes at Port Adelaide. He joined the Royal South Australian Society of Arts around 1941 and was elected vice-president in 1950.

Smart travelled to Europe in 1948, studying in Paris at La Grand Chaumière and later the Académie Montmartre under Fernand Léger. "As my technique grew, I found I could paint those things I liked looking at, those slum streets behind the city apartments". In 1950 he lived on the island of Ischia in the bay of Naples, where he painted with Donald Friend, Michael Shannon and Jacqueline Hick.

In 1951, he moved to Sydney and spent the next 2 years there as an art critic for the Daily Telegraph newspaper (1952–54), an arts compere called "Phidias" for the ABC children's radio programme The Argonauts, and a drawing teacher at the National Art School (1956–1962). From 1956 to 1962, he also presented on ABC TV's Children's Hour. Smart was also employed by The King's School, Parramatta from 1954 to 1956 as an art teacher, following Jean Bellette (known there as Mrs Haefliger) and John Passmore. He exhibited throughout this period at the Macquarie Galleries.

Smart departed Australia for London on the Castel Felice out of Sydney just after Christmas 1963, driving to Greece with fellow painter Justin O'Brien. In 1965 he returned to Italy, and lived there for the rest of his life, regarding himself as an "Australian living abroad" and carrying an Australian passport. His last work, Labyrinth, was completed in 2011, at which point he announced his retirement.

Smart died of renal failure in Arezzo on 20 June 2013, aged 91.

== Influences and artistic style ==
Smart's almost iconic and unique imagery was heavily influenced by various artists and art forms. His stark portrayals of contemporary life, both realistic and absurd, have been the basis of many artistic discussions. Critics and admirers of Smart's paintings often debate his subject matter but in interviews Smart has preferred not to discuss his style; "Leaving the interpretation as the prerogative of the individual viewer." Smart states that he "paints a picture because he likes the shape", and when asked why his skies are always so gloomy and smog-laden or why his faces never wear a smile, he claims "I need a dark sky for the composition, because pale blue at the top of a frame looks nothing ... [and] because a smiling face is too hard to paint".

Smart's unsentimental paintings encompass lonely urban vistas. Isolated individuals often appear lost in industrial wastelands, high rise construction, or concrete street-scapes. His work balances eeriness with harmony and equilibrium. One title 'The express rape of the landscape', refers to the freeways, street signs, trucks, oil drums, containers, buildings and concrete dividers that are the ever-present subjects of his work.

Figures are present in many of Smart's paintings. These are said to be "impassive observers, reconciled to the contemporary state of things, prepared to accommodate themselves to an increasingly impersonal environment" or as "statements on the dehumanising conformity of modern architecture and social painting". According to Smart however, "the truth is I put figures in mainly for scale". It is Smart's precise and unequalled attention to clean lines, composition and geometrics that make his eye-catching paintings stand-out "in the story of modern Australian art". "The subject matter is only the hinge that opens the door, the hook on which hangs a coat. My only concern is putting the right shapes in the right colours in the right places. It is always the geometry".

Under the tutorship lessons of modernist artist, Dorrit Black, Smart acquainted himself with the 'Golden Mean.' Also referred to as 'the golden ratio', 'the divine proportion', 'the mean of Phidias' and a number of other names, it has been used since ancient Greek times in many works of art and architecture. The golden mean is a geometric proportion, the ratio of which is approximately 1:1.618. This complex network of interlocking rectangles, triangles and diagonal lines, is used to calculate the structure of Smart's paintings, which form the basis of all his artworks. For Smart, geometry and precision of the composition is the key to successful art, much like how comedic timing is the key to the effectiveness of a punch line. "Today's most prevalent myth is that Smart's work has no content: that everything is a compositional exercise devoted to capturing a formal ideal of beauty".

=== Smart's surrealism ===
Smart's paintings have been referred to as 'surreal', but Smart contended that it was the modern urban world that was surreal and not his depictions of it. "I find myself moved by man in his new violent environment. I want to paint this explicitly and beautifully ... only very recently have artists again started to comment on their real surroundings".

Some critics have argued that Smart's work comments on modern urban alienation, a post-industrial landscape that has fallen from human control. Others have cast him as a realist, hyper-realist, 'off-beat classicalist' and a metaphysical painter. Some critics have even referred to Smart's paintings as portraying 'Orwellian gloom' – a statement referring, in particular, to George Orwell's literary political masterpiece, Nineteen Eighty-Four. James Gleeson believes that Smart's paintings are "too real to be real"; and believes that his realist portrayals of 20th-century life are nothing more than superb geometrical compositions and bold colour, of man in his naturalistic, man-made environment. It is true, for instance, that trees are rarely seen in Jeffrey Smart's artworks, and the only grass is that growing between concrete stones, but as Smart claimed: "an artist has to be moved to move his viewers", and Smart was moved by man in nature – man-made nature – not concerned with typical Australian landscape. "I like living in the 20th century – to me the world has never been more beautiful. I am trying to paint the real world I live in, as beautifully as I can with my own eyes... It's obvious a bunch of flowers or a billabong is beautiful, and I love natural beauty, but I am not moved by it. ... to me composition is everything". Smart believed that people should view art with their eyes and not their head.

=== Influences ===
Smart's paintings may seem to visit an untouched area of art, but he has been influenced by other artists and art forms, especially from classical ancient art through his travels. An interest in architecture took Smart to Egypt, Greece, Turkey, Italy and Yemen. This Mediterranean journey led to the purchase of a three-hundred-year-old villa in Arezzo, Italy where he lived for the rest of his long life. It had in fact, always been an early goal for Smart was to become an architect; he was trained as a draftsman and sometimes considered himself in some ways a frustrated architect.

Piero della Francesca, a Renaissance painter and mathematician, was one of classical influences on Smart's work. Smart said that seeing Piero's works was "like falling in love." His favourite of Piero's paintings was The Flagellation of Christ. He shared with Piero, in addition to the geometrics and composition, the spatial grandeur and 'ineloquence' found present in each of their works. He was also influenced by Renaissance Dutch painter Rogier van der Weyden. Despite Smart's identification with the ancient art and architecture of the renaissance period, he likes to be recognised as a contemporary artist, not a 'classical revivalist'.

The two modernist realists who have had immense impact on Smart's paintings, are Alex Colville and Edward Hopper. Like Smart, Hopper painted "Human beings' values being swallowed by 20th century industrial society" and Hopper "shows that, even though communication and transportation have never been so accessible, the individual is somehow left behind in the rush". In his work, Hopper focuses on "eerily realistic depictions of solitude in contemporary American life", works of similar appearance to Smart's. Like Hopper's, Smart's paintings have been compared to post-war Italian movie stills of the 1950s and sixties – where beauty is poetically captured in the 'humdrum' Italian cities. Alex Colville painted desolate landscape settings with lonely characters, and used much the same geometric underpinning and bold colours.

== Technique ==
Smart regarded being able to draw the human being as the single most important attainment of any artist. When asked why none of the people in his pictures are ever painted smiling, he said that he could not draw smiles well. Unlike many primarily landscape artists, he could paint both the human form and the human face, as can be seen in his self-portrait work. He regarded abstract painters as people who never learnt to draw. Smart mostly painted with oil, acrylic and watercolours, generally using the bold primary colours – yellow, blue and red – and dark greys for his skies. This created an unusual effect in his works as the foregrounds of his paintings are fully lit despite the dark sky. His process of painting was a long and arduous one, resulting in barely a dozen finished canvases a year. "I always do a lot of preliminary drawings, moving the forms, the shadows, the buildings the figures around the canvas till I get that perfect composition ..."

Much of Smart's direct artistic stimulation came from, literally, a passing glance as he was driving: "My paintings have their origins in a passing glance". "Sometimes I'll drive around for months ... despair, nothing, nothing, then suddenly I will see something that seizes me: a shape, a combination of shapes, a play of light or shadows and I send up a prayer because I know I have the gem of a picture."

== Images ==
Smart was a prolific artist; in the period 1939–1982 he produced at least 800 works, and was still producing new works in 2011 (at the age of 90). The following is a small selection of Smart's work, arranged in chronological order.

The list also indicates those works in public collections.

- AGNSW, Art Gallery of NSW (Sydney)
- AGSA, Art Gallery of SA (Adelaide)
- AGWA, Art Gallery of WA (Perth)
- NGA, National Gallery of Aus (Canberra)
- NGV, National Gallery of Vic (Melbourne)
- QAG, Qld Art Gallery (Brisbane)
- TWMA, TarraWarra Museum of Art (Healesville)
- UQld, University of Qld portrait collection (Brisbane)

1940–1959	1960–1979	1980–1999	2000–2011
Paintings while resident in Australia
1945 The Wasteland II (AGNSW); 1945 Keswick Siding (AGNSW); 1946 Holiday Resort (AGSA); "Kapunda Mines". news.com.au. 20 September 2012.	1960 The Stilt Race (AGNSW); "Rushcutters Bay Baths". The Australian. 1961.; 1962 Cahill Expressway; 1963 Surfers, Bondi		
Paintings while resident in Italy
	1966 Control Tower (AGSA); "Morning practice, Baia". The Australian. 1969.; 1973 The Traveller (QAG); 1973 Truck and trailer approaching a city (AGNSW); 1976 Corrugated Gioconda; 1977 The Dome (TWMA); "Guiding Spheres". The Australian. 1979.; 1979 Guiding Spheres II (Homage to Cézanne)	"Night Stop, Bombay". The Australian. 1981.; 1984 The Observer II; "Art Gallery in Shopping Arcade". The Australian. 1985.; 1992 The Oil Drums; 1997 Level Crossing; "Playground at Mondragone". The Australian. 1998.	"The Cable Coils". The Australian. 2001.; "On the Periphery". The Australian. 2003.; 2004 The Cleaners; "Drive-in cinema". The Australian. 2004.; "Leaving L.A." The Australian. 2007.; "The wooden fence, St Kilda". The Australian. 2009.; "Labyrinth – Smart's final work". The Australian. 2011. Archived from the original on 20 September 2012.
Portraits
		1980 David Malouf (AGWA); 1984 Germaine Greer; 1992 Clive James (AGNSW); 1995 Margaret Olley	"Bruce Beresford". The Australian. 2009. Archived from the original on 29 September 2012.
		Self portraits	Portraits by others
		1985 (Aged 64); 1993 (Aged 72) (UQld)	Churcher, Peter (2004). "Jeffrey Smart". smh.com.au. Archived from the original on 24 September 2015.; n.d. Jeffrey Smart by unknown

== Books ==
- Quartermaine, Peter (1983). Jeffrey Smart. South Yarra, Victoria: Gryphon Books. ISBN 0-908131-29-1. Contains a catalogue of 799 works produced by Smart in the period 1939–1982.
- McDonald, John (1990). Jeffrey Smart : Paintings of the '70s and '80s. Sydney: Craftsman House.
- Capon, Edmund; Pearce, Barry; Quartermaine, Peter (1999). Jeffrey Smart retrospective (in conjunction with the "Jeffrey Smart Retrospective Exhibition"). Art Gallery of New South Wales. ISBN 0-7313-8984-0.
- Pearce, Barry (2005). Jeffrey Smart. Beagle Press. ISBN 0-947349-46-4.
- Allen, Christopher (2008). Jeffrey Smart – Unpublished Paintings 1940–2007. Australian Galleries. ISBN 978-0-9751245-9-8.
- Pearce, Barry (2011). Jeffrey Smart. Beagle Press. ISBN 978-0-646-55361-0.
- Pearce, Barry (2012). Master of Stillness: Jeffrey Smart Paintings 1940–2011. Wakefield Press. ISBN 978-1-74305-123-8.
- Jeffrey Smart. Canberra, ACT: National Gallery of Australia. 2021. ISBN 978-0-642-33495-4. OCLC 1275391780.

== Documentaries ==
Smart's work and life have been the subject of several documentaries, the most recent, titled Master of Stillness, by filmmaker Catherine Hunter.

Master of Stillness records the creation of Labyrinth (2011), Smart's final work before retiring aged 91. Critic John McDonald calls it "a farewell picture – a last definitive statement that rules a line under a long and distinguished career". Curator, author and critic Barry Pearce, interviewed in the film, says of Labyrinth: "It is a kind of arrival at the painting he was always chasing, never satisfied, hoping the next one on the easel would be the elusive masterpiece, the one that said it all." Hunter visited Smart at his farmhouse in Tuscany and the painter took her to some of the places near Arezzo that have long inspired him – the concrete streetscapes and urban wastelands that define his vision. "If a good painting comes off, it has a stillness, it has a perfection, and that's as great as anything that I think a musician or a poet can do", said Smart.

== Selected exhibitions ==
The Jeffrey Smart Retrospective Exhibition
curator Edmund Capon : 27 August 1999 – 6 August 2000
- Art Gallery of New South Wales, 27 August 1999 – 31 October 1999
- Art Gallery of South Australia, 26 November 1999 – 6 February 2000
- Queensland Art Gallery, 10 March 2000 – 21 May 2000
- Heide Museum of Modern Art, 10 June 2000 – 6 August 2000

Master of Stillness
Jeffrey Smart paintings 1940–2011 : curator Barry Pearce
12 October 2012 – 14 December 2012
- Samstag Museum (Adelaide University City West campus) – paintings from the period 1951–2011
10 October 2012 – end February 2013
- Carrick Hill – paintings and drawings from the period 1940 – 1951 (the period Smart lived and worked in Adelaide).
21 December 2012 – 31 March 2013
- TarraWarra Museum of Art
Jeffrey Smart
co-curator Rebecca Edwards
- National Gallery of Australia 11 December 2021 to 15 May 2022

Many of Smart's paintings are in private collections. However, his works are also appear in a number of public collections, including:

- Carlo Boatti Collection, Milan, Italy
- De Beers Collection of Contemporary Art, London, UK
- Metropolitan Museum of Art, New York, USA
- Thyssen-Bornemisza Collection, Lugano, Switzerland
- Yale University, New Haven, USA
- Australian Art Galleries:
  - ACT: National Gallery of Australia
  - NSW: AGNSW, New England, Newcastle
  - SA: AGSA
  - WA: Art Gallery of Western Australia
  - Vic: Melbourne Arts Centre, Ballarat, Benella, Bendigo, Castlemaine, National Gallery of Victoria, TarraWarra, Warrnambool
  - NT: M&AGNT
  - Qld: QAG, Rockhampton
  - Tas: TasM&AG
- Australian Universities: ANU, Melbourne, Queensland, UniSA, Sydney
- Others:
  - Kerry Stokes Collection, Perth
  - National Trust, NSW
  - Parliament House, Canberra, ACT
  - Reserve Bank, Sydney, NSW
  - Royal Perth Hospital, WA
  - Wesfarmers Collection, Perth

== Sales of Smart's work ==
- Self Portrait at Papini's, 1984–1985 85 cm × 115 cm, Sold at world record price of A$1,260,000 on 27 August 2014.
- Autobahn in the Black Forest II, 1979–80, (oil and synthetic polymer paint on canvas, signed lower right: Jeffrey Smart, 100 × 65 cm), sold for a record A$1,020,000 at auction by Deutscher and Hackett in Melbourne on 20 April 2011.
- "Holiday 1971", (oil on canvas, signed lower right, Jeffrey Smart, inscribed verso, Holiday, 100 × 81 cm), sold at auction by Menzies for A$960,000 in Sydney on 24 June 2010.

A list of sales of 670 of Smart's work can be found at Australian Art Sales Digest.

== Honours and awards ==
Jeffrey Street in Hawthorn, South Australia, was named after Smart by his father who was involved in the sub-division of that area. In his memoir, Not Quite Straight, Smart comments that there is a bend in Jeffrey Street, and hence it, too, is "Not Quite Straight".

In 1951, Smart was awarded the Commonwealth Jubilee Art Prize. He was conferred the honorary title of Doctor of the University by the University of Sydney in 1999, and by the University of South Australia in 2011.

Smart was appointed an Officer of the Order of Australia in 2001 for his service to the visual arts, particularly through his distinctive portrayal of the urban landscape, and through the encouragement offered to young artists.

Jeffrey Smart was a patron and active supporter of the Tait Memorial Trust in London, a charity established by Isla Baring OAM, the daughter of Sir Frank Tait of JC Williamson's, to support young Australian performing artists in the UK.

Following his death, the University of South Australia announced on 21 June 2013 that the newest building at its City West campus, to be opened in 2014, would be named the "Jeffrey Smart Building".
