= Roberta Latow =

American art expert and erotic author

- Born: Muriel Roberta Latow; September 27, 1931; Springfield, Massachusetts
- Died: February 4, 2003 (aged 71); Oxford, England
- Occupations: Art expert, gallery owner, interior designer, erotic author

Muriel Roberta Latow (September 27, 1931 – February 4, 2003) was an American art expert, gallery owner, interior designer, and erotic author. She has been credited with giving Andy Warhol the original idea to paint Campbell's Soup Cans and the 200 One Dollar Bills, and her written works reflect her travels throughout Europe. Her later erotic fiction also reflected her knowledge and experience in the worlds of art.

== Biography ==
=== Early life and art career ===
Latow was born on September 27, 1931, in Springfield, Massachusetts. She had an early interest in art and moved to New York City to study interior design at Parsons School of Design.

She then worked as an interior designer in Manhattan, during which time she befriended numerous prominent abstract and pop culture artists of that era, including Mark Rothko and Andy Warhol. She actively participated in the "pop art scene" in the 1960s and became "famous for her generosity and the wild parties in her Mayfair apartment. The carpets were of fur, indoor trees reached to the high ceilings, from which canaries sang in cages and Roberta herself looked magnificent in extraordinary jewelry and eastern garments."

In 1960, she opened an art gallery in Manhattan, and opened it with encouragement from her friends but had to close it six years later because of competition from more established galleries.

According to Latow's Amazon.com biography, "She was a noted art expert and gallery owner and has been credited with giving Andy Warhol the original idea to paint Campbell's Soup Cans. While multiple people have taken that credit, many attribute the suggestion to Latow, including Ted Carey – a close friend of Warhol's during the late 1950s/early 1960s – who reports in Warhol's biography, Pop: The Genius of Andy Warhol: "the gallerist Muriel Latow came up with the idea for both the Soup Cans and Warhol's money paintings," and in compensation for that contribution, "on 23 November 1961, Warhol wrote Latow a cheque for $50 [more than $300 in 2010 terms]."

In the early 1970s, Latow moved to Europe. There, she visited and lived in various parts of the Mediterranean Sea. She particularly liked Greece, where she lived for many years and worked as an art dealer and interior decorator, remodelling homes and travelling the world to select antiquities for museums and art dealers.

=== Later life and writing career ===
In 1981, Latow later moved to London, where she wrote her first erotic novel Three Rivers, and became an international bestseller. She ultimately settled in the English countryside and wrote over 20 more novels. Many of her books' backgrounds reflect her travels in Europe.

=== Death ===
Latow died of cancer on February 4, 2003, in Oxford, England at the age of 71.

== Bibliography ==
Novels (Headline Book Publishing)

- Three Rivers (1981)
- Tidal Wave (1983)
- Soft Warm Rain (1986)
- This Stream of Dreams (1987)
- White Moon, Black Sea (1988)
- Cheyney Fox (1990)
- Cannonberry Chase (1991)
- Those Wicked Pleasures (1992)
- Her Hungry Heart (1993)
- Love Chooses (1993)
- A Rage to Live (1994)
- Objects of Desire (1995)
- Acts of Love (1995)
- Forbidden (1995)
- The Pleasure Seekers (1996)
- Secret Souls (1996)
- Only in the Night (1997)
- The Sweet Caress (1997)
- Her One Obsession (1998)
- Embrace Me (1999)
- Take Me Higher (1999)
- Body and Soul (2001)
- The Blue Lotus (2006)
