= 200 One Dollar Bills =

1962 painting by Andy Warhol

- Artist: Andy Warhol
- Year: 1962
- Medium: Silkscreen ink and pencil on canvas
- Movement: Pop Art
- Subject: United States one-dollar bill
- Dimensions: 203.8 cm × 234.3 cm (80.2 in × 92.2 in)

200 One Dollar Bills is a 1962 painting by American artist Andy Warhol. Executed in silkscreen ink and pencil on canvas, it depicts 200 images of a United States one-dollar bill arranged in a 20-by-10 grid. 200 One Dollar Bills is one of Warhol's largest works from his early Dollar Bill series. The painting is notable as one of Warhol's first works to employ silkscreen printing, a technique that became central to his practice. 200 One Dollar Bills sold for $43.8 million at auction in 2009.

== Background ==
During the 1950s, Andy Warhol gained prominence in New York as a commercial artist, particularly for his advertising work and illustrations of women's footwear. In 1961, Warhol began shifting from commercial illustration toward fine art, experimenting with paintings based on comic strips and advertisements. That year, he sold paintings directly to collectors including Robert Scull, Emily Tremaine, and Burton Tremaine, but struggled to secure gallery representation. Dealer Ivan Karp unsuccessfully approached several prominent New York galleries on his behalf, including Leo Castelli's, which declined to represent him in part because his work was considered too similar to that of Roy Lichtenstein.

Seeking a new subject, Warhol solicited suggestions from friends. Art curator Henry Geldzahler encouraged him to focus on ordinary, commercially available objects, while his art dealer Muriel Latow encouraged him to paint what he liked most; Warhol replied, "money." By early 1962, he was producing paintings of dollar bills alongside works depicting familiar consumer products, including Campbell's Soup Cans and Coca-Cola bottles. Warhol initially concentrated on one-dollar bills, but soon he was also making paintings of two-dollar bills. In June 1962, Stable Gallery director Eleanor Ward proposed an exhibition of Warhol's work in exchange for a painting of a two-dollar bill.

== Technique and production ==
The first dollar-bill works were made at Warhol's home studio at 1342 Lexington Avenue in New York in March–April 1962. Warhol initially produced pencil drawings and hand-painted representations of dollar bills, some incorporating watercolor. His works on paper included both individual, flattened bills and arrangements depicting bills as crumpled or rolled forms. When he began developing repeated dollar-bill compositions, however, he found that stencils and rubber stamps were impractical for reproducing the currency's detailed imagery. He instead made ink drawings of the front and back of a dollar bill on acetate and had them converted into hand-cut silkscreens at a commercial printing shop.

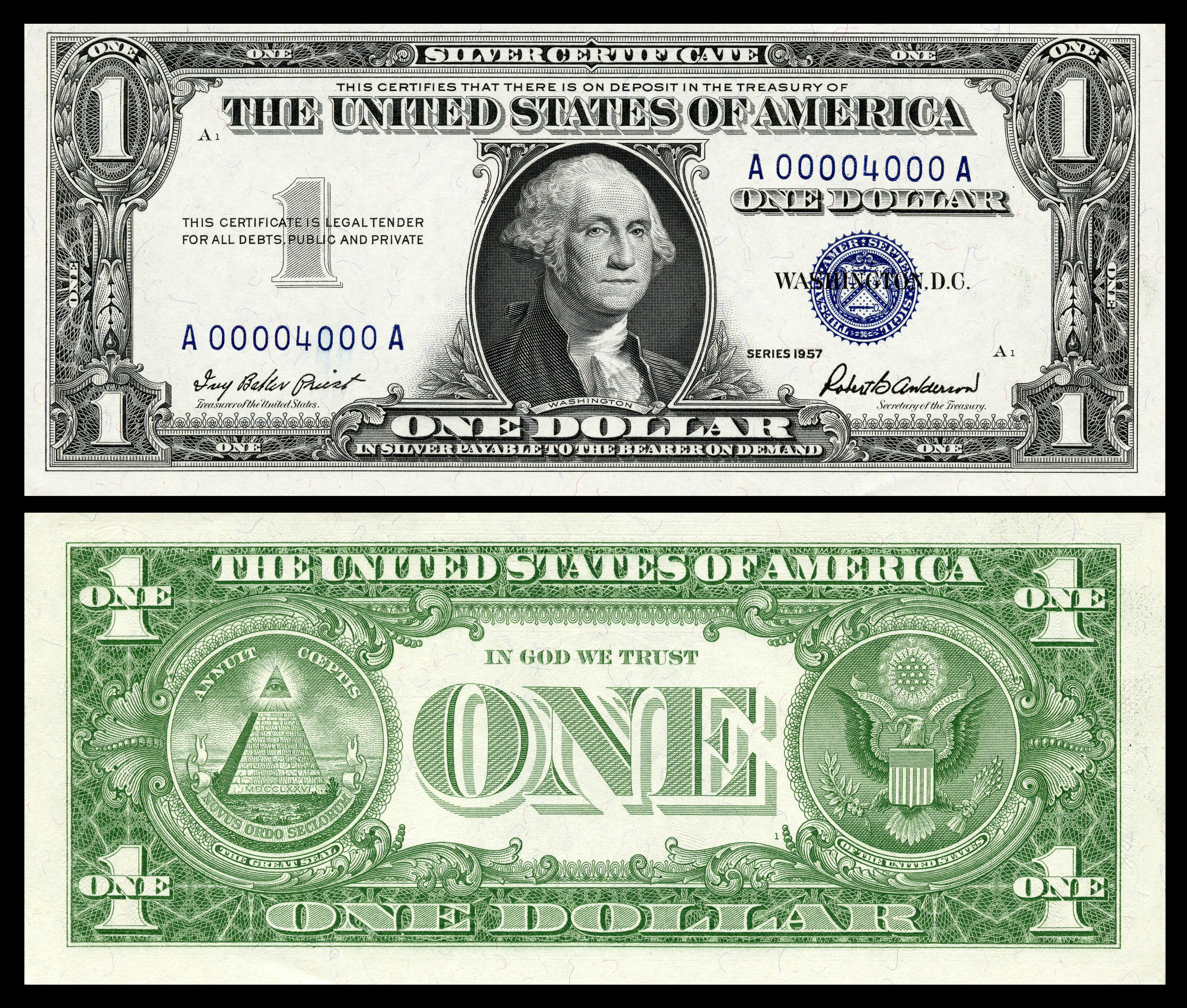
Warhol used a 1957 series U.S. one-dollar silver certificate as the subject of the painting

Silkscreen printing enabled Warhol to reproduce the same image repeatedly while reducing the emphasis on individual brushwork. The process involved transferring pigment through a fabric screen onto the canvas, with the open areas of the screen determining where the image was printed. Warhol's early screens were relatively small and closely corresponded to the dimensions of their source images, allowing him to operate the squeegee himself. The resulting images retain some evidence of the original drawing, while the printing process allowed Warhol to repeat the same image across the canvas in a regular grid.

The dollar-bill paintings were the first works in which Warhol employed the silkscreening technique, which would become central to his work. In 1977, Warhol said in an interview, "I started [silkscreening] when I was printing money. I had to draw it, and it came out looking too much like a drawing, so I thought wouldn't it be a great idea to have it printed. Somebody said you could just put it on silkscreens." Warhol expanded this approach to photographs of celebrities, newspaper images and other subjects.

By the end of April 1962, he had completed 200 One Dollar Bills, one of his largest and most ambitious money paintings of the period. The bills are depicted larger than actual size, and the blue Treasury Department seal on each bill appears to have required a separate silkscreen. The approximate date of the painting is supported by a photograph published in the May 11, 1962, issue of Time, in which part of the work is visible alongside the painting Big Campbell's Soup Can with Can Opener (Vegetable) (1962). Because the photograph would have been taken before the magazine's publication, it establishes that the painting existed by late April 1962.

== Description ==
Measuring approximately 80¼ × 92¼ inches (203.8 × 234.3 cm), 200 One Dollar Bills consists of 200 repeated images of the front of a one-dollar bill arranged in a grid of twenty rows of ten in black ink. There is a blue Treasury Department seal on each bill, which is distinctive to the 1957 series of the United States silver certificates.

The painting belongs to Warhol's early Dollar Bill series, which consists predominantly of relatively small paintings depicting individual dollar bills, some showing both the front and back. Only ten works in the series feature dollar bills in serial or grouped compositions. 200 One Dollar Bills and 192 One Dollar Bills (1962) are the two largest works in the series, with the former arranged horizontally and the latter vertically. The dollar remained a recurring motif in Warhol's work, appearing in later paintings such as Front and Back Dollar Bills (1962) and Dollar Sign (1981).

== Interpretation ==
The repetition of the dollar bill in 200 One Dollar Bills reflects Warhol's interest in mass production, commercial imagery, and consumer culture. Art critic David Bourdon observed that his "decision to present these forms as an ongoing, seemingly endless succession of units conveys the impression that quantity and conformity are of crucial importance. It didn't really matter whether he repeated the image twenty, one hundred, or two hundred times; the implication was always that the potential sum is infinite."

The dollar was also closely associated with Warhol's interest in money and business. In 1962, he told Time, "I just paint things I always thought were beautiful, things you use every day and never think about. I'm working on soups, and I've been doing some paintings of money. I just do it because I like it." In his 1975 book The Philosophy of Andy Warhol (From A to B & Back Again), he said, "During the hippie era people put down the idea of business—they'd say 'Money is bad' and 'Working is bad' but making money is art and working is art and good business is the best art." Elsewhere in the book, he wrote, "I like money on the wall. Say you are going to buy a $200,000 painting. I think you should take that money, tie it up, and hang it on the wall. Then when someone visited you the first thing they would see is the money on the wall."

As with Campbell's Soup Cans (1961–62), Warhol turned an ordinary commercial product into the subject of a fine art painting. In 1962, Marguerite Lamkin, writing for the London Express Service, asked Warhol what he was trying to say through his paintings. He replied, "I want to show the monotony in the way things are. You see these things every day and by painting them you realize how boring life really is."

== Exhibitions ==
200 One Dollar Bills was first exhibited at the Green Gallery in New York as part of a group exhibition from October to November 1962.

The painting was subsequently exhibited at the Institute of Contemporary Art in Philadelphia in 1965 in the first museum survey of Warhol's work. It was also included in exhibitions at the Institute of Contemporary Art in Boston in 1966, the Philadelphia Institute of Contemporary Art's Grids exhibition in 1972, and the Kunsthaus Zürich in 1978.

== Provenance ==
The painting was acquired for $1,200 from the Green Gallery show by Robert C. Scull, a New York taxi-fleet owner and prominent early collector of Pop art. It was subsequently in the collection of Pauline and Constantinos Karpidas for 23 years.

== Auction history ==
Following Scull's death, the painting was offered at Sotheby's in New York in November 1986 as part of the sale of contemporary art from his estate. It sold for $385,000, setting an auction record for Warhol at the time.

In November 2009, 200 One Dollar Bills was offered at Sotheby's in New York. It carried a presale estimate of $8 million to $12 million and sold for $43.8 million. At the time, the sale was the second-highest auction price for a work by Warhol, behind Green Car Crash (1963), which had sold for $71.7 million at Christie's in 2007. The sale was also the highest price achieved for a work at Sotheby's during its 2009 contemporary art auction season.

== See also ==
- 1962 in art
