= Luis Altieri =

Argentine visual artist and yogi

- Born: July 9, 1962 (age 64); Buenos Aires, Argentina
- Education: Asociación Estímulo de Bellas Artes
- Known for: Painting
- Movement: Abstract art

Luis Altieri (born July 9, 1962, in Buenos Aires) is an Argentine visual artist and yogi.

He studied at the Asociación Estímulo de Bellas Artes, Association Stimulus of Fine Arts (AEBA) in Buenos Aires, and later attended workshops led by Carlos Terribili, Carlos Tessarolo or Víctor Chab.

Altieri has participated in individual and collective exhibitions in Argentina and internationally, including at the Museo Eduardo Sívori in Buenos Aires (1996), the Florida Museum of Hispanic and Latin American Art in Miami (1997), Galería Borkas in Lima (1998), Casal de Cultura in Castelldefels (2002), Galería Grillo Arte in Punta del Este (2007–2012), and Kunst10Daagse in Bergen, the Netherlands (2002).
