= Coca-Cola (3) =

1962 painting by Andy Warhol

- Artist: Andy Warhol
- Year: 1962

Coca-Cola (3) is a painting by Andy Warhol. He completed the painting in 1962 as a wider series on Coca-Cola paintings, which also included Green Coca-Cola Bottles and Coca-Cola (4). The painting and others in the series are considered founding paintings of the pop art movement.

The painting is a 6-foot, black and white painting of a Coca-Cola bottle from the era.

== Ownership ==
In 2013, it was announced that the artwork would be put up for sale by the Mugrabi family, one of the largest collectors of Andy Warhol art. They had bought the painting two decades earlier, rumored to be from a billionaire collector. It was sold by the Mugrabi family for US$57.3 million at Christie's in 2013. The current owner of the painting is the Crystal Bridges Museum of American Art purchased 12 November 2013 for $57.3 million.

== Origin and painting ==
Warhol is best known for his famous Campbell's soup cans which was completed around the same time as Coca-Cola (3), between 1961 and 1962. Campbell's soup cans share the idea of the commercial culture of Warhol's Coca-Cola series. Warhol first began working with Coca-Cola bottles in the early 1950s when he would use images of Coke bottles from magazines to create collages. Warhol had a unique perspective and interest in Coke bottles. Warhol would state that “A Coke is a Coke, and no amount of money can get you a better Coke.”, alluding to the idea of economic and political equality. Some of his most famous works focus on mass-produced items, such as soup cans and Coke bottles, products that consistently remained the same quality, no matter how much you paid for it. Warhol was attracted to the idea that no matter who you are, you cannot purchase a better Coke or can of soup than the next person. Ultimately, Warhol admired the uniformity of items such as soup cans and Coke bottles.

Warhol's first Stable Show featured three known serial works of one hundred soup cans, one hundred dollar bills and one hundred Coke bottles. Between 1960 and 1960 Warhol created two versions of Coca-Cola (3). They were very similar to each other, but one featured a large dark splotch on the top right corner of the canvas. In his career, Warhol created 15 pieces associated with Coca-Cola.
