= Green Coca-Cola Bottles =

1962 painting by Andy Warhol

- Artist: Andy Warhol
- Year: 1962
- Medium: Acrylic, screenprint, and graphite pencil on canvas
- Dimensions: 210.2 cm × 145.1 cm (82.8 in × 57.1 in)
- Location: Whitney Museum of American Art; New York

Green Coca-Cola Bottles is a 1962 painting by American pop artist Andy Warhol that depicts one hundred and twelve almost identical Coca-Cola bottles.

Warhol produced at least four notable Coca-Cola paintings in the 1960s, with Green Coca-Cola Bottles being one of them. As part of the same series, Warhol created Coca-Cola (3), among others.

== Origin & painting ==
Warhol created several notable works in the early 1960s. This began with the famous Campbell's Soup Cans, which was completed between 1961 and early 1962. During this period, Warhol experimented with numerous common items, before creating the Green Coca-Cola Bottles painting in 1962.

In his early days as an artist, Warhol experimented with the Coca-Cola bottle beginning in the 1950s. The first known artwork of Warhol's was an ink-on-gouache drawing of a Coca-Cola bottle with a pair of legs. In the early 1960s, before the creation of his Campbell's Soup Cans, he used to tear Coca-Cola bottle images from magazines to use them in collages.

This inspiration and early use of the Coca-Cola bottle led him to create Green Coca-Cola Bottles in 1962.

Green Coca-Cola Bottles took a mainstream item and converted it into a piece of art. Warhol’s piece utilized a silkscreen technique, which mechanicalized some aspects of the painting but featured individualized "unevenness" across the painting. The painting engenders an optimistic message for the American public, described in Warhol’s own words: "What’s grand about this country is that America started the tradition where the richest consumers buy essentially the same thing as the poorest... you can know that the President drinks Coke, Liz Taylor drinks Coke, and, just think, you can drink Coke, too. A Coke is a Coke, and no amount of money can get you a better Coke."

== Early Coca-Cola painting series ==
Andy Warhol's relationship with Coca-Cola began early in his career when he created several Coca-Cola themed paintings. One such work was the creation of Green Coca-Cola Bottles, which was part of a wider series of four paintings. According to a friend of Warhol's, he began to focus on pop art paintings of Coca-Cola bottles and asked for critique on them. "It wasn't until he did the series of Coke bottles and got the feedback ... that he found his genre."

Warhol also famously created Coca-Cola (3), which sold in 2013 for $57.3 million at Christie's.

Throughout his career, he created 15 artworks related to Coca-Cola, according to the corporation.

== Exhibitions ==
Green Coca-Cola Bottles was exhibited at Coca-Cola's An American Icon At 100, celebrating the Coke bottle's 100th year since it was created. it is currently housed at the Whitney Museum of American Art, in New York.
