= Covers (The Smithereens album) =

Compilation album by The Smithereens
- Released: 25 May 2018
- Recorded: 1980–2008
- Genre: Rock
- Length: 72:19
- Label: Sunset Blvd Records

The Smithereens chronology
Especially for You - 30th Anniversary (2016)	Covers (2018)

Covers is a compilation album by The Smithereens, released in May 2018 by Sunset Blvd Records. It was originally released as a digital download on iTunes in May 2014. The album features 22 cover songs recorded by the band between 1980 and 2008. Most of the songs have previously been released as b-sides or on tribute albums and soundtracks.

== Background ==
Covers features songs that are collected from different sessions throughout the band's career. Guitarist Jim Babjak: “Whenever we had extra time in the studio we'd knock off covers for fun."

== Critical reception ==
Professional ratings
Review scores
Source	Rating
Illinois Entertainer	7/10 stars

Jeff Elbel of the Illinois Entertainer rated the album 7 stars out of 10, stating: "If these songs represent the Smithereens' schoolbooks, Covers is the thesis supporting the band's tenured status as professors and proclaimers of perfect power pop."

== Track listing ==
No.	Title	Writer(s)	Original release	Length
1.	"The Game of Love" (originally recorded by Wayne Fontana and the Mindbenders)	Clint Ballard Jr.	previously officially unreleased on CD	2:34
2.	"The Slider" (originally recorded by T. Rex)	Marc Bolan	Resurrection of the Warlock: A Tribute to Marc Bolan & T-Rex, 1995	3:04
3.	"Ruler of My Heart" (originally recorded by Irma Thomas)	Naomi Neville	B-side to "House We Used to Live In", 1988	3:02
4.	"Wooly Bully" (originally recorded by Sam the Sham and the Pharaohs)	Domingo Samudio	Encino Man (Original Motion Picture Soundtrack), 1992	3:04
5.	"Let's Talk About Us" (originally recorded by Jerry Lee Lewis)	Otis Blackwell	Brace Yourself! A Tribute to Otis Blackwell, 1994	3:20
6.	"Girl Don't Tell Me" (originally recorded by The Beach Boys)	Brian Wilson	Girls About Town EP, 1980	2:23
7.	"Up in Heaven" (originally recorded by The Clash)	Joe Strummer, Mick Jones, Paul Simonon, Topper Headon	The Sandinista! Project - A Tribute to The Clash, 2007	2:53
8.	"Time Won't Let Me" (originally recorded by The Outsiders)	Chet Kelley, Tom King	Non-album single, 1994 (from the Motion Picture Timecop)	3:46
9.	"Gloomy Sunday" (originally recorded by Hal Kemp and Billie Holiday)	Sam M. Lewis, Rezső Seress	God Save The Smithereens, 1999	3:40
10.	"Yer Blues" (originally recorded by The Beatles)	John Lennon, Paul McCartney	previously officially unreleased on CD	4:45
11.	"One After 909" (originally recorded by The Beatles)	Lennon, McCartney	B-side to "Top of the Pops", 1991	3:36
12.	"I Want to Tell You" (originally recorded by The Beatles)	George Harrison	Songs from the Material World: A Tribute to George Harrison, 2003	3:13
13.	"It Don't Come Easy" (originally recorded by Ringo Starr)	Richard Starkey	B-side to "Too Much Passion", 1992	3:07
14.	"Well...Alright (live)" (originally recorded by Buddy Holly)	Jerry Allison, Buddy Holly, Joe B. Mauldin, Norman Petty	Live in Concert! Greatest Hits and More, 2008	2:38
15.	"Rosie Won't You Please Come Home" (originally recorded by The Kinks)	Ray Davies	previously officially unreleased on CD	2:31
16.	"The World Keeps Going 'Round" (originally recorded by The Kinks)	Davies	B-side to "Too Much Passion", 1992	2:38
17.	"Downbound Train" (originally recorded by Bruce Springsteen)	Bruce Springsteen	One Step Up/Two Steps Back: The Songs of Bruce Springsteen, 1997	3:43
18.	"The Seeker" (originally recorded by The Who)	Pete Townshend	B-side to "Only a Memory", 1988	3:20
19.	"Somethin' Stupid" (originally recorded by Carson and Gaile, Frank Sinatra and Nancy Sinatra)	C. Carson Parks	B-side to "Get a Hold of My Heart", 1992	2:45
20.	"Lust For Life" (originally recorded by Iggy Pop)	David Bowie, Iggy Pop	B-side to "Only a Memory", 1988	5:08
21.	"The Stroll" (originally recorded by The Diamonds)	Nancy Lee, Clyde Otis	Fast Track to Nowhere: Songs from the Showtime original series Rebel Highway, 1994	3:00
22.	"Shakin' All Over" (originally recorded by Johnny Kidd & the Pirates)	Johnny Kidd, Guy Robinson	B-side to "Top of the Pops", 1991	4:06

Notes

- "The Game of Love", "Yer Blues", "Rosie Won't You Please Come Home" and "The Stroll" were recorded in 1993-1994 during sessions for A Date with The Smithereens. They were previously released on The Mega-Box Set, an unofficial 21-CD box set released in 2005 through Pat DiNizio's website in a limited edition of 500 copies. "The Stroll" was originally featured in Reform School Girl, an episode in the 1994 Showtime television series Rebel Highway.
- "Ruler of My Heart", "One After 909", "Somethin' Stupid" and "Lust For Life" were recorded in December 1987 during sessions for Green Thoughts.
- "Let's Talk About Us" was recorded in 1993 for Brace Yourself! A Tribute to Otis Blackwell.
- "Time Won't Let Me" was recorded in June 1994 for the film Timecop but not included on the soundtrack album.
- "I Want to Tell You" was recorded in 2002 for Songs from the Material World: A Tribute to George Harrison.
- "It Don't Come Easy", "The World Keeps Going 'Round" and "Shakin' All Over" were recorded spring 1991 during sessions for Blow Up.
- "Downbound Train" was recorded 24 January 1997 for One Step Up/Two Steps Back: The Songs of Bruce Springsteen.
- "The Seeker" was recorded spring 1987.

== Personnel ==
Adapted from the liner notes of Covers and Attack of The Smithereens, except where noted.

The Smithereens

- Pat DiNizio – lead and backing vocals, guitar, harmonica
- Jim Babjak – guitar, backing vocals, lead vocals on "Rosie Won't You Please Come Home" and "The World Keeps Going 'Round", co-lead vocal on "One After 909"
- Dennis Diken – drums, percussion, backing vocals
- Mike Mesaros – bass, backing vocals
- Severo "The Thrilla" Jornacion – bass on "Well...Alright"

Additional musicians

- Don Dixon – piano on "Ruler of My Heart"
- Michael Hamilton – keyboards on "Wooly Bully"
- Kenny Margolis – piano, backing vocals, hand claps on "Let's Talk About Us", piano on "One After 909" and "It Don't Come Easy"
- Ira Sebastian Elliott – hand claps on "Let's Talk About Us"
- Tony Visconti – backing vocals on "Let's Talk About Us"
- Jimmy Wood – harmonica on "Time Won't Let Me"
- Ron Fair – organ on "Time Won't Let Me"
- Dave Amels – piano on "I Want to Tell You"
- Bill Maryniak – organ on "Downbound Train"
- Marti Jones – co-lead vocal on "Somethin' Stupid"

Technical

- The Smithereens – production on "Wooly Bully", "Girl Don't Tell Me", "Time Won't Let Me", "It Don't Come Easy", "The World Keeps Going 'Round", "The Seeker" and "Shakin' All Over", compilation producer
- Don Dixon – production on "Ruler of My Heart", "One After 909", "Somethin' Stupid" and "Lust For Life"
- Ralph Sall – production on "Wooly Bully"
- Peter McCabe – production assistance on "Wooly Bully"
- Jon Tiven – production on "Let's Talk About Us"
- Tony Visconti – production on "Let's Talk About Us"
- Ron Fair – production on "Time Won't Let Me"
- Bennett Kaufman – production on "Time Won't Let Me"
- Don Fleming – production on "Gloomy Sunday"
- Michael Hamilton – production on "It Don't Come Easy" and "The World Keeps Going 'Round"
- Pat DiNizio – production on "Well...Alright"
- Jim Babjak – production on "Well...Alright"
- Dennis Diken – production on "Well...Alright"
- Kurt Reil – production on "Well...Alright"
- Mike Mesaros – production on "Downbound Train"
- Ed Stasium – production on "Shakin' All Over"
- Todd Sinclair – compilation supervisor
- Rebecca Baltutis – album design
- Bob Gramegna – photo restoration
