= The Lost Album (The Smithereens album) =

Studio album by the Smithereens
- Released: September 23, 2022
- Recorded: January–April 1993
- Studios: Crystal Sound Recording; RPM Studios (New York City)
- Genres: Rock; power pop
- Length: 41:57
- Label: Sunset Blvd Records
- Producer: The Smithereens

The Smithereens chronology
Covers (2018)	The Lost Album (2022)

Singles from The Lost Album
- 1. "Out of This World" Released: September 13, 2022

The Lost Album is the twelfth studio album by American rock band the Smithereens, released on September 23, 2022, by Sunset Blvd Records. It comprises tracks recorded in 1993 for an abandoned album, and is the band’s first album of previously unreleased original material in eleven years, since the release of 2011, released in 2011.

== Background ==
In 1993, the Smithereens were in between the end of their contract with Capitol Records and the beginning of their deal with RCA. There had been a management change at Capitol Records and a number of artists, including the Smithereens, were let go in summer 1993. Since the release of their last album, 1991's Blow Up, the band had written a batch of songs they wanted to record. So, in early 1993, they entered a New York recording studio and recorded two albums worth of songs. "It was the first time we went in with the intention of producing a full album by ourselves ... we paid for everything," drummer Dennis Diken said in 2022.

When the Smithereens eventually signed to RCA later in 1993, half of the songs were rerecorded for 1994's A Date with The Smithereens, and the remaining songs went into the band's archives. The twelve tracks on The Lost Album were rediscovered when the band went through their old piles of tapes and CDs for future archival releases. "We had all of the mixes on this material done back in 1993," Diken said. "So, all we really needed to do was to select the tracks, sequence them and master them." Bassist Mike Mesaros stated in the album liner notes that the album "remains only 80 percent finished and rough mixed." The original multitrack master tapes had been lost in a fire, which left the band with only copies of the rough mixes on digital audio tapes, "and they sounded fine," guitarist Jim Babjak said.

Lead singer Pat DiNizio rerecorded the tracks "A World Apart" and "Everyday World" for his 1997 solo album Songs and Sounds.

== Critical reception ==
Professional ratings
Review scores
Source	Rating
American Songwriter	4/5 stars
Goldmine	5/5 stars
New Noise Magazine	4/5 stars

The album received a positive reception from writers and critics. Many felt that it ranks among the band's best work. John Moore, writing for New Noise Magazine, described the album as "a dozen tight tracks of smart power pop with plenty of jangly guitars backing DiNizio's recognizably sunny vocals." He added, "You'd be hard pressed to distinguish songs like "Don’t Look Down" or "Love Runs Wild" from those off of Green Thoughts or 11." Andy Gray of the Tribune Chronicle found the album to be "full of catchy riffs and hooks that owe a debt to '60s influences like the Beatles without feeling stuck in the past," calling it a "great addition to the band's catalog."

Jason Green from The Arts STL website noted that the tracks didn't sound "labored over," writing, "Playing fast and loose just to get the songs down and letting things stay a little rough around the edges actually does the band favors." Rock and Roll Globe's Jim Allen wrote, "The Lost Album captures the Smithereens in transition but it feels like it fits right into their chronology."

On his website, writer Joel Gausten wrote that while the album has "plenty of treasures," it is also "a very mixed bag." He felt that the album needed an outside producer to add the necessary sheen, as some of the tracks merely "simmer when they deserve to scorch." He concluded that, ultimately, the album doesn't measure up to the rest of the Smithereens' discography. "If anything," he wrote, "it makes it clear that the strongest material the band created circa 1993 ended up on A Date with The Smithereens."

== Track listing ==
All tracks are written by Pat DiNizio, Jim Babjak, Mike Mesaros and Dennis Diken, except where noted.

No.	Title	Writer(s)	Length
1.	"Out of This World"		3:33
2.	"Dear Abby"		3:15
3.	"Don't Look Down"		2:57
4.	"A World Apart"	DiNizio	2:56
5.	"Stop Bringing Me Down"		5:43
6.	"Pretty Little Lies"		2:45
7.	"Monkey Man"	DiNizio, Babjak, Mesaros, Diken, Michael Hamilton	3:35
8.	"Everyday World"	DiNizio	3:02
9.	"Face the World with Pride"	DiNizio, Babjak	3:47
10.	"Love Runs Wild"		3:03
11.	"I'm Sexy"	Babjak	3:49
12.	"All Through the Night"		3:25

== Personnel ==
Adapted from the album liner notes.

The Smithereens

- Pat DiNizio – vocals, guitar
- Jim Babjak – guitar, percussion, backing vocals
- Mike Mesaros – bass, backing vocals
- Dennis Diken – drums, percussion, backing vocals

Additional musicians

- Uncredited – organ
- Uncredited – background vocal, "Don't Look Down"

Technical

- The Smithereens – producer
- Larry Buxbaum – engineer
- Chuck Cavanaugh – engineer
- Sean Coffey – assistant engineer
- Armando Guerriero – studio assistance
- Mike Hamilton – studio assistance
- Kevin Weremeychik – studio assistance
- John Mehrmann – studio assistance
- Greg Calbi – mastering
- Bob Gramegna – photo restoration
- Dave Amels – technical assistance
