= Blown to Smithereens: Best of The Smithereens =

Greatest hits album by The Smithereens
- Released: April 4, 1995
- Recorded: October 1982 – June 1994
- Genre: Rock
- Length: 61:00
- Label: Capitol Records
- Producer: Alan Betrock, Don Dixon, Ed Stasium, Ron Fair, Bennett Kaufman

The Smithereens chronology
A Date with The Smithereens (1994)	Blown to Smithereens: Best of The Smithereens (1995)	Attack of The Smithereens (1995)

Professional ratings
Review scores
Source	Rating
All Music	4.5/5 stars
Entertainment Weekly	B+

Blown to Smithereens: Best of The Smithereens is the first compilation album by The Smithereens, released April 4, 1995, by Capitol Records. It features the band's best-known songs and radio hits from 1983's Beauty and Sadness EP to the 1994 album, A Date with The Smithereens. The album also includes a cover of The Outsiders 1966 hit, "Time Won't Let Me", recorded for the film Timecop and released as a single in August 1994.

Blown to Smithereens has sold 188,000 copies, according to Nielsen SoundScan.

== Track listing ==
All tracks are written by Pat DiNizio, except "Time Won't Let Me" by Chet Kelley and Tom King.

No.	Title	Original release	Length
1.	"Beauty and Sadness"	Beauty and Sadness EP, 1983	3:28
2.	"Strangers When We Meet"	Especially for You, 1986	3:48
3.	"Blood and Roses"	Especially for You	3:36
4.	"In a Lonely Place"	Especially for You	4:11
5.	"Behind the Wall of Sleep"	Especially for You	3:24
6.	"Only a Memory"	Green Thoughts, 1988	3:44
7.	"House We Used to Live In"	Green Thoughts	4:02
8.	"Drown in My Own Tears"	Green Thoughts	3:10
9.	"A Girl Like You"	11, 1989	4:41
10.	"Blue Period"	11	2:55
11.	"Blues Before and After"	11	3:16
12.	"Yesterday Girl"	11	3:27
13.	"Top of the Pops"	Blow Up, 1991	4:32
14.	"Too Much Passion"	Blow Up	4:31
15.	"Miles from Nowhere"	A Date with The Smithereens, 1994	4:21
16.	"Time Won't Let Me" (from the Motion Picture Timecop)	Non-album single, 1994	3:45

== Personnel ==
Credits adapted from the album's liner notes.

The Smithereens

- Pat DiNizio – vocals, guitar
- Jim Babjak – guitar, backing vocals
- Mike Mesaros – bass, backing vocals
- Dennis Diken – drums, percussion, backing vocals

for track information see individual albums

"Time Won't Let Me" personnel

- Jimmy Wood – harmonica
- Ron Fair – organ, production
- Bennett Kaufman – production
- The Smithereens – production
- Michael C. Ross – engineering
- Tom Lord-Alge – mix
- George Marino – mastering (Sterling Sound, NYC)
- Recorded June 1994 at Record Plant, NYC and Music Grinder, Hollywood, CA

Production

- Wayne Watkins – project director
- Cheryl Pawelski – compilation producer, compiled by
- Brett Milano – liner notes
- Larry Walsh – mastering
- Tommy Steele – art direction
- Andy Engel – design
- Don Miller – cover photography
