= The Smithereens Play Tommy =

Studio album by The Smithereens
- Released: 5 May 2009
- Studio: House Of Vibes, Highland Park, New Jersey
- Genre: Rock
- Length: 41:21
- Label: E1 Music
- Producer: Jim Babjak, Dennis Diken, Pat DiNizio, Kurt Reil

The Smithereens chronology
B-Sides The Beatles (2008)	The Smithereens Play Tommy (2009)	2011 (2011)

The Smithereens Play Tommy is the tenth studio album by Carteret, New Jersey–based rock band The Smithereens, released on 5 May 2009 by E1 Music. The album features the band covering highlights from The Who's 1969 concept album, Tommy, creating an abridged version of the original story. The Smithereens edited the original album's 24 selections down to 13 songs, with a total running time of 41 minutes, compared to the original's 75 minutes.

It is The Smithereens' fourth cover album in a row, following two albums devoted entirely to Beatles songs (Meet The Smithereens! and B-Sides The Beatles) and an album of Christmas-themed songs (Christmas with The Smithereens).

The album cover is illustrated by William Stout, who also designed The Who's bootleg albums Who's Zoo and Tales from the Who.

== Critical reception ==
Professional ratings
Review scores
Source	Rating
Allmusic	3/5 stars
PopMatters	5/10 stars
Ultimate Guitar	8/10 stars

Allmusic's Mark Deming rated the album three stars out of five, saying that, "the feel of the album is pretty close to The Who's version," and that "guitarist Jim Babjak may lack Townshend's epic vision and sense of flourish, but he gets the crunchy bash of this music right, and drummer Dennis Diken and bassist Severo Jornacion find a way to pare down the style of the most manic rhythm section in rock history while achieving some approximation of their power and musical sense". Deming added that, although lead vocalist Pat DiNizio's "deep, moody tone" doesn't match Roger Daltrey's singing style, the songs suit "the dark, dramatic feel of DiNizio's instrument, and Babjak and Diken contribute lead vocals on a few tunes that demand something lighter". However, Deming concluded that the album is "little more than an oddity for Smithereens completists and Who fans obsessive enough to want every cover version of their favorite band's work. In short, this gets an A for effort but a C− for practical utility".

Will Layman of PopMatters rated the album 5 out of 10 and said "The Smithereens, packing dosed-up guitars that ring with power and full-throated singing, are up to the task of playing Tommy. The band, in short, sounds a whole lot like The Who. ... Loyal to the original to a fault, this record does too little to distinguish itself". There were a few exceptions, though, according to Layman, ""Acid Queen" is absolutely outstanding, with DiNizio sounding just like himself ... remaking the tune not only in the vocals but also in how the arrangement is layered in the brief bridge. And there are flashes in other songs".

In his review for Musoscribe, Bill Kopp said that The Smithereens' reinterpretation of Tommy "in fact improves on it in a number of ways. First, the ‘Reens strip away the album’s lesser tracks. ... Second, The Smithereens answer the question posed in [the album's] liner notes: "What if the Live at Leeds or Who's Next [era] Who had recorded a proper, all-out rock studio version of Tommy‘s best songs?" Kopp added that "The Smithereens Play Tommy isn’t meant to replace your well-worn copy of the Who album, and it shouldn’t. But this loving and energetic tribute does serve as an enjoyable rethinking of that set. The Smithereens are well suited to the challenge of covering an iconic work without losing their own identity in the process".

== Track listing ==
All songs written by Pete Townshend, except where noted.

No.	Title	Writer(s)	Length
1.	"Overture"		3:30
2.	"It's a Boy"		1:33
3.	"Amazing Journey"		3:15
4.	"Sparks"		3:31
5.	"Eyesight to the Blind"	Sonny Boy Williamson II	2:10
6.	"Christmas"		3:23
7.	"Acid Queen"		3:29
8.	"Pinball Wizard"		3:02
9.	"Go to the Mirror"		3:31
10.	"Tommy Can You Hear Me?"		1:09
11.	"Sensation"		2:26
12.	"I'm Free"		2:31
13.	"We're Not Gonna Take It"/"See Me Feel Me"/"Listening to You"		7:48

== Personnel ==
The Smithereens

- Pat DiNizio – lead vocals, guitar, production
- Jim Babjak – guitar, harmony vocals, lead vocals on "Amazing Journey", "Christmas" and "Go to the Mirror", production
- Severo "The Thrilla from Manilla" Jornacion – bass
- Dennis Diken – drums, percussion, harmony vocals, lead vocals on "Pinball Wizard" and "Sensation", production

Technical

- Kurt Reil – production, engineering, mixing
- Arnold Mischkulnig – mastering
- William Stout – front and back cover illustration
- Paul Grosso – creative direction
- Andrew Kelley – art direction
