= B-Sides The Beatles =

Studio album by The Smithereens
- Released: September 2, 2008
- Recorded: House of Vibes, Highland Park, NJ
- Genre: Rock
- Length: 27:47
- Label: Koch
- Producer: Pat DiNizio, Jim Babjak, Dennis Diken, Kurt Reil

The Smithereens chronology
Christmas with The Smithereens (2007)	B-Sides The Beatles (2008)	The Smithereens Play Tommy (2009)

Professional ratings
Review scores
Source	Rating
AllMusic	3/5 stars

B-Sides The Beatles is the ninth studio album by The Smithereens, released September 2, 2008 on Koch Records. The album features the band covering Beatles B-sides released in America in 1964 and early 1965.

== Background ==
B-Sides The Beatles is the Smithereens' second album to entirely comprise Beatles covers, following their 2007 release, Meet The Smithereens!, which was a song-by-song re-creation of The Beatles' 1964 debut American album, Meet The Beatles!. Smithereens co-producer and engineer Kurt Reil explained: "The project started while we were making demos in preparation for the next new original Smithereens album. As the band warmed up on obscure Beatles B-sides they used to play in clubs, we soon realized there was some unfinished Beatles business for The Smithereens, especially in light of the success of Meet The Smithereens!, and the idea for a follow-up was born."

The initial recording sessions for B-Sides The Beatles took place at the same time as the band were recording the Live in Concert! Greatest Hits and More album at The Court Tavern in New Brunswick, New Jersey between January 30 - February 2, 2008. Since The Beatles' early recordings were made between tours in limited time, The Smithereens, according to Reil, "wanted to capture that urgency in their own way". The band recorded the basic tracks for B-Sides The Beatles in Reil's nearby studio during the afternoon, "then I’d pack up my computer and head off down the street to The Court Tavern", said Reil. "I’d hook up to our setup there and record the evening’s show. We did this for four days, bouncing back and forth between the studio and club". Once Reil had completed editing and mixing the live album, the band continued work on B-Sides The Beatles, first adding vocals. Because lead singer Pat DiNizio’s voice was much lower than the Beatles' voices, the keys had to be adjusted, "but that helped us in that it instantly put the songs into a Smithereens context", Reil explained.

Andy White, who in 1962 played drums on The Beatles' original version of "P.S. I Love You", reprises his role for The Smithereens' version on B-Sides The Beatles.

== Album cover ==
The album cover was created by Jack Davis, one of the founding cartoonists for Mad magazine. Drummer Dennis Diken wrote in the album's liner notes: "MAD's influence on The Smithereens as a group and individuals cannot be overstated. It exposed the follies of our society and showed them for what they were: hypocritical, inane, petty ... and, through the pens of the ingenious writers and artists, hilarious! Our world could be tolerated much easier when we learned to laugh, especially at ourselves. ... I can't begin to count how many kernels of knowledge about books, movies, politics, colloquialisms and social attitudes were zapped into our psyches by MAD".

== Track listing ==
All songs written by John Lennon and Paul McCartney, except where noted.

No.	Title	Writer(s)	Length
1.	"Thank You Girl"		2:03
2.	"There's a Place"		1:57
3.	"I'll Get You"		2:08
4.	"You Can't Do That"		2:37
5.	"Ask Me Why"		2:27
6.	"Cry for a Shadow"	George Harrison, Lennon	2:26
7.	"P.S. I Love You"		2:10
8.	"I'm Happy Just to Dance with You"		1:57
9.	"If I Fell"		2:19
10.	"Slow Down"	Larry Williams	3:00
11.	"I Don't Want to Spoil the Party"		2:39
12.	"Some Other Guy"	Jerry Leiber, Mike Stoller, Richard Barrett	2:04

== Personnel ==
Credits adapted from the album's liner notes.

The Smithereens

- Pat DiNizio – vocals, guitar, harmonica, production
- Jim Babjak – guitar, vocals (lead vocal on "I'm Happy Just to Dance with You" and "Some Other Guy"), production
- Dennis Diken – drums, percussion, vocals (lead vocal on "Slow Down"), production, liner notes
- Severo "The Thrilla From Manilla" Jornacion – bass

Additional personnel

- Andy White – drums on "P.S. I Love You"
- Kurt Reil – piano on "Slow Down", production, engineering, mixing, liner notes
- Greg Calbi – mastering
- Jack Davis – CD front cover sleeve painting, artwork
- Andrew Kelley – art direction, design
- Bruce Spizer – liner notes
- Tommy Frangione – liner notes
