= Live (The Smithereens EP) =

EP (live) by The Smithereens
- Released: January 1988
- Recorded: October 1986
- Venue: The Ritz, New York City
- Genre: Rock
- Length: 24:39
- Label: Restless Records

The Smithereens chronology
Especially for You (1986)	Live (1988)	Green Thoughts (1988)

Professional ratings
Review scores
Source	Rating
AllMusic	3/5 stars
The Rolling Stone Album Guide	3/5 stars

Live is a live EP by the Smithereens, released in 1988 by Restless Records. It was the first release in the Restless Performance Series, which was initiated in January 1988, releasing CD-only live recordings. The EP contains six songs from a show recorded in October 1986 for MTV's "Live from The Ritz" concert series.

The EP was reissued for digital download in September 2011 as New York City 1986 with the same track listing.

== Critical reception ==
Trouser Press wrote that "the six selections (a perfect cover of the Who’s "The Seeker" joins the group’s own tunes) [are] flawless, the performance crisp and exciting." AllMusic felt that the EP "preserves the band in top form, with Pat DiNizio's vocals boasting a tougher edge than he displays in the studio and Jim Babjak's guitar gaining some additional on-stage crunch." They commented that the EP is likely to be appreciated by fans only, but also shows why the Smithereens were "a potent live attraction."

== Track listing ==
All tracks are written by Pat DiNizio, except where noted.

No.	Title	Writer(s)	Length
1.	"Blood and Roses"		5:42
2.	"Behind the Wall of Sleep"		3:20
3.	"Beauty and Sadness"		4:12
4.	"Alone at Midnight"		3:56
5.	"Strangers When We Meet"		4:10
6.	"The Seeker"	Pete Townshend	3:19

== Personnel ==
The Smithereens

- Pat DiNizio – vocals, guitar
- Jim Babjak – guitar, vocals
- Dennis Diken – drums, vocals
- Mike Mesaros – bass, vocals

Technical

- Susan Myers – front cover photography
- Dennis Diken – liner notes (November 1987)
