= Girls About Town (EP) =

EP by The Smithereens
- Released: 31 October 1980
- Recorded: Chelsea Sound, NYC, 1980
- Genre: Rock
- Label: D-Tone Records
- Producer: The Smithereens

The Smithereens chronology
Girls About Town (1980)	Beauty and Sadness (1983)

Girls About Town is the debut EP by the American rock band The Smithereens. It was released on 31 October 1980 on the band's own D-Tone Records. The EP contains four songs with the word ‘girl‘ in the title, including "Girl Don't Tell Me," a song originally recorded by The Beach Boys.

The 7" EP has never been available in any other format, though two of its tracks were included on Smithereens compilation albums: the title track on Attack of The Smithereens and From Jersey It Came! The Smithereens Anthology; and "Girl Don't Tell Me" on Covers.

== Background ==
“We had a bunch of songs with ‘girl’ in the title, and "Girls About Town" was the song that everyone thought was our best live song. It was the song that we thought, at the time, had the most commercial potential, so we called the EP Girls About Town and to round it off, we made it an EP that featured the word ‘girl’ in all four songs.” -Pat DiNizio

== Track listing ==
All songs written by Pat DiNizio, except "Girl Don't Tell Me" by Brian Wilson.

1. "Girls About Town"
2. "Girl Don't Tell Me"
3. "Got Me a Girl"
4. "Girls Are Like That"

== Personnel ==
Adapted from the EP's liner notes.

The Smithereens

- Pat DiNizio – vocals, guitar
- Jim Babjak – guitar
- Dennis Diken – drums, vocals
- Mike Mesaros – bass

Additional personnel

- Alan Varner – mixing
- Justine Strait – art
