= 2011 (album) =

Studio album by The Smithereens
- Released: April 5, 2011
- Recorded: October 2010, Fidelitorium Recordings, Kernersville, North Carolina, December 2010 – January 2011, Scotch Plains, New Jersey
- Genre: Rock
- Length: 46:46
- Label: eOne Music
- Producer: Don Dixon

The Smithereens chronology
| The Smithereens Play Tommy (2009) | 2011 (2011) | The Smithereens Play The Beatles Washington, D.C. February 11, 1964 Concert (2014) |

2011 is the eleventh studio album by American rock band The Smithereens, released on April 5, 2011, by eOne Music.

It was their first release of all-new original material since 1999's God Save The Smithereens, followed by an eight-year recording break and the release of four cover-song albums between 2007 and 2009. The sleeve cover was inspired by the cover for the band's 1989 LP 11. The album's first single was "Sorry", followed by "One Look at You".

== Background ==
The Smithereens released four cover-song albums between 2007 and 2009: two devoted to Beatles songs, one Christmas album, and a treatment of The Who's Tommy. "Our record company E1 liked the idea of us doing cover records so they kept giving us budgets to do them", drummer Dennis Diken explained. But what the band really wanted to do was to record a new studio album of original material, according to lead singer Pat DiNizio. "The label, though, figured there was a built in market for tribute albums", he said, "and they’re not wrong about that, so I came up with the idea that, since the 40th anniversary of Tommy was coming up in 2009, we should say something – let’s have the Smithereens cover Tommy. The record label went nuts over it, green lighted it immediately." Not all band members, though, were all on board for yet another cover album, so when DiNizio delivered the bad news to E1 "they asked what “will it take for you to do Tommy?" And I said, "If you finance and release a brand new Smithereens original album we’ll do it," and they (to my amazement) went for it. We gave them Tommy, and we created Smithereens 2011".

The band demoed songs and ideas at a rehearsal studio in New York City. "Pat came in armed with a briefcase filled with his four track cassette machine, and a stack of cassettes", Diken said. "We went to town. Laid down some grooves. We wrote some separately and together". The band reunited with producer Don Dixon, who had produced three of their earlier albums – it had been 16 years since they last worked together on the 1994 album, A Date with The Smithereens. "We worked like we did on the first records", Diken said, "We knew we only had a certain number of days to cut tracks, because the studio was only available to us for a finite amount of time. But we’ve always liked to work quickly. I think it brings out the best in us". The basic tracks were recorded at engineer Mitch Easter's Fidelitorium studio in North Carolina in October 2010 and the overdubs in Pat DiNizio's living room in New Jersey between December 2010 and January 2011. Guitarist Jim Babjak: "I would come in at night and play through an amp simulator that Don Dixon had made himself. Pat's mom was sleeping in the next room, so I only heard myself through headphones". Mixing and mastering was completed in February 2011.

The album title, 2011, is a nod to longtime followers of the band: referring to the 1989 album 11, and at the same time grounding the album in the present moment, according to music journalist Tris McCall, writing for NJ.com. "The "11" in "2011" is even printed with the same big, bold red numerals that decorated the front of [11]", McCall wrote.

== Critical reception ==
Professional ratings
Review scores
| Source | Rating |
|---|---|
| AllMusic | 4/5 stars |
| Rolling Stone | 3/5 stars |
| Goldmine | 4/5 stars |
| American Songwriter | 3.5/5 stars |
| Sonar | 4/5 stars |

AllMusic's Mark Deming called it "a return to form", and with Don Dixon having produced the band's "two best albums", 1986's Especially for You and 1988's Green Thoughts, Deming stated that "the sound of the album recalls the dramatic guitar-powered pop of the Smithereens' glory days". Though most of the songs, according to Deming, "don't come off as classics like "Only a Memory" or "Blood and Roses"," the band "haven't forgotten how to come up with a song that's hooky and atmospheric at the same time". John Borack of Goldmine magazine rated the album 4 stars out of 5, calling it "a refreshing, wholly satisfying blast of classic Smithereens songcraft and melodicism" that sounded like a return to The Smithereens’ best albums of the 1980s.

Hal Horowitz, writing for American Songwriter, gave the album 3½ out of 5 stars, calling it "a true return to form". He felt that the songs are "timeless", some are "powerful and memorable", and others have "sing-along choruses [that] stick in your brain after the first spin". Horowitz added: "If this album appeared in the late ’80s, it would have been hailed as one of the band’s finest efforts. In 2011 it’s merely the comeback of the year". In a less enthusiastic review, Will Hermes of Rolling Stone rated the album 3 stars out of 5, saying that the band "still crunch harder than most of the power-pop acts they get filed alongside", but felt that the songs were not memorable.

== Track listing ==
All tracks are written by The Smithereens.

| No. | Title | Length |
|---|---|---|
| 1. | "Sorry" | 3:36 |
| 2. | "One Look at You" | 3:44 |
| 3. | "A World of Our Own" | 4:42 |
| 4. | "Keep on Running" | 3:45 |
| 5. | "Rings on Her Fingers" | 3:00 |
| 6. | "As Long as You Are Near Me" | 3:14 |
| 7. | "Bring Back the One I Love" | 3:39 |
| 8. | "Nobody Lives Forever" | 2:25 |
| 9. | "Goodnight Goodbye" | 4:38 |
| 10. | "All the Same" | 3:22 |
| 11. | "Viennese Hangover" | 3:15 |
| 12. | "Turn It Around" | 3:59 |
| 13. | "What Went Wrong" | 3:34 |

== Personnel ==
The Smithereens

- Jim Babjak – guitar, vocals
- Dennis Diken – drums, vocals, percussion
- Pat DiNizio – vocals, guitar
- Severo "The Thrilla" Jornacion – bass, vocals

Additional personnel

- Derrick Anderson – "The Fifth Smithereen"
- Greg Calbi – mastering engineer
- Don Dixon – producer, recording engineer, mixing engineer, liner notes
- Mitch Easter – recording engineer
- Len Fico – management
- Mary Frank – photographs
- John "JK" Kennedy – tour manager, live sound mixer
- Jeff Miller – booking agent
- Todd Sinclair – CD cover design
- Paul J. Smith – road crew
- Chris M. Junior – liner notes
