= Christmas with The Smithereens =

Studio album by The Smithereens
- Released: October 9, 2007
- Recorded: House of Vibes, Highland Park, NJ; Nun Bett-R Studio, Wood-Ridge, NJ
- Genre: Rock
- Length: 37:03
- Label: Koch
- Producer: Pat DiNizio, Jim Babjak, Dennis Diken, Kurt Reil

The Smithereens chronology
| Meet The Smithereens! (2007) | Christmas with The Smithereens (2007) | B-Sides The Beatles (2008) |

Christmas with The Smithereens is the eighth studio album by The Smithereens, released 9 October 2007 by Koch Records. The album features the band covering nine Christmas-themed songs along with three originals.

== Critical reception ==
Professional ratings
Review scores
| Source | Rating |
|---|---|
| AllMusic | 3.5/5 stars |
| Contactmusic.com | 3.5/5 stars |

AllMusic's Mark Deming rated the album 3½ stars out of 5 and said that "as rock & roll Christmas albums go, this is good fun and admirably eclectic." He added that the album "is more thoughtful and intriguing than the average tossed-together holiday offering, and the best moments are a clear reminder of what makes this band worthwhile."

Mike Rea of Contactmusic.com also rated the album 3½ stars out of 5, saying that it sounded like "an entirely Smithereens album", with the songs sounding like originals, "a hark back to the days when bands would make and release Christmas albums and songs without any trace of irony". He felt that the three Smithereens' originals "fit in perfectly".

Zach Freeman of the Blogger News Network gave the album a B+, stating: "Christmas with The Smithereens is more than a Christmas-time cover album. This quartet does an impressive job of channeling the spirt [sic] of 1960s rock, and solidly interpreting each memorable tune." Freeman added that the band's originals "add a nice twist to an otherwise familiar record, and are written with such '60s-savviness that without prior knowledge it would almost be difficult to decide which songs were covers and which were originals."

== Track listing ==
| No. | Title | Writer(s) | Original artist(s) | Length |
|---|---|---|---|---|
| 1. | "Waking Up on Christmas Morning" | Jim Babjak | The Smithereens | 3:53 |
| 2. | "Santa Bring My Baby Back (To Me)" | Claude Demetrius, Aaron Schroeder | Elvis Presley | 3:12 |
| 3. | "Merry Christmas, Baby" | Brian Wilson | The Beach Boys | 2:35 |
| 4. | "Rockin' Around the Christmas Tree" | Johnny Marks | Brenda Lee | 2:08 |
| 5. | "Christmas Time All Over the World" | Pat DiNizio, Babjak, Dennis Diken, Mike Mesaros | The Smithereens | 2:34 |
| 6. | "Christmas" | Pete Townshend | The Who | 3:28 |
| 7. | "'Twas the Night Before Christmas" | Clement Clarke Moore | Christmas poem | 2:18 |
| 8. | "Run Rudolph Run" | Marvin Brodie, Marks | Chuck Berry | 3:18 |
| 9. | "Merry Christmas (I Don't Want to Fight Tonight)" | Joey Ramone | Ramones | 2:54 |
| 10. | "Christmas (I Remember)" | DiNizio, Babjak, Diken | The Smithereens | 3:37 |
| 11. | "Auld Lang Syne" | Robert Burns, traditional | Folk song | 3:02 |
| 12. | "Christmas Time Is Here Again" | John Lennon, Paul McCartney, George Harrison, Richard Starkey | The Beatles | 4:04 |

== Personnel ==
Credits adapted from the album's liner notes.

The Smithereens

- Pat DiNizio – vocals, guitar, harmonica, production
- Jim Babjak – guitar, vocals (lead vocal on "Christmas"), bass on "Christmas Time Is Here Again", production
- Dennis Diken – drums, percussion, vocals (lead vocal on "Merry Christmas, Baby", "'Twas the Night Before Christmas" and "Christmas (I Remember)"), production
- Severo "The Thrilla" Jornacion – bass

Additional personnel

- Kurt Reil – additional guitar, vocals, percussion, production, recording, mixing
- Dave Amels – piano, chimes, Marxophone, electric piano, organ
- Chris Bolger – bass, baritone guitar, acoustic guitar on "Christmas (I Remember)"
- David Marks – guitar on "Christmas (I Remember)"
- Joe Lambert – mastering
- Paul Grosso – creative direction
- Andrew Kelley – art direction, package design
- Frankie Galasso – CD cover illustration, caricature art
