= God Save The Smithereens =

Studio album by The Smithereens
- Released: October 19, 1999
- Recorded: February–March and June 1999
- Studio: Magic Shop, New York City; Sear Sound, New York City
- Genre: Rock, power pop
- Length: 42:06
- Label: Velvel; Koch
- Producer: Don Fleming

The Smithereens chronology
A Date with The Smithereens (1994)	God Save The Smithereens (1999)	Meet The Smithereens! (2007)

God Save The Smithereens is the sixth studio album by The Smithereens, released on 19 October 1999 on Velvel/Koch Records. It is the final studio album of all new, original material. Produced by Don Fleming, it was originally intended to be a concept album based on the idea of the world ending as soon as the year 2000 started. It was the last studio album to feature bassist Mike Mesaros, who left the band in 2006, but returned ten years later for occasional live dates. "She's Got a Way" was released as a promo single.

A two-disc deluxe edition with rare demos and live recordings was released in February 2005 paired with frontman Pat DiNizio's debut solo album Songs and Sounds.

== Background ==
After the commercial failure of The Smithereens' previous studio album, 1994's A Date with The Smithereens, the band were dropped by their label RCA, but continued to play live while looking for a new record deal. In the meantime, frontman Pat DiNizio was offered a solo deal with Velvel Records, which issued his album Songs and Sounds in 1997. "I guess they thought perhaps it would be the next logical move from the Smithereens, and then if that got any critical reaction or did anything at all, probably a Smithereens deal was in the offing, I guess is the word", DiNizio told Billboard magazine in 1999. "Sure enough, they offered us a deal".

When The Smithereens convened to record their sixth full-length studio album in February 1999, it was originally envisioned as a concept album about the millennium and the end of the world titled Apocalypse 2000. The band wrote more than 20 songs to fit the album's original theme before abandoning it late in the process. "There were quite a few tunes that came in at the 11th hour that weren't necessarily part of the concept," Pat DiNizio told MTV in 1999. He realized after a while that the millennium-influenced project "had already begun to feel a bit dated and more than a tad gimmicky", so by the time the band entered the recording studio "we quickly and intuitively shifted gears". He added, "When faced with deciding between making a concept album and making an album with good solid songs, we opted for the latter." The album was produced by Don Fleming, who was brought in at the suggestion of Velvel.

However, Velvel was in financial trouble, and in early 1999 the label was acquired by Koch Records. According to vice president of Koch, Steve Wilkison, the label was already in the hunt for The Smithereens, "When Velvel was going through some problems in the spring, I'd heard there was a finished Smithereens record and that Velvel looked like it might go out of business. So I had contacted the band and their management and said, 'Look, I want this record at Koch.' And we were actually fairly far along the way in negotiating for this record when, coincidentally and out of the blue, the whole deal went down where we bought Velvel."

Among those early songs that made it onto the album are "The Last Good Time" and "The Age of Innocence," which find DiNizio "reflecting on society's tendency to put riches ahead of human values", according to MTV. "Try" is about "dealing with the fact that we're all getting older, that life is so tenuous, you don't know what's going to happen one day to the next", DiNizio said. With an emphasis on "the classic mid-60's Beach Boys vocal style", "All Revved Up" is about "the notion of a couple living too greedily and burning out "'cause the end is coming and it's coming fast"...", DiNizio wrote in the album's liner notes. Among the late additions to God Save The Smithereens was "She's Got a Way", a song for DiNizio's 5-year-old daughter, and "House at the End of the World", originally intended for a part-time "Kraftwerk-influenced" electronic duo called The V.I.P.s, featuring DiNizio and Carrie Akre of the band Goodness. When bassist Mike Mesaros heard a demo of the song, he insisted that The Smithereens record a full band version for God Save The Smithereens. "While the title might suggest a lyric connection to the original Apocalypse 2000 concept, there is none", said DiNizio.

While some songs on the album fall in the traditional Smithereens vein, others represent the band's "experimental tendencies", according to guitarist Jim Babjak. These include a cover version of "Gloomy Sunday", a song popularized by Billie Holiday, and "Try", with its jazz influenced trumpet solo courtesy of ex-Blood, Sweat & Tears trumpeter Lew Soloff. "On every album, there's always something experimental, but we went a little further this time," Babjak said. "Gloomy Sunday" is the first recorded cover version on a Smithereens studio album and DiNizio had originally intended to record the song for an aborted second solo album for Velvel. He ultimately brought the song to The Smithereens, "We started performing it live, and it quickly became a favorite, and we decided to record it for the album", DiNizio said. "It really fits in with this whole end-of-the-century, what-do-we-do type of mood that prevails on the record."

On past albums, DiNizio would write songs and record his own demos, which would then serve as templates for the rest of the band. However, on God Save The Smithereens, all four band members contributed to the songwriting process and are accordingly credited. Sonically, the band felt like they had gone further than ever before in capturing their sound on tape. Drummer Dennis Diken felt that the album offered a "real band vibe" and had "an organic sense about it", while Mike Mesaros said, "It has a warmth to it and it captures an element that my favorite records and my favorite bands have always had. It rocks and has balls and is raw and at the same time it’s beautiful and melodic".

== Critical reception ==
Professional ratings
Review scores
Source	Rating
Allmusic	3/5 stars
Encyclopedia of Popular Music	3/5 stars
The Daily Vault	C+

Allmusic's Stephen Thomas Erlewine rated the album three stars out of five and called it "a good journeyman record that plays up their strengths quite nicely". The album has "a little bit of everything" that the Smithereens usually do, said Erlewine, "jangly pop, doomy rock, melancholy ballads, crunching riffs". He felt that the album "may not be as immediate or memorable as their best albums from the late '80s, but there are no weak moments on the record. Every song is well-crafted and delivered with conviction".

In his review for The A.V. Club, Keith Phipps called it "a welcome return" and felt that the album wasn't a radical departure from the Smithereens' previous work, but that it may be their most varied album to date. Phipps wrote that while "She's Got A Way" and "The Last Good Time" start and close the album in "classic Smithereens fashion", God Save The Smithereens also features "welcome, smoothly incorporated variations on the formula, from the trumpet solo of "Try" to the light touch of "The Long Loneliness," to the inclusion of the Billie Holiday favorite "Gloomy Sunday."

Christopher Thelen of The Daily Vault rated it a C+ and said that unlike the band's earlier albums, which were "happy-go-lucky in their own quirky ways", God Save The Smithereens is "often a brooding album" that suggests that the Smithereens are growing up along with their audience.

== Reissue bonus tracks ==
"A World Apart" was originally written for A Date with The Smithereens, but ultimately found its way onto Pat DiNizio's solo album Songs and Sounds. This is a Smithereens studio version, "much superior to a demo, yet not quite a master", according to DiNizio's album liner notes. "This Is the Way the World Ends" and "King of the World" are full band demos with "live instruments and overdubbed vocals", originally considered for God Save The Smithereens. Gordon Lightfoot's "Sundown" is a Pat DiNizio solo acoustic home demo and was also considered for possible rerecording and inclusion on God Save The Smithereens.

"All Revved Up", a band demo, was written in an early Beach Boys style, described by DiNizio as "hyper-speed "Little Honda"-influenced surf beat". The version that ended up on the album is considerably slower and more polished. "On the Beach" is another DiNizio solo acoustic demo, with incomplete lyrics following the original album concept of the world ending in 2000. "House at the End of the World", according to DiNizio, is a "very well recorded and neatly arranged home demo" originally intended for his part-time project The V.I.P.s. The demo features DiNizio on keyboards, synthesizers, acoustic guitar and drum machines and Carrie Akre on lead vocals.

Most of the Songs and Sounds bonus tracks feature Pat DiNizio solo and acoustic, recorded live in Spain.

Note

There are no credits listed on the album cover for the Songs and Sounds bonus tracks.

== Track listing ==
All tracks are written by The Smithereens, except where noted.

No.	Title	Writer(s)	Length
1.	"She's Got A Way"	The Smithereens, Danny Tate	3:26
2.	"House at the End of the World"	The Smithereens, Carrie Akre	3:36
3.	"Everything Changes"		2:15
4.	"Flowers in the Blood"		3:38
5.	"The Long Loneliness"		1:40
6.	"Someday"		3:32
7.	"The Age of Innocence"		4:10
8.	"Gloomy Sunday"	Sam M. Lewis, Rezső Seress	3:42
9.	"I Believe"	The Smithereens, Tate	3:13
10.	"All Revved Up"		2:09
11.	"Even if I Never Get Back Home"		2:45
12.	"Try"		4:13
13.	"The Last Good Time"		3:27

== Deluxe edition ==
=== Disc One: "God Save The Smithereens" ===
All tracks are written by The Smithereens, except where noted.

No.	Title	Writer(s)	Length
1.	"She's Got A Way"	The Smithereens, Danny Tate	3:26
2.	"House at the End of the World"	The Smithereens, Carrie Akre	3:36
3.	"Everything Changes"		2:15
4.	"Flowers in the Blood"		3:38
5.	"The Long Loneliness"		1:40
6.	"Someday"		3:32
7.	"The Age of Innocence"		4:10
8.	"Gloomy Sunday"	Sam M. Lewis, Rezső Seress	3:42
9.	"I Believe"	The Smithereens, Tate	3:13
10.	"All Revved Up"		2:09
11.	"Even if I Never Get Back Home"		2:45
12.	"Try"		4:13
13.	"The Last Good Time"		3:27

Bonus tracks
No.	Title	Writer(s)	Length
14.	"A World Apart" (Unreleased demo)	Pat DiNizio	2:59
15.	"This Is the Way the World Ends" (Unreleased demo)		3:44
16.	"King of the World" (Unreleased demo)		4:01
17.	"Sundown" (Unreleased demo)	Gordon Lightfoot	3:31
18.	"All Revved Up" (Unreleased demo)		2:46
19.	"On the Beach" (Unreleased demo)		1:48
20.	"House at the End of the World" (VIP's EP version)	The Smithereens, Akre	4:02
21.	"I Want to Tell You" (from George Harrison tribute CD Songs from the Material World: A Tribute to George Harrison)	George Harrison	3:12

=== Disc Two: "Pat DiNizio: Songs and Sounds" ===
All tracks are written by Pat DiNizio, except where noted.

No.	Title	Writer(s)	Length
1.	"Where I Am Going (Jennie's Song)"	Bernard Hermann	1:47
2.	"Nobody but Me"	DiNizio, Springa	2:42
3.	"124 MPH"		4:11
4.	"Running, Jumping, Standing Still"		4:05
5.	"Everyday World"		2:49
6.	"No Love Lost"		5:07
7.	"A World Apart"		3:35
8.	"Today It's You"		2:02
9.	"Liza"		3:17
10.	"Somewhere Down the Line"		2:51
11.	"You Should Know"	DiNizio, Danny Tate	3:42
12.	"I'd Rather Have the Blues"	Frank De Vol	7:53

Bonus tracks
No.	Title	Writer(s)	Length
13.	"A Girl Like You" (Live in Spain)		5:43
14.	"Yesterday Girl" (Live in Spain)		3:46
15.	"Behind the Wall of Sleep" (Live in Spain)		3:42
16.	"She's Got A Way" (Live in Spain)	The Smithereens, Tate	3:36
17.	"Blood and Roses" (Live in Spain)		4:13
18.	"Someday Boy" (Unreleased demo)		3:18
19.	"Afternoon Tea" (Unreleased demo)		4:05

== Personnel ==
The Smithereens

- Pat DiNizio – vocals, guitar, keyboards
- Jim Babjak – guitar, vocals
- Mike Mesaros – bass, vocals
- Dennis Diken – drums, vocals, percussion

Additional musicians

- Carrie Akre – vocals on "House at the End of the World"
- Lew Soloff – trumpet on "Try"
- Christopher Washburne – trombone on "The Age of Innocence"

Technical

- Don Fleming – producer
- John Agnello – engineer, mixing
- John Siket – engineer
- Bill Emmons – engineer, mixing on "The Age of Innocence"
- Juan Garcia – assistant engineer (Magic Shop)
- Todd Parker – assistant engineer (Sear Sound)
- Greg Calbi – mastering
- Michael Halsband – photography
- Philin Phlash – photography
- Jody Lee Thomas – photography
- Barbara Longo – CD package design

Reissue

- Bill Crowley – reissue producer
- Bob Frank – executive producer
- Drew Lavyne – remastering
- Jeff Chenault – reissue art director
- Rich Dombrowski – reissue design
