= Miles from Nowhere (disambiguation) =

"Miles from Nowhere" is a song by The Smithereens.

Miles from Nowhere may also refer to:

- Miles from Nowhere, novel by Nami Mun 2009
- Miles from Nowhere (1992 film), directed by Buzz Kulik starring Ricky Schroder and James Farentino
- Miles from Nowhere, working title of 2009 TV movie Chasing a Dream
- "Miles from Nowhere", a song by Cat Stevens from the 1970 album Tea for the Tillerman
