= 2011 (disambiguation) =

2011 was a common year starting on Saturday of the Gregorian calendar.

2011 may also refer to:

- 2011 (number)
- "2011" (album), by the Smithereens
- "2011" (song), a 2021 song by 5 Seconds of Summer
- 2011, a platform variant of the M1911 pistol
