= Dave Amels =

American musician and record producer

Dave Amels (born 1960) is an American musician and record producer who co-founded music technology companies Voce musical instruments and Bomb Factory. Both companies are known for detailed and realistic mathematical models of complex physical systems. Amels also plays organ in The Reigning Sound, a garage rock band out of Asheville, North Carolina.

Despite being an inventor of influential digital products, Dave, a garage rock fan and WFMU radio DJ, is famous for only using analog methods of recording. He designed recording studios and custom analog electronics for high end studios.

As a musician and record producer, Amels has worked with Ben E. King, Lenny Kravitz, Mary Weiss of 1960s girl group The Shangri-Las, and Dennis Diken of The Smithereens.

In 2002, Amels collaborated with Dennis Diken to form the band Husky Team. They released the album Christmas in Memphis on the Confidential Recording label.

Dave Amels relaunched the Cryptovision Records record label in 2009. Amels worked in A&R for the label in the 1980s.

== Discography ==
- Amphetamine Discharge
  - Parking – BOA/Roto Records – (RT014) – CD – 1996
- Andrew
  - Happy To Be Here – The Bus Stop Label (bus stop 1027) cd 2003
- Ben E. King
  - The Songs of Bruce Springsteen – Capitol – CD – 2000
  - One Step Up / Two Steps Back – The Songs of Bruce Springsteen – The Right Stuff (72438-59780-2-9) – CD – 1997
- Bingo Gazingo
  - Bingo Gazingo – WFMU (WFMU 001) – CD – 1998
- Buzzed Meg
  - Attack of the New Killer Surf Guitars – Beloved Recordings (Shanachie 5719) – CD – 1997
- Chris Butler
  - Museum of Me – Future Fossil Records ( ) – CD – 2002
- Chris Von Sneidern
  - Wood And Wire – Mod Lang ( ) – CD – 1998
- Dave Kleiner and Liz Pagan
  - Salesman – Bliss Records ( ) – CD – 2001
- Dennis Diken with Bell Sound ( )
  - Late Music – Cryptovision Records (CRC-3000) – CD – 2009
- Engineering Credits
  - What's That I Hear?: The Songs of Phil Ochs – Sliced Bread Records – CD – 1998
- Handsome Dick Manitoba (Richard Manitoba)
  - Ju-Ju Hand on Turban Renewal compilation – Norton Records (234) 2–12", – CD – 1994
- Health & Happiness Show
  - Christmas to Remember Velvel – CD – 1998
- Husky Team
  - Christmas in Memphis – Confidential Recordings (CON 3006) – CD – 2002
- Jill Sobule
  - Forever Dusty – R&D (Ladyslipper) – CD – 2000
- Jim Babjak
  - Music from Jim Babjak's Buzzed Meg, Vol. 1 – Tex Remy Music Group – CD – 2002
- Jon Graboff
  - For Christ's Sake! – Confidential Recordings (CON 3004) – CD – 2002
- Loser's Lounge
  - Sing Hollies in Reverse – Eggbert Records ( ) – CD – 1995
- Mary Weiss
  - Dangerous Game – Norton Records CED-323 – CD – 2007
- Michael Shelley
  - I Blame You – Bar None Records ( ) – CD – 2001
  - Too Many Movies (Japan Bonus Tracks) – Crown Japan – CD – 2001
  - Too Many Movies – Big Deal Records (9056–2) – CD – 1998
  - Half Empty – Big Deal Records (9038–2) – CD – 1997
- Reigning Sound
  - Love And Curses – In The Red – CD – 2009
  - Abdication...For Your Love – Scion AV – CD – 2011
  - Shattered – Merge Records – CD – 2014
- Richard X. Heyman
  - Cornerstone – Last Call Records ( ) – CD – 2002
  - Cornerstone – Permanent Press (PPCD 52707) – CD – 1998
  - Cornerstone – Turn Up Records (n/a) – CD – 1997
- Ruth Gerson
  - Wake to Echo – CD – 2003
- The Smithereens
  - Meet The Smithereens! – Koch Records (4204) – CD – 2007
  - Christmas with The Smithereens – Koch Records (4405) – CD – 2007
  - Songs from the Material World: A Tribute to George Harrison – Koch Records (8390) – CD – 2003
- Star City
  - Inside The Other Days – CD – 2001
- Television themes
  - Weird U.S. Theme – The History Channel – TV – 2004
- The A-Bones
  - I Don't Need No Job / "Wha Hey" – Norton Records – 7" – 1994
- The Anthony Wayne Sound
  - The dB's – Tribute: Stand-Ins For Decibels – The Paisley Pop Label (Pop CD 102778) – CD – 2006
- The Breetles
  - Pop Under the Surface Vol. 2 – Yesterday Girl Records (YES 002) – CD – 1998
- The Creatures of The Golden Dawn
  - The Creatures of The Golden Dawn – Collectables (CD 0698) – CD – 1997
- The Dictators
  - D.F.F.D. – Dictators Multimedia ( ) – CD/LP – 2001
- The Insomniacs
  - "Pop Cycle" – Estrus Records (ES103) – 10" – 1994
- The Insomniacs
  - "Time Ticks By" / "The World Disappears" – Umbrella Records (UM002) – 7", Estrus Records (ESD1219) – CD – 1992
- The Mod Fun
  - Past ...Forward – Get Hip Records (GH-1025) – CD – 1996
  - Dorothy's Dream – Cryptovision Records (CRL-1000) – 12" – 1986
- The Optic Nerve
  - Forever and a Day – Screaming Apple Records (SCALP 104) – CD – 1995
  - Lotta' Nerve – Get Hip Records (GH-1015) – CD – 1995
  - Leaving Yesterday Behind / "Kiss Her Goodbye" – Cryptovision Records (CR-810) – 7" – 1987
- The Parting Gifts
  - Strychnine Dandelion – In The Red – CD – 2010
- The Philistines Jr.
  - Analog Vs. Digital – Tarquin Records – CD – 2001
- The Stepford Husbands
  - We've Come A Long Way / "Come and Take a Ride in My Boat" – Get Hip Records – 7" – 1993
  - Building of Love For Sale / "Bag ManTick Tock" – Cryptovision Records (CR-320) – 7" – 1990
  - Seems Like Years / "Kwik Way" – Cryptovision Records (CR-310) – 7" – 1988
  - I'm Rode Out / "Seeing is Believing" – Cryptovision Records (CR-300) – 7" – 1985
  - Why Aren't You There / "Yeah" – Cryptovision Records (BR-1000-11-1) – 7" – 1984
- The Sultrees
  - Take Me As I Am / "Contrails" – Cryptovision Records (CR-1000) – 7" – 1990
- The Swingin' Neckbreakers
  - Shake Break! – Telstar (019) – CD – 1995
  - Struttin on Turban Renewal compilation – Norton (234) 2–12", – CD – 1994
  - Red Hot – Abus Dangereus CD w/ issue #35 – 1994
  - I'm in Love With Me / "Quit Your Belly Achin' Baby" – Telstar (015) – 7" – 1994
  - Live For Buzz – Telstar (012) 12", – CD – 1993
  - Little Pink Medicine / "Bama Lama Lama Loo" – Telstar (012) – 7" – 1993
  - Workin' & Jerkin' / "Good Good Lovin'" – Estrus Records (747) – 7" – 1993
- Various Artists Compilations
  - Please Don't Adjust Your Set... – Cryptovision Records (CRL-1100) – 12" – 1986
  - Declaration of Fuzz – Glitterhouse – 12" – 1985
