= Meet The Smithereens! =

Studio album by The Smithereens
- Released: January 16, 2007
- Recorded: November 2006
- Studio: House of Vibes, Highland Park, NJ
- Genre: Rock
- Length: 28:03
- Label: Koch
- Producer: Pat DiNizio, Jim Babjak, Dennis Diken, Kurt Reil

The Smithereens chronology
God Save The Smithereens (1999)	Meet The Smithereens! (2007)	Christmas with The Smithereens (2007)

Professional ratings
Review scores
Source	Rating
AllMusic	3/5 stars
Rolling Stone	3/5 stars

Meet The Smithereens! is the seventh studio album by Carteret, New Jersey-based rock band The Smithereens, released in stores on January 16, 2007. The album features the band covering The Beatles' 1964 American album, Meet the Beatles!

It is the first Smithereens album to feature Severo "The Thrilla" Jornacion, who replaced original bassist Mike Mesaros in 2006.

== Background ==
In 2006, The Smithereens hadn't released an album in seven years since 1999's God Save The Smithereens. "There was simply no demand from record companies for a new Smithereens album", lead singer Pat DiNizio explained. The band still performed live, and in May 2005 they were invited to perform at Abbey Road on the River, a Beatles music festival in Louisville, Kentucky. The band had often performed Beatles songs as encores and were asked to do a whole set of covers at the festival. During the set the audience called out for Smithereens songs and the band realized that there was some crossover between die-hard Beatles fans and Smithereens fans. Soon after, DiNizio began to receive e-mails from fans who had attended the concert suggesting the band record an album of Beatles songs. The band was intrigued and decided to record an album of all-Beatles material as a way to reintroduce The Smithereens to their old audience.

“I realized that to attempt to record songs from every phase of the Beatles’ career and have any sense of continuity would be almost impossible", DiNizio said. The idea of a song-by-song cover of Meet The Beatles! took shape when DiNizio came across an article in the October 2006 issue of American Heritage magazine titled "1964 - When a New Age Was Born". It talked about the Vietnam War, America dealing with the assassination of John F. Kennedy, the civil rights movement but also about Beatlemania. "I believe Meet the Beatles is historically the most important rock-and-roll album ever released in America", DiNizio said. "It just started a cultural revolution that hasn't stopped". DiNizio contacted Bob Frank, president at the band's last record label, Koch Records, and presented him the idea of "The Smithereens versus The Beatles". Frank loved the idea and signed the band to a new record deal. According to DiNizio, the band immersed themselves in 1964 ephemera in preparation for recording, with objects like magazines, posters and the bobbleheads that made the cover. With Kurt Reil of The Grip Weeds co-producing, the album was recorded in five days in November 2006 at The Grip Weeds' House of Vibes studio in Highland Park, New Jersey.

"It was really successful", DiNizio said of the album in 2013, "it broke download records on iTunes – and it put us on the front page of the New York Times leisure section on Sunday, so [Koch Records] let us do a Christmas album, another Beatles tribute and the live album".

== Track listing ==
All tracks are written by John Lennon and Paul McCartney, except where noted. See also: Lennon–McCartney.

No.	Title	Writer(s)	Length
1.	"I Want to Hold Your Hand"		2:29
2.	"I Saw Her Standing There"		3:00
3.	"This Boy"		2:33
4.	"It Won't Be Long"		2:16
5.	"All I've Got to Do"		2:06
6.	"All My Loving"		2:10
7.	"Don't Bother Me"	George Harrison	2:33
8.	"Little Child"		1:49
9.	"Till There Was You"	Meredith Willson	2:14
10.	"Hold Me Tight"		2:33
11.	"I Wanna Be Your Man"		2:07
12.	"Not a Second Time"		2:10

== Personnel ==
Credits adapted from the album's liner notes.

The Smithereens

- Pat DiNizio – vocals, guitar, production
- Jim Babjak – guitar, vocals (lead vocals on "Don't Bother Me"), production
- Severo "The Thrilla" Jornacion – bass
- Dennis Diken – drums, percussion, vocals (lead vocals on "I Wanna Be Your Man"), production, liner notes

Additional personnel

- John Hawken – piano on "Little Child" and "Not a Second Time"
- Dave Amels – organ on "I Wanna Be Your Man"
- Kurt Reil – vocals, production, recording, mixing
- Kristin Reil – percussion on "Don't Bother Me"
- Dennis Drake – mastering
- Paul Grosso – creative direction
- Andrew Kelley – art direction, package design
- Todd Sinclair – CD cover design
- Bruce Spizer – liner notes
- Dennis Mitchell – liner notes
- Lenny Kaye – liner notes
- Sid Bernstein – liner notes
- Andy Babiuk – liner notes
- Dave Connolly – liner notes
