= Christmas (song) =

Song by the Who

from the album Tommy
- Released: May 23, 1969
- Genre: Hard rock
- Length: 4:34
- Label: Polydor
- Songwriter: Pete Townshend
- Producer: Kit Lambert

"Christmas" is a song written by Pete Townshend and is the seventh song on the Who's rock opera Tommy. On the original LP, it opens the second side of the album.

== Lyrics ==
The song tells how on Christmas morning, Tommy's father is worried about Tommy's future, and soul. His future is jeopardized due to being deaf, dumb, and blind. The lyrics contrast religious themes such as Christmas and Jesus Christ with Tommy's ignorance of such matters. The rhetorical question, "How can he be saved from the eternal grave?" is asked about Tommy's condition and adds speculation as to the nature of original sin and eternal salvation. In the middle of the song, "Tommy can you hear me?" is repeated, with Tommy responding, "See me, feel me, touch me, heal me."

(Later, Tommy's life changes when he receives a pinball machine and eventually becomes the "Pinball Wizard".)

== Composition ==
According to the sheet music published at Musicnotes.com by Sony/ATV Music Publishing, the song is set in the time signature of common time. It is composed in the key of G Major with Roger Daltrey's vocal range spanning from G_{3} to A_{4}. The song makes repeated use of suspended fourth chords that resolve to triads. Some of the melodic material is similar to the horn section on Tommy's "Overture".

== Critical reception ==
"Christmas" was praised by critics. Richie Unterberger of AllMusic called it an "excellent song". Rolling Stone's Mac Randall said it was one of several "prime Pete Townshend songs" on the album. A review in Life by Albert Goldman considered it beautiful and highlighted the song's "croaking chorus". James Perone said it was "perhaps one of the best sleeper tracks of the collection."

== Cover versions ==
The Smithereens did a cover on their 2007 album Christmas with The Smithereens.

Leslie Odom Jr. did a cover on the deluxe edition of his album Simply Christmas.

== Personnel ==
The Who

- Roger Daltrey – lead vocals
- Pete Townshend – backing vocals, electric guitar
- John Entwistle – backing vocals, bass guitar
- Keith Moon – drums
