= A Date with The Smithereens =

Studio album by The Smithereens
- Released: April 26, 1994
- Recorded: 1993–1994
- Studio: Magic Shop, New York City
- Genre: Rock, alternative rock, hard rock
- Length: 48:28
- Label: RCA
- Producer: Don Dixon; The Smithereens; Lou Giordano

The Smithereens chronology
Blow Up (1991)	A Date with The Smithereens (1994)	God Save The Smithereens (1999)

Professional ratings
Review scores
Source	Rating
AllMusic	2/5 stars
Entertainment Weekly	B
Los Angeles Times	2.5/4 stars
Rolling Stone	4/5 stars

A Date with the Smithereens is the fifth album by the New Jersey rock band The Smithereens, released in 1994. It is seen as a stylistically consistent with the melodic pop sensibilities of their earliest albums, along with the more rock-driven sound and production of their most commercially successful releases.

== Details ==
Producer Butch Vig left the project prior to the recording of the album, which may have inspired some of the "bitterness" expressed in this album.

The album was originally planned to be released about a year before it actually was, but Capitol Records was near dropping The Smithereens. The reason for this was a change in leadership at the label. In the post-Nirvana climate of grunge music, the pop rock sound of their previous album Blow Up was considered old hat, despite the album including the band's second Top 40 hit single, "Too Much Passion". Butch Vig's departure from the project convinced Capitol's new leadership to drop The Smithereens from the label.

The Smithereens planned to start recording on the album in December 1992, but the recording was postponed to February 1993, because of the prioritization of The Smashing Pumpkins album Vig was working on. In July, Butch Vig gave up on the Smithereens, and shortly after, Capitol Records dropped them.

Only two weeks after The Smithereens were dropped by Capitol, they were signed to RCA Records. RCA wanted to establish a presence in the rock genre, and prioritized promotion of both the band and the album. The Smithereens decided to work with Don Dixon again, who had previously produced their first two albums.

== Artwork and title ==
The album title may be based on the 1959 album A Date with Elvis and the cover may be based on a picture of four thugs standing on a street in New York featured in a book Dennis Diken owned. The font used for the title may have been based on the sleeve of a soundtrack album called "The theme from Ben Casey." As another reference to older albums, the cover includes the RCA Victor logo with Nipper the dog on it and it also included a logo saying "Living Stereo." The album came out on cassette, CD, and a box set of four seven-inch vinyl records. On the cassette and CD covers, the background color is red, but on the cover of the box set of records, the background color is light blue.

== Reception ==
The album received mixed reviews. Rolling Stone gave it four stars, calling the band's sound "distinctive and accessible", and complimenting Pat DiNizio's songcraft, which now included more driving, electrified guitar, humor, and socially conscious lyrics than on previous efforts. Entertainment Weekly rated the album a B, noting that the melodic, "guitar-driven power pop" had moments of humor. The review from Allmusic was more negative, however: the reviewer felt that the songs were poorly written, the sound of the album was "tired" and "worn out", and that the good songs only made the rest of the record more "dispiriting", with a "weird undercurrent of bitterness". This opinion was shared by Trouser Press, who felt that the album was inconsistent, weighed down by negativity even when trying to express more poetic, pop sentiment. The Los Angeles Times gave the album 2½ stars out of 4, calling it a "solid, enjoyable effort". The reviewer felt that the band was "too rockin' and pop-savvy to make a bad album", but after 11 years as a recording band lacked "the expansiveness of style and imagination to make a great one".

The mixed reception was reflected in the album's sales, which were among the lowest in the band's catalog. The album entered the Billboard 200 at #133, and remained on the chart for only two weeks. The first lead single, "Miles From Nowhere," only reached #17 on the Mainstream Rock chart. RCA dropped them after that album, leaving them without a record label for the next five years.

== Track listing ==
Sources: Discogs, Allmusic, 45cat

All tracks are written by Pat DiNizio, except where noted.

No.	Title	Length
1.	"War for My Mind"	4:06
2.	"Everything I Have Is Blue"	4:27
3.	"Miles from Nowhere"	4:18
4.	"Afternoon Tea"	3:55
5.	"Point of No Return" (Babjak)	4:05
6.	"Sleep the Night Away"	4:16
7.	"Love is Gone" (Babjak)	3:40
8.	"Long Way Back Again"	4:06
9.	"Gotti"	4:51
10.	"Sick of Seattle"	3:03
11.	"Can't Go Home Anymore"	4:07
12.	"Life Is So Beautiful"	3:25

Box set vinyl edition: The box set vinyl edition of the album also contained the additional tracks "I'm Sexy", "Keep Me Running" (Demo) and "Everything I Have Is Blue" (Demo). The order of the tracks is slightly different, and the mixes and track timings differ -- sometimes quite significantly -- from the CD/cassette mixes.

== Personnel ==
Adapted from the album's liner notes.

The Smithereens

- Pat DiNizio – vocals, guitar, harmonica
- Jim Babjak – guitar, vocals
- Dennis Diken – drums, percussion, vocals
- Mike Mesaros – bass, vocals

With:

- Lou Reed – guitar solos on "Point of No Return" and "Long Way Back Again"

Technical

- Don Dixon – producer
- The Smithereens – producer, art direction
- Lou Giordano – associate producer, engineer
- Joe Warda – assistant engineer
- Mark Avnet – digital editing
- Greg Calbi – mastering
- Jackie Murphy – art direction
- Sean Smith – design
- Michael Halsband – photography

== Charts ==
Chart (1994)	Peak position
US Billboard 200	133

=== Singles ===
Song	US Mainstream Rock
"Miles from Nowhere"	17
