= Miles from Nowhere =

"Miles From Nowhere"

Single by The Smithereens

from the album A Date with The Smithereens
- Released: March 31, 1994
- Genre: Power pop, alternative rock
- Length: 4:32
- Label: RCA
- Songwriter(s): Pat DiNizio
- Producer(s): Don Dixon

The Smithereens singles chronology
"Too Much Passion" (1991)	"Miles From Nowhere" (1994)

"Miles From Nowhere" is a song by the American alternative rock group The Smithereens. It is the first single released in support of their fifth album A Date with The Smithereens.

== Formats and track listing ==
All songs written by Pat DiNizio, except where noted.

US CD single (RDJ-62820-2)

1. "Miles From Nowhere" – 4:18
2. "Keep Me Running (demo)" – 2:50
3. "Everything I Have Is Blue (demo)" – 4:19

== Charts ==
Chart (1994)	Peak position
US Mainstream Rock (Billboard)	17
