= The Smithereens =

American rock band

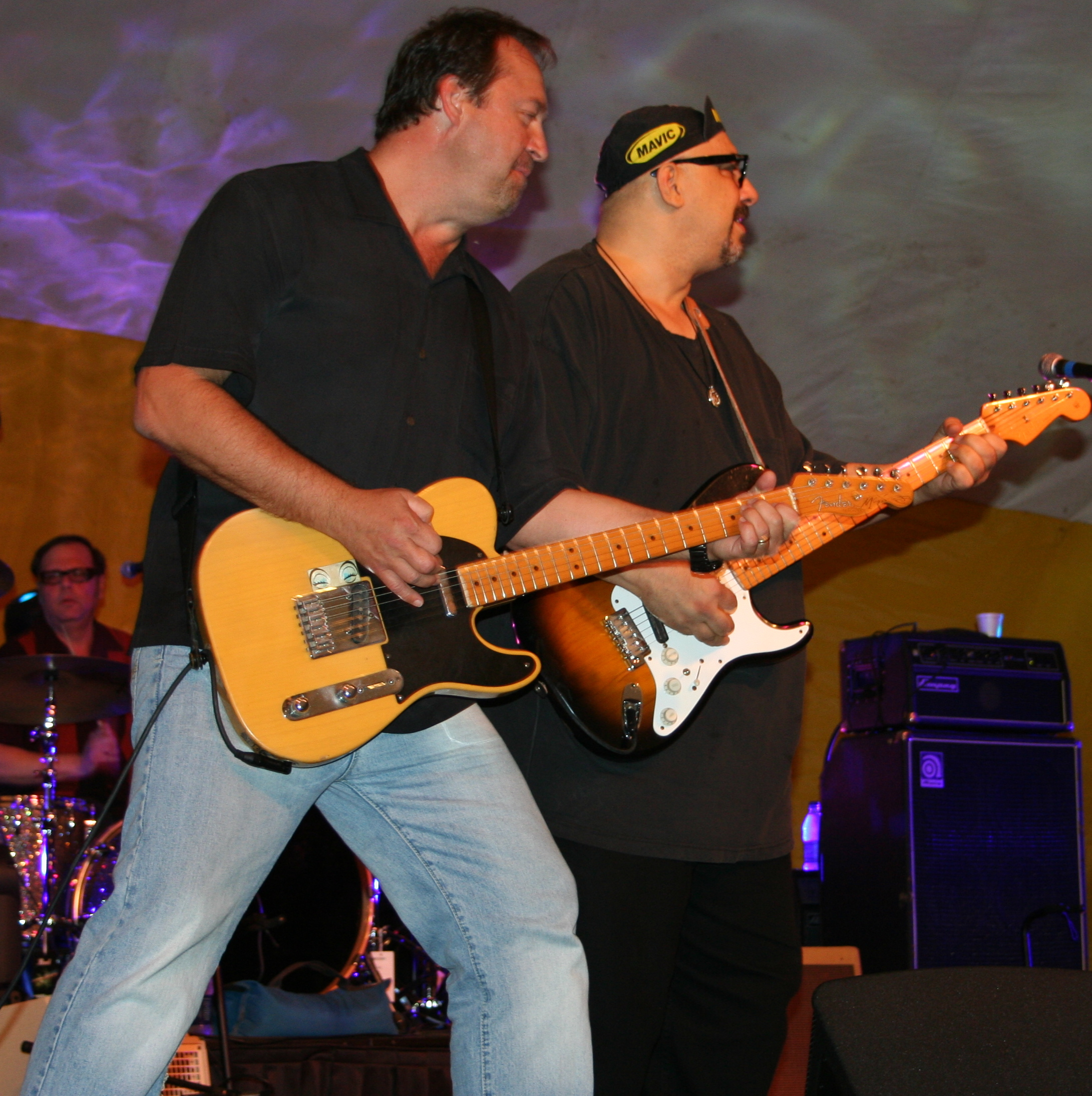
- Diken, Babjak, and DiNizio in 2009

Background information
- Origin: Carteret, New Jersey, U.S.
- Genres: Alternative rock; power pop; college rock; hard rock
- Years active: 1980–present
- Labels: D-Tone Records; Little Ricky Records; Enigma; Restless; Capitol; BMG; RCA; Velvel; Koch; eOne Music
- Members: Jim Babjak; Mike Mesaros; Dennis Diken
- Past members: Pat DiNizio; Severo Jornacion
- Website: OfficialSmithereens.com jimbabjak.com

The Smithereens are an American rock band from Carteret, New Jersey. The group formed in 1980 with members Pat DiNizio (vocals and guitar), Jim Babjak (guitar and vocals), Mike Mesaros (bass guitar and vocals), and Dennis Diken (drums and percussion). This original lineup continued until 2006, when Mesaros left the band and Severo Jornacion took over on bass guitar until Mesaros' return in 2016. After DiNizio died in 2017, the band continued performing live shows as a trio (Babjak, Mesaros and Diken) with various guest vocalists.

The band had a string of hits in the late 1980s through the mid-1990s, including "Only a Memory", "A Girl Like You" and "Too Much Passion". The Smithereens have collaborated with numerous musicians, both in the studio (Belinda Carlisle, Julian Lennon, Lou Reed, Suzanne Vega) and live (Otis Blackwell, Graham Parker and The Kinks). The band named themselves after a favorite word of cartoon character Yosemite Sam.

== History ==
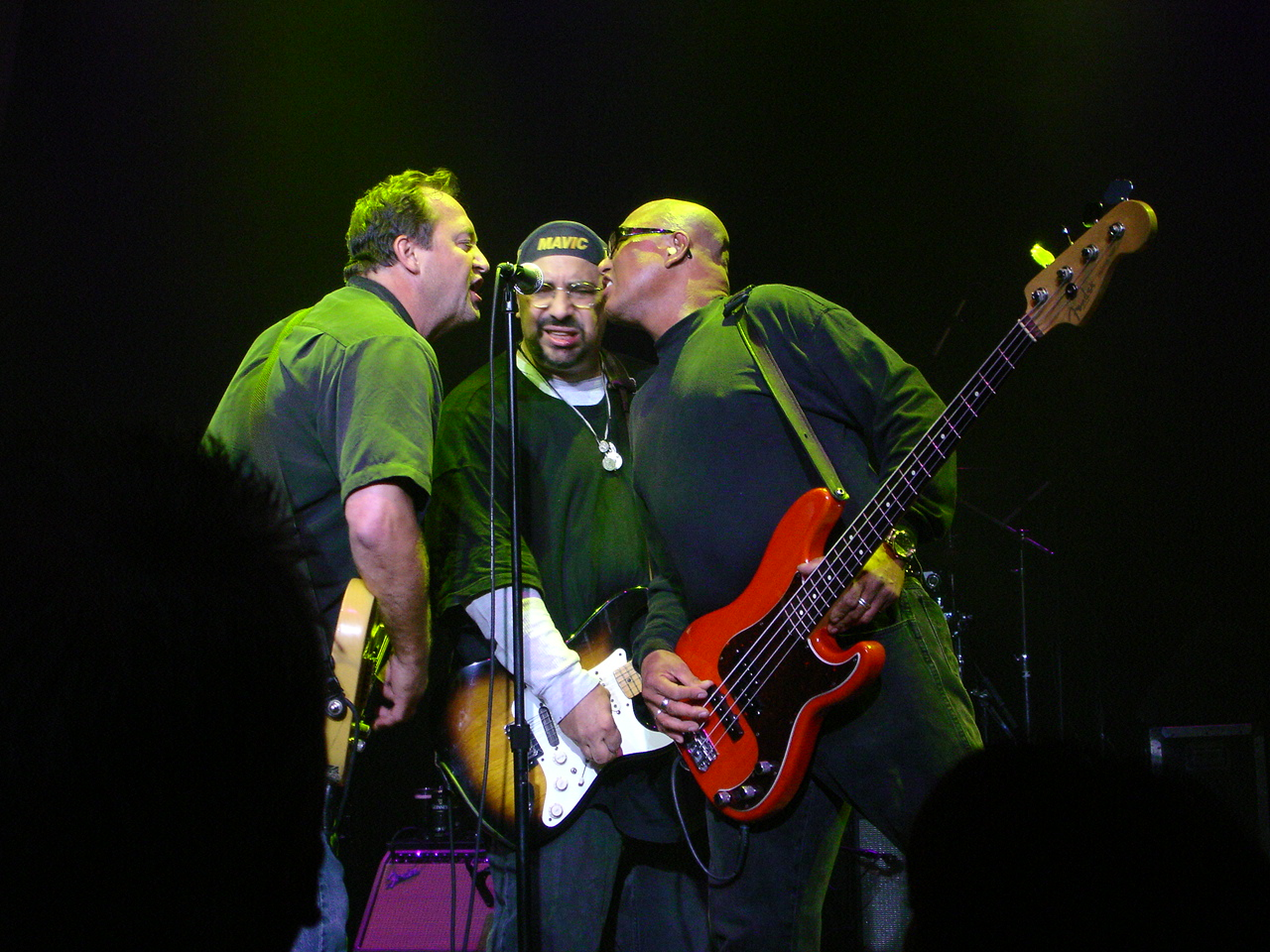
The Smithereens in Grapevine, Texas, 2007.

Babjak, Diken, and Mesaros are all from Carteret, New Jersey, and graduated from Carteret High School in 1975. In 1980, they formed the band with DiNizio, who was from Scotch Plains, New Jersey. DiNizio had placed a classified ad in The Aquarian Weekly looking for a drummer to help on a demo tape – Diken answered it and later introduced his schoolmates Babjak and Mesaros as well.

The band's name derives from the cartoon character Yosemite Sam who often used the expression "I'm-a-gonna blow ya to smithereens!" In 1980 they released the single "Girls About Town" followed by a mini-LP Beauty and Sadness in 1983. In the same period they toured as Otis Blackwell's backing band on a Scandinavian tour in 1984.

After playing mostly around the New York area, the band signed with Enigma. The single "Blood and Roses" from their first album was included on the soundtrack for Dangerously Close, and the music video got moderate rotation on MTV. "Blood and Roses" was also featured on the 1980s TV show Miami Vice during the episode 'The Savage' (first aired February 6, 1987).

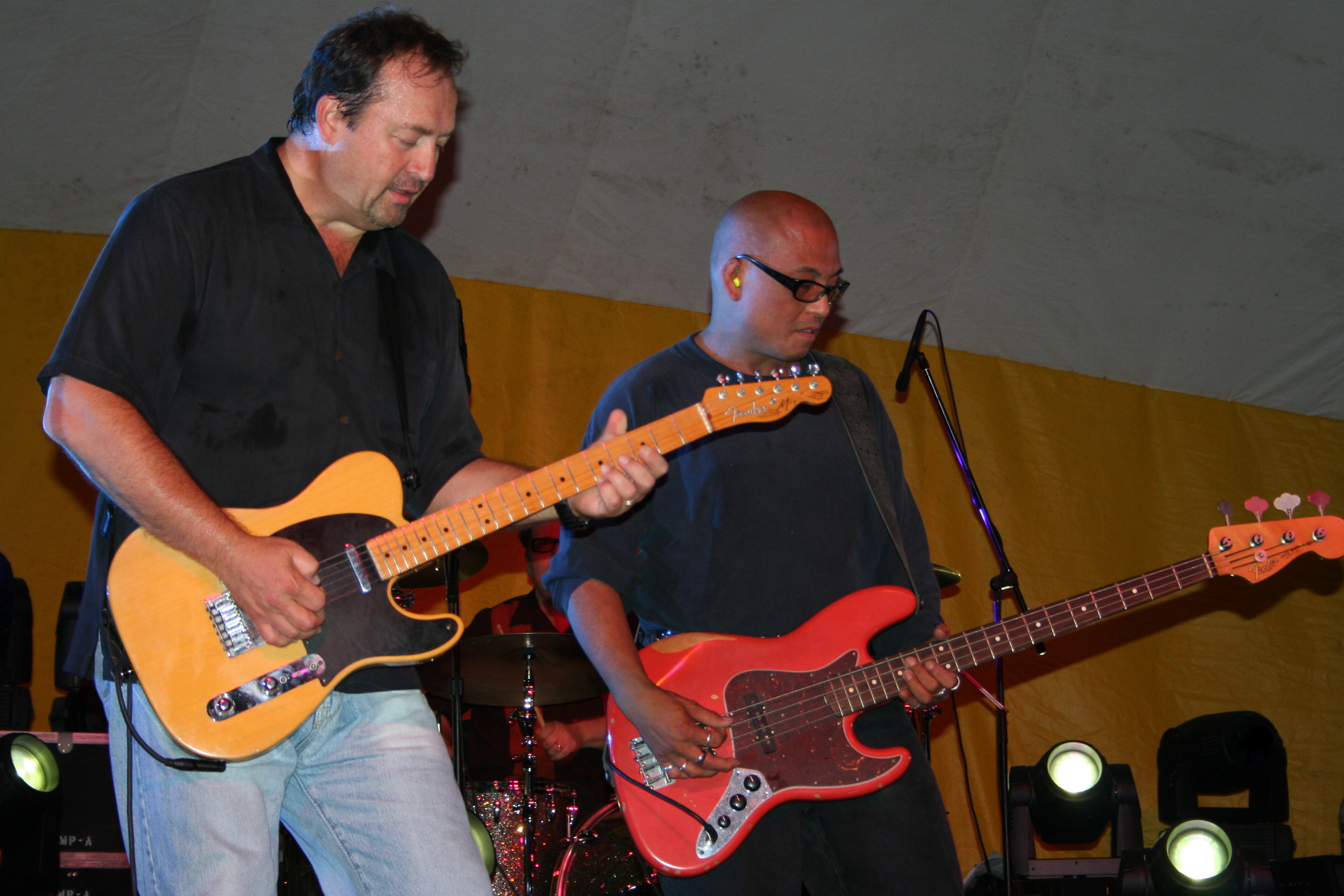
Babjak (left) and Jornacion in 2009 in Rochester, Minnesota

The Smithereens are known for writing and playing catchy 1960s-influenced power pop. Along with a basic East coast roots-rock sound that owed much to musicians who inspired DiNizio, including the Who, the Clash, Elvis Costello and Nick Lowe, The Smithereens deployed a uniquely retro obsession with Mod, the late British Invasion pop of John's Children and the Move and other artifacts of 1950s and 1960s culture that lent its music substance. DiNizio said his single biggest influence was Buddy Holly: "Listening to Buddy Holly, I rediscovered my enjoyment of simple pop structures and pretty melodies...I've always thought of him as a kindred spirit." Likewise, The Who and The Kinks were major influences on Babjak and Diken.

The title and lyrics of their song, “In a Lonely Place," appear to be based on the 1950 Humphrey Bogart film of the same title because of Bogart's lines: "I was born the day I met you, lived a while when you loved me, died a little when we broke apart." The title and artwork for the album 11 were a nod to the original 1960 Ocean's 11 film.

The Smithereens starred as themselves and were featured as entertainment in the indoor beach party scene of the 1986 Troma film Class of Nuke 'Em High, playing the song "Much Too Much". The soundtrack to the film was not released until 2014.

The highest position a Smithereens album attained on the Billboard pop charts was in 1990, when 11 peaked at No. 41 on the strength of the single "A Girl Like You" (which hit No. 38). "A Girl Like You" was originally written to be the title track for the 1989 Cameron Crowe film Say Anything.... The album also featured a duet between DiNizio and Belinda Carlisle on Blue Period.

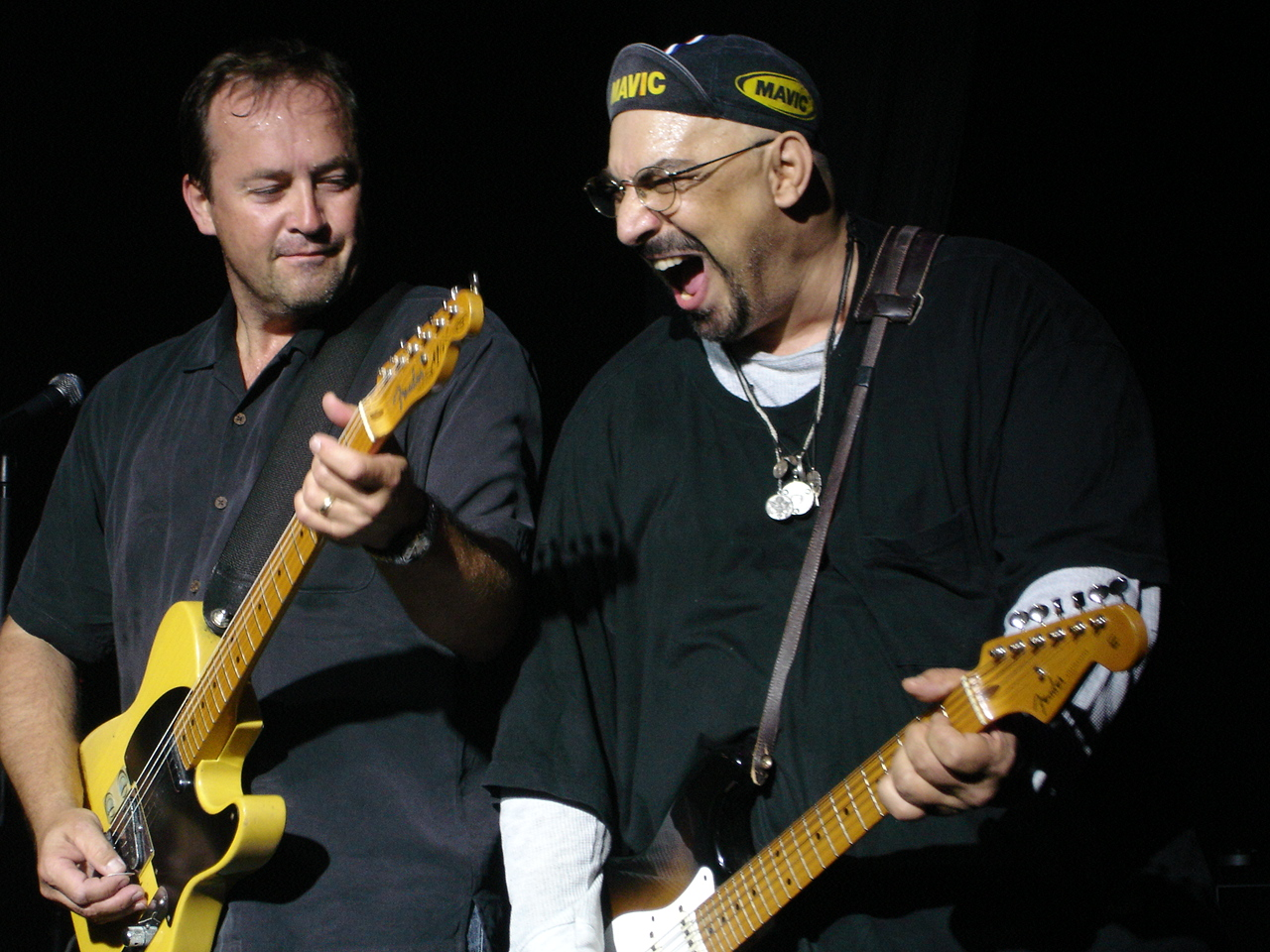
Jim Babjak and Pat DiNizio perform with the Smithereens in Grapevine, Texas, 2007.

The basic tracks for their most recent studio album of original material, titled 2011, were recorded in early October 2010 and the album was released on April 5, 2011.

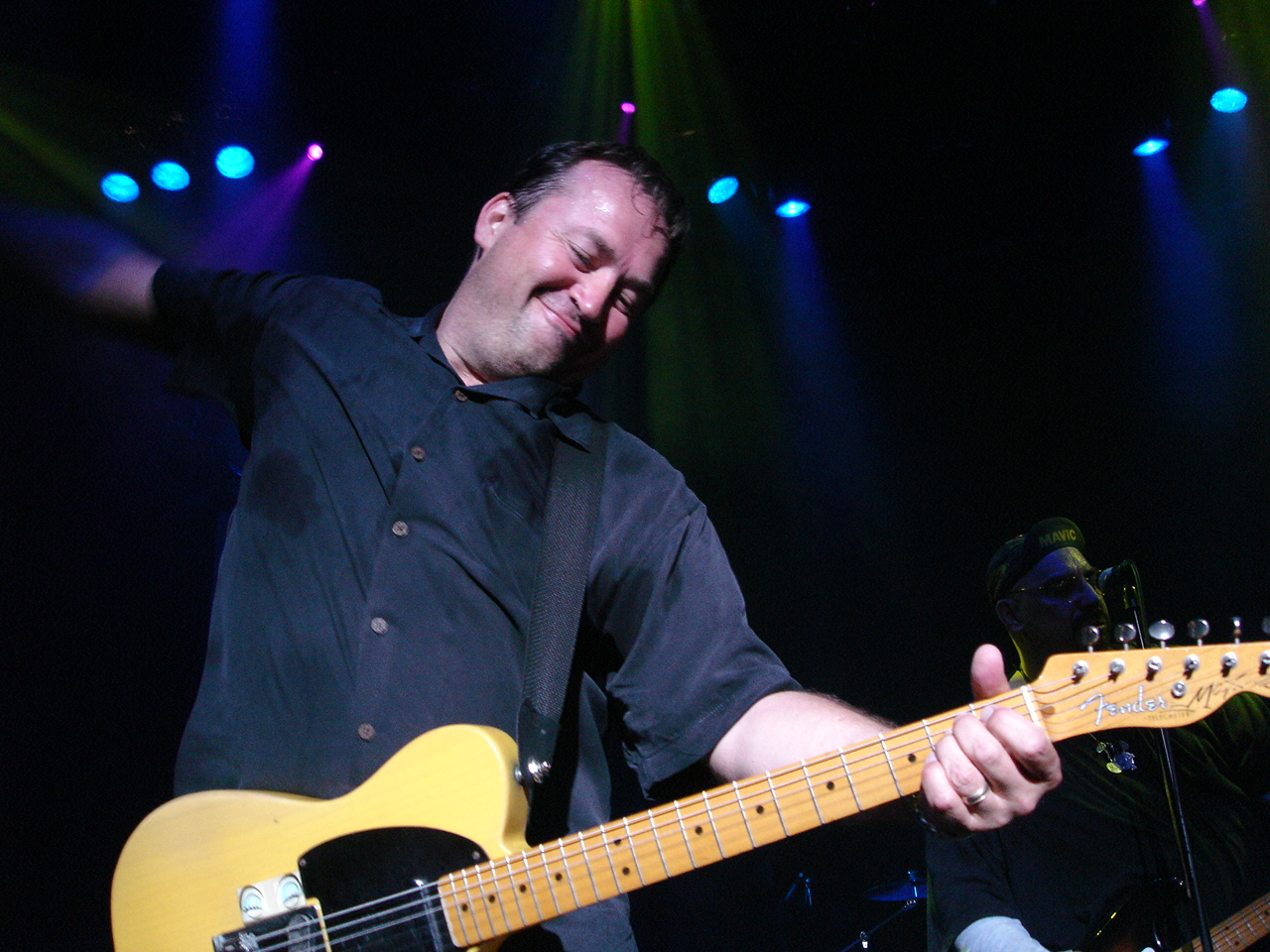
Jim Babjak performs with the Smithereens in Grapevine, Texas, 2007.

The Smithereens were the final band to perform at the fabled Bleecker Street nightclub Kenny's Castaways in Greenwich Village, New York City, in October 2012.

In June 2013, The Smithereens toured as support for Tom Petty and the Heartbreakers.

Original bass player Mike Mesaros reunited with the band in 2016 and 2017 for select performances and continued to tour in 2018 to the present.

DiNizio died in Scotch Plains, New Jersey, on December 12, 2017, at the age of 62. According to bandmates, his health declined following a series of issues that began in 2015, resulting in nerve damage that limited the use of his right hand and arm.

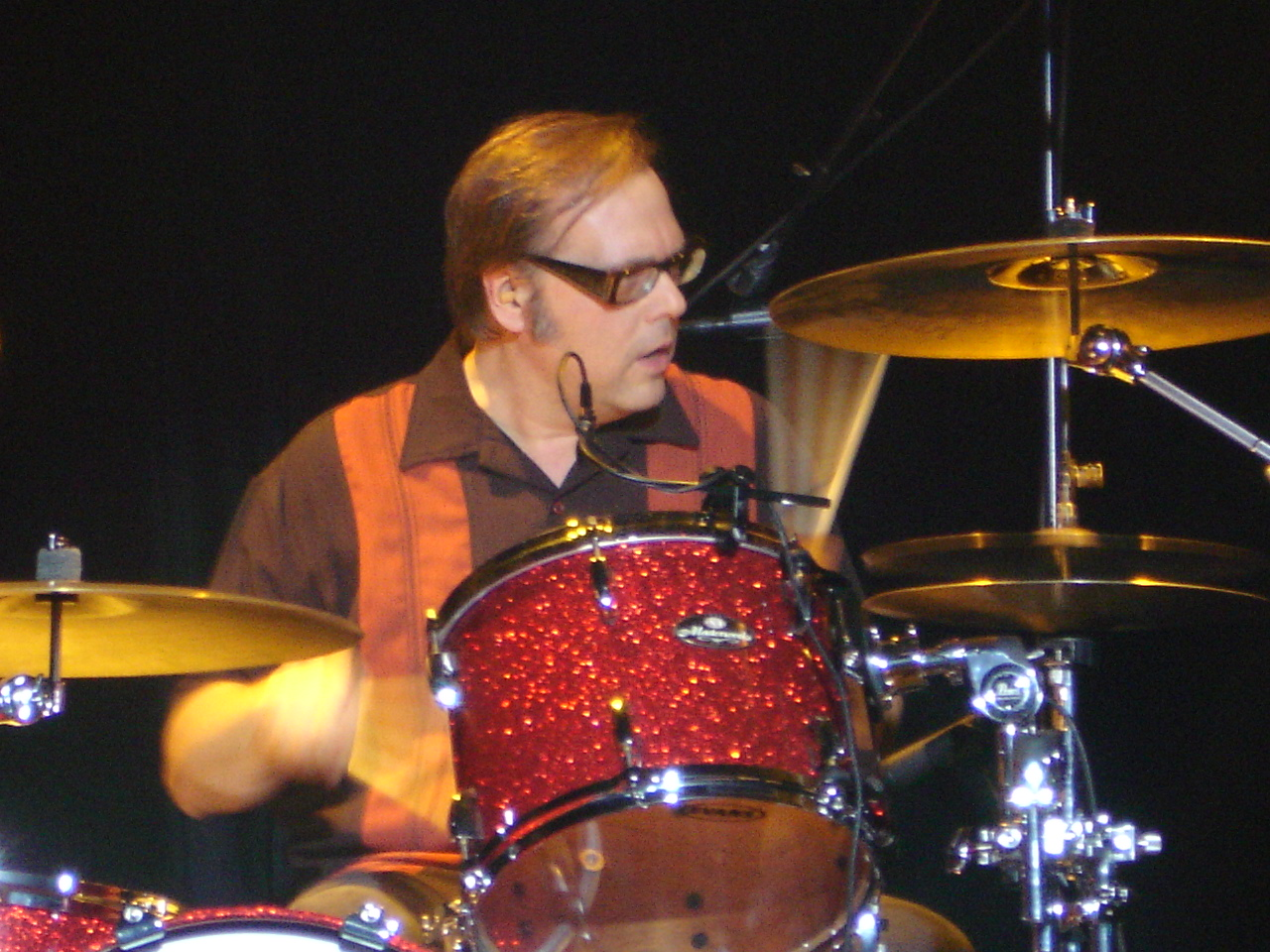
Dennis Diken performs with the Smithereens in Grapevine, Texas, 2007.

The surviving members of the band, including Mesaros, performed together as The Smithereens in a tribute show to DiNizio on January 13, 2018, at the Count Basie Theatre in Red Bank, NJ. In a five-hour concert, the band was joined by Steven Van Zandt, Dave Davies, Ted Leo, Robin Wilson, Lenny Kaye, Southside Johnny, Marshall Crenshaw, Bebe Buell, Richard Barone, Tony Shanahan, Graham Maby, Freedy Johnston, Kenny Howes, John Jorgenson, Peter Zaremba, Keith Streng, producer Ed Stasium, Andy Burton, and various other musicians. The Pat DiNizio Musical Performance Scholarship was established at the Count Basie's Performing Arts Academy.

In 2018, Babjak, Diken and Mesaros decided to continue the band's musical legacy and tour with different guest vocalists, including Marshall Crenshaw and Robin Wilson of the Gin Blossoms, separately taking over lead vocal duties at concerts throughout the United States, including shows in NYC, Chicago, Massachusetts, Colorado and Virginia.

On May 25, 2018, the band released Covers on Sunset Blvd. Records, featuring 22 of the band's favorite songs first recorded by other artists. The CD collects b-sides and movie soundtrack recordings, and some previously unreleased tracks.

On November 16, 2018, The Smithereens were nominated for induction into the New Jersey Hall of Fame, Performing Arts Category, Class of 2018.

In July 2020, the band released a 7-inch vinyl single of their cover of the Beatles' 1962 single "Love Me Do" and its B-side "P.S. I Love You". "Love Me Do" was originally recorded in 2008 during sessions for B-Sides The Beatles but was not considered for inclusion on the album. Both tracks feature session drummer Andy White, who originally performed on the Beatles versions. Mike Mesaros added new bass parts to both tracks and Kristin Pinell of the Grip Weeds guests on melodica.

In September 2022, The Smithereens released The Lost Album. It was originally recorded in 1993 between their recording contracts with Capitol and RCA. Eleven of the songs on The Lost Album (minus the Babjak-penned "I'm Sexy") previously appeared on DiNizio's 1995 Song Demos release (MCA Publishing). Selected songs were also previously included on DiNizio's Songs and Sounds (1997), Pat DiNizio (2005), and The Best of Pat Dinizio (2015).

== Members ==
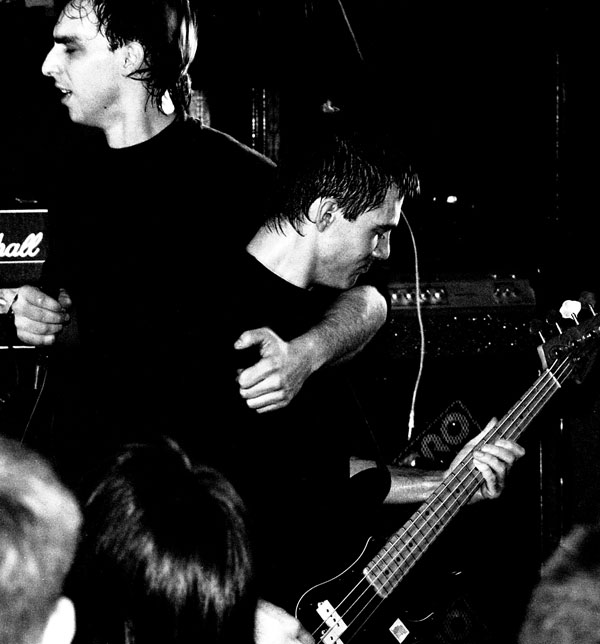
Pat DiNizio and Mike Mesaros in 1984

- Jim Babjak - lead guitar, backing vocals (1980–present)
- Dennis Diken - drums, percussion, backing vocals (1980–present)
- Mike Mesaros – bass guitar, backing vocals (1980–2005, 2016)
- Severo "The Thrilla" Jornacion – bass guitar, backing vocals (2005–present)

=== Former members ===
- Pat DiNizio – lead vocals, rhythm guitar (1980–2017, deceased)

=== Current touring members ===
- Marshall Crenshaw - lead vocals, rhythm guitar (2024–present)
- John Cowsill - lead vocals (2025-present)
- Robin Wilson - lead vocals, rhythm guitar (2019-present, when not touring with The Gin Blossoms)
- Wesley Stace (John Wesley Harding) - lead vocals, acoustic guitar (2026)

=== Former touring members ===
- Kenny Howes - bass, backing vocals (touring substitute for Mike Mesaros, 2016)

== Discography ==
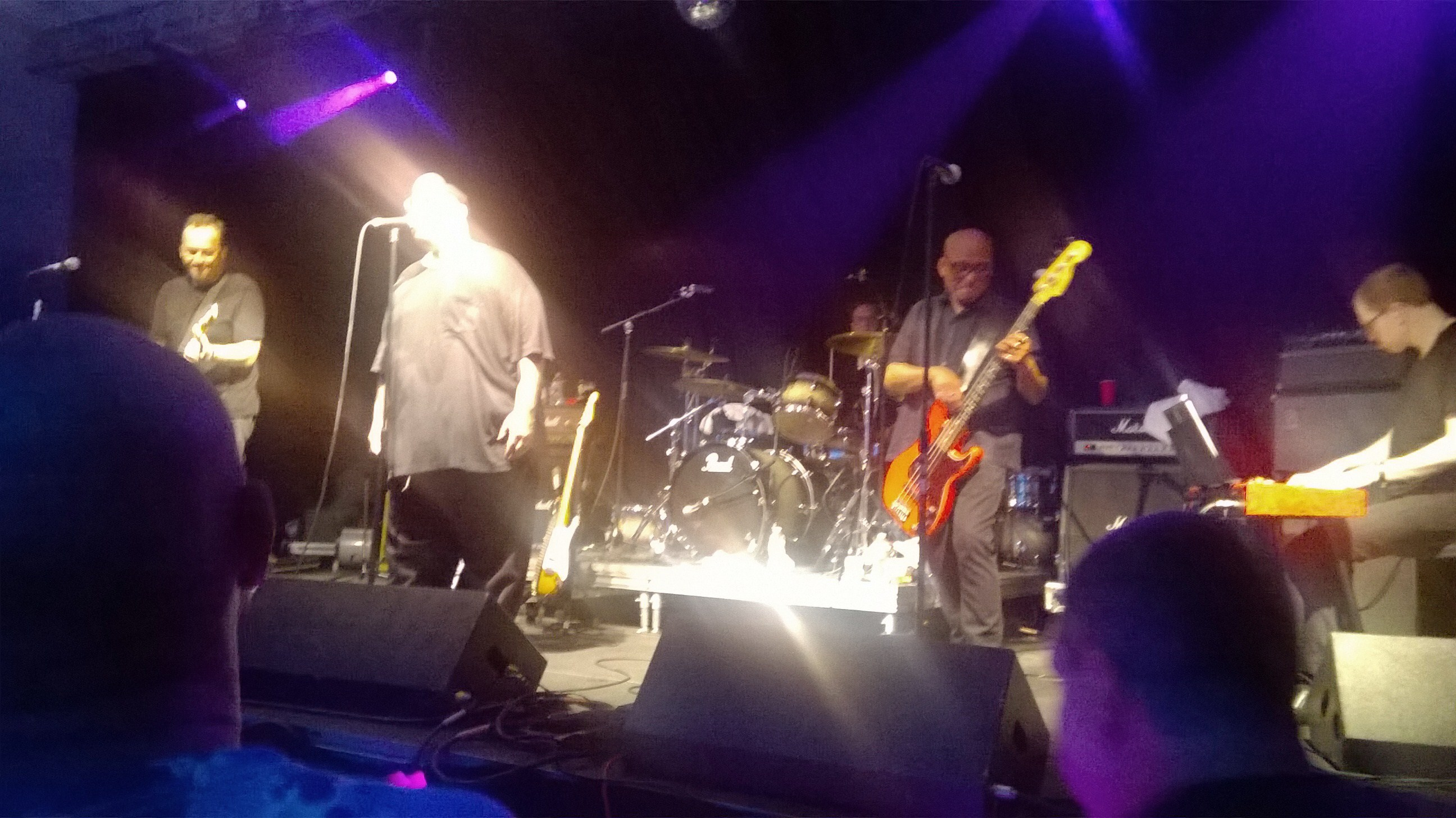
The Smithereens, in 2015: Jim Babjak, Pat DiNizio, Dennis Diken, The Thrilla, and guest Andy Burton

=== Studio albums ===
- Especially for You, 1986 (Enigma, Capitol) US #51, UK INDIE #5
- Green Thoughts, 1988 (Enigma, Capitol) US #60, UK INDIE #7
- 11, 1989 (Enigma, Capitol) US #41
- Blow Up, 1991 (Capitol) US #120
- A Date with The Smithereens, 1994 (RCA, BMG) US #133
- God Save The Smithereens, 1999 (Velvel, Koch)
- Meet The Smithereens!, 2007 (Koch)
- Christmas with The Smithereens, 2007 (Koch)
- B-Sides The Beatles, 2008 (Koch)
- The Smithereens Play Tommy, 2009 (eOne Music)
- 2011, 2011 (eOne Music)
- The Lost Album, 2022 (Sunset Blvd Records) – recorded in 1993

=== Extended plays ===
- Girls About Town, 1980 (D-Tone Records)
- Beauty and Sadness, 1983 (Little Ricky Records, Enigma, Capitol)
- MTV Unplugged, 2011 (The Smithereens Record Company)

=== Live albums ===
- Live, 1988 (Restless)
- Instant Live: Music Midtown Festival Atlanta, GA 5/1/04, 2005 (Instant Live Recordings)
- Extended Versions, 2006 (Sony BMG)
- Live in Concert! Greatest Hits and More, 2008 (Koch)
- The Smithereens Play The Beatles Washington, D.C. February 11, 1964, Concert, 2014 (Not on Label)

=== Compilations ===
- Blown to Smithereens: Best of The Smithereens, 1995 (Capitol)
- Attack of The Smithereens, 1995 (Capitol)
- The Best of The Smithereens, 1997 (EMI, Capitol)
- From Jersey It Came! The Smithereens Anthology, 2004 (Capitol)
- Greatest Hits...Revisited, 2010 (Not on Label)
- Especially for You – 30th Anniversary, 2016 (Not on Label)
- Covers, 2018 (Sunset Blvd Records)

=== Soundtracks and other appearances ===
- The East Coast 60's Rock & Roll Experiment, 1986 (Performance) – "Hang 'Em High (Hang Ten High)"
- Dangerously Close (Original Motion Picture Soundtrack), 1986 (Enigma) – "Blood and Roses", "Some Other Guy"
- Burglar (Original Motion Picture Soundtrack), 1987 (MCA) – "Some Other Guy"
- I Was a Teenage Zombie (Original Motion Picture Soundtrack), 1987 (Capitol) – "Time and Time Again"
- Under the Boardwalk (Original Motion Picture Soundtrack), 1988 (Enigma) – "Blood and Roses"
- Encino Man (Original Motion Picture Soundtrack), 1992 (Hollywood) – "Wooly Bully"
- Timecop (Original Motion Picture Soundtrack), 1994 (RCA) – "Time Won't Let Me" (not included on soundtrack album)
- Fast Track to Nowhere: Songs from the Showtime Original Series Rebel Highway, 1994 (A&M) – "The Stroll"
- Brace Yourself! A Tribute to Otis Blackwell, 1994 (Shanachie) – "Let's Talk About Us"
- Resurrection of the Warlock – A Tribute to Marc Bolan & T-Rex, 1995 (The Old School Records) – "The Slider"
- Classic Rockin' Christmas, 1993 (Koch) – "Rudolph, The Red-Nosed Reindeer"
- One Step Up / Two Steps Back: The Songs of Bruce Springsteen, 1997 (The Right Stuff) – "Downbound Train"
- Romy and Michele's High School Reunion (Original Motion Picture Soundtrack), 1997 (Hollywood) – "Blood and Roses"
- Boys Don't Cry (Original Motion Picture Soundtrack), 1999 (Koch) – "She's Got a Way"
- Burnzy's Last Call (Original Motion Picture Soundtrack), 1999 (Ripe & Ready/Cellsum Records) – "I Don't Want to Look Into the Mirror"
- A Tribute to the King, 2002 (Capitol) – "Don't Be Cruel (Live)"
- Songs from the Material World: A Tribute to George Harrison, 2003 (Koch) – "I Want To Tell You"
- Harold & Kumar Go to White Castle (Original Motion Picture Soundtrack), 2004 (Razor & Tie) – "White Castle Blues"
- Rockin' Christmas, 2005 (Sony BMG) – "Waking Up on Christmas Morning"
- The Sandinista! Project – A Tribute to the Clash, 2007 (00:02:59 Records) – "Up in Heaven (Not Only Here)"
- Class of Nuke 'Em High (Original Motion Picture Soundtrack), 2014 (Ship to Shore PhonoCo.) – "Much Too Much"
- Reacher (TV series, season 3 episode 1 'Persuader') - "Blood and Roses"

=== Singles ===
Year	Song	AUS	CAN	NZ	UK	UK Indie	US	US Mod. Rock	US Main. Rock	Album
1986	"Blood and Roses"	99	—	—	—	—	—	—	14	Especially for You
1986	"Behind the Wall of Sleep"	—	—	—	—	8	—	—	23	Especially for You
1986	"In a Lonely Place"	—	—	—	—	5	—	—	—	Especially for You
1987	"Strangers When We Meet"	—	—	—	—	21	—	—	—	Especially for You
1988	"Only a Memory"	—	—	—	—	—	92	—	1	Green Thoughts
1988	"House We Used to Live In"	—	—	—	—	—	—	—	14	Green Thoughts
1988	"Drown in My Own Tears"	168	—	—	—	—	—	—	34	Green Thoughts
1989	"A Girl Like You"	—	62	—	—	—	38	3	2	11
1990	"Blues Before and After"	—	—	—	—	—	94	18	7	11
1990	"Yesterday Girl"	—	76	—	—	—	—	16	20	11
1990	"Blue Period" (with Belinda Carlisle)	162	—	—	99	—	—	—	—	11
1991	"Top of the Pops"	77	58	—	—	—	—	2	19	Blow Up
1991	"Tell Me When Did Things Go So Wrong"	—	—	—	—	—	—	11	28	Blow Up
1991	"Too Much Passion"	87	22	33	—	—	37	—	—	Blow Up
1991	"Girl in Room 12" (Radio promo)	—	—	—	—	—	—	—	—	Blow Up
1992	"Get a Hold of My Heart" (Radio promo)	—	—	—	—	—	—	—	—	Blow Up
1992	"Rudolph, the Red Nosed Reindeer" (Radio promo)	—	—	—	—	—	—	—	—	Non-album single
1994	"Miles From Nowhere"	—	—	—	—	—	—	—	17	A Date with the Smithereens
1994	"Sick Of Seattle" (Radio promo)	—	—	—	—	—	—	—	—	A Date with the Smithereens
1994	"Everything I Have Is Blue (Gtr. Mix)" (Radio promo)	—	—	—	—	—	—	—	—	A Date with the Smithereens
1994	"Time Won't Let Me" (from the Motion Picture Timecop)	—	—	—	—	—	—	—	—	Non-album single
1997	"Downbound Train"	—	—	—	—	—	—	—	—	One Step Up/Two Steps Back: The Songs of Bruce Springsteen
1999	"She's Got a Way" (Radio promo)	—	—	—	—	—	—	—	—	God Save The Smithereens
2011	"Sorry"	—	—	—	—	—	—	—	—	2011
2011	"One Look At You"	—	—	—	—	—	—	—	—	2011
2020	"Love Me Do"	—	—	—	—	—	—	—	—	Non-album single
2022	"Out of This World"	—	—	—	—	—	—	—	—	The Lost Album

== Music videos ==
Title	Year	Director	Album
"Blood And Roses"	1986	Albert Pyun	Especially For You
"Behind The Wall Of Sleep"	1986	Ken Welzer	Especially For You
"In A Lonely Place"	1986	Ken Ross / Richard Levine	Especially For You
"Only A Memory"	1988	Jim Yukich	Green Thoughts
"House We Used To Live In"	1988	Jim Yukich	Green Thoughts
"Drown In My Own Tears"	1988	Jim Yukich / Jeff Zimmerman	Green Thoughts
"A Girl Like You"	1989	John Lloyd Miller	11
"Blues Before And After"	1990	John Lloyd Miller	11
"Yesterday Girl"	1990	Gregory P. Alosio	11
"Blue Period"	1990	John Lloyd Miller	11
"Top Of The Pops"	1991	John Lloyd Miller	Blow Up
"Too Much Passion"	1991	Jeff Stein	Blow Up
"Miles From Nowhere"	1994	unknown	A Date With The Smithereens
"Time Won't Let Me"	1994	Nigel Dick	Non-album single
"Sorry"	2011	John Rokosny / Andriette Redmann	2011
"One Look at You"	2011	John Rokosny / Andriette Redmann	2011

== Videography ==
- Smithereens 10, 1991
