= Too Much Passion =

Single by The Smithereens

from the album Blow Up
- B-side: "If You Want the Sun to Shine (instrumental version)"
- Released: December 16, 1991
- Genre: Alternative rock, blue-eyed soul
- Length: 4:32
- Label: Capitol
- Songwriter: Pat DiNizio
- Producer: Ed Stasium

The Smithereens singles chronology
| "Top of the Pops" (1991) | "Too Much Passion" (1991) | "Miles From Nowhere" (1994) |

"Too Much Passion" is a song by the American alternative rock group The Smithereens. It is the second single released in support of their fourth album Blow Up.

It hit #8 on the Cash Box Top 100 (dated April 18, 1992) as well as #37 on the Billboard Hot 100 chart. It also provided Smithereens with their first, and to date, only Adult Contemporary charting song, reaching #32 on that chart.

In the Smithereens guitar book, Pat DiNizio explains that he wrote the song to sound like the style of Smokey Robinson. There was also a music video directed by Jeff Stein (known for his work on The Kids Are Alright).

== Formats and track listing ==
All songs written by Pat DiNizio, except where noted.

US cassette single (4KM-44784)

1. "Too Much Passion" – 4:35
2. "If You Want the Sun to Shine (instrumental version)" – 5:56

US CD single (C2-15818)

1. "Too Much Passion" – 4:35
2. "World Keeps Going Round" – 2:40
3. "It Don't Come Easy" – 3:07
4. "If You Want the Sun to Shine (instrumental version)" – 5:56

== Charts ==
Chart performance for "Too Much Passion"
| Chart (1992) | Peak position |
|---|---|
| Australia (ARIA) | 87 |
| Canada Top Singles (RPM) | 22 |
| New Zealand (Recorded Music NZ) | 33 |
| US Billboard Hot 100 | 37 |
| US Adult Contemporary (Billboard) | 32 |
