= Songs from the Material World: A Tribute to George Harrison =

Compilation album by Various Artists
- Released: 25 February 2003
- Recorded: 2002
- Studios: Brandon Post Productions, Somers, NY; Flat Top's Wilderness Studios; House of Vibes Studio, Highland Park, NJ; Show Place Studios, Dover, NJ; The Snake Ranch, London; Unique Recording Studios, New York, NY
- Genre: Rock
- Length: 54:26
- Label: Koch
- Producer: Scott Kuchler

Songs from the Material World is a multi-artist tribute album to English rock musician George Harrison. It was released by Koch Records on 25 February 2003, on what would have been Harrison's 60th birthday. The album contains twelve cover versions of songs written by Harrison, the majority of which originate from his years as a member of the Beatles.

Among the artists who contributed recordings to the compilation are Todd Rundgren, Dave Davies, Leslie West, They Might Be Giants, John Entwistle, Bill Wyman's Rhythm Kings and Wayne Kramer. Proceeds from the sale of the album went to Harrison's charitable organisation, the Material World Charitable Foundation.

== Background and production ==
The Songs from the Material World tribute project was first announced in September 2002, along with news of the imminent release of George Harrison's final studio album, Brainwashed. The line-up of contributing acts was said to comprise Roger McGuinn, Dave Davies, Peter Green, Todd Rundgren, Donovan, Al Kooper, Julian Lennon, They Might Be Giants, Leslie West, Wayne Kramer, Midge Ure and the Smithereens. In December, an eleven-song track list was announced, accompanied by reports stating that Green, Lennon, Donovan, Kooper and Ure would not be participating. The list of songs at this time included a recording of "If I Needed Someone" by McGuinn, yet the track did not appear on the officially released album.

Rundgren and Davies discussed their respective contributions to the project – the Beatles' "While My Guitar Gently Weeps" and Harrison's 1973 solo hit "Give Me Love (Give Me Peace on Earth)". Rundgren said: "Although I was a young guitar player before I'd heard of the Beatles, I'd never heard the term 'lead guitarist.' George created the job description for my first paying gig, the vocation that I'm still lucky enough to practice today …" Davies said he was usually averse to recording other artists' songs, but added: "George Harrison, because of his shining spirituality, is an exception. I pay tribute to George as a great musical talent but primarily as an advanced soul who was unafraid to share his spiritual vision and journey with us."

The artists recorded their contributions at various studios in New York state and New Jersey, including Unique Recording Studios in New York CIty, and at The Snake Ranch in London. Scott Kuchler served as compilation producer while Dirty Boys, Steve Luongo and Todd Park Mohr were all credited as producers of the recordings. The album's cover art was created by Milton Glaser and liner notes were written by musician and journalist John Kruth.

== Release and reception ==
Professional ratings
Review scores
Source	Rating
AllMusic	3/5 stars
Encyclopedia of Popular Music	3/5 stars
Entertainment Weekly	C+
Jam!	(mixed)
Music Emissions	2.5/5 stars

Koch released Songs from the Material World on 25 February 2003. Among contemporary reviews, Jim Farber of Entertainment Weekly highlighted Davies and Entwistle's contributions but otherwise was unimpressed with the album, saying: "Even in death, the quiet Beatle gets short shrift. Only a few tracks on this homage to Harrison do his talent justice." Darryl Sterdan of Jam! admired much of the music but bemoaned the omission of Harrison's "Beatle and solo classics" such as "Something", "My Sweet Lord", "What Is Life" and "All Those Years Ago".

Writing for the website Music Emissions, Dennis Scanland considered Masters of Reality's version of "Devil's Radio" to be the highlight and concluded: "Songs From The Material World is definitely not an essential album but Harrison fans might get a kick out of it."

Johnny Loftus of AllMusic writes that, while the performances are "generally good", the album's sequencing creates "the pacing issues that plague so many multi-artist compilations". Among the highlights of the collection, Loftus identifies Rundgren's "While My Guitar Gently Weeps", which "effortlessly replicates the grandeur" of the Beatles recording, and Kramer's version of "It's All Too Much".

== Track listing ==
All songs written by George Harrison.

No.	Title	Performer(s)	Length
1.	"While My Guitar Gently Weeps"	Todd Rundgren	5:45
2.	"Devil's Radio"	Masters of Reality	3:16
3.	"I Me Mine"	Marc Ford	5:37
4.	"Give Me Love (Give Me Peace on Earth)"	Dave Davies	3:34
5.	"Here Comes the Sun"	John Entwistle	2:47
6.	"Within You Without You"	Big Head Todd & the Monsters	4:45
7.	"Savoy Truffle"	They Might Be Giants	3:06
8.	"I Want to Tell You"	The Smithereens	3:14
9.	"Old Brown Shoe"	Leslie West	5:33
10.	"Taxman"	Bill Wyman's Rhythm Kings	3:55
11.	"It's All Too Much"	Wayne Kramer	5:39
12.	"Isn't It a Pity"	Jay Bennett & Edward Burch	7:15
