= Dennis Diken =

American DJ and record producer (born 1957)

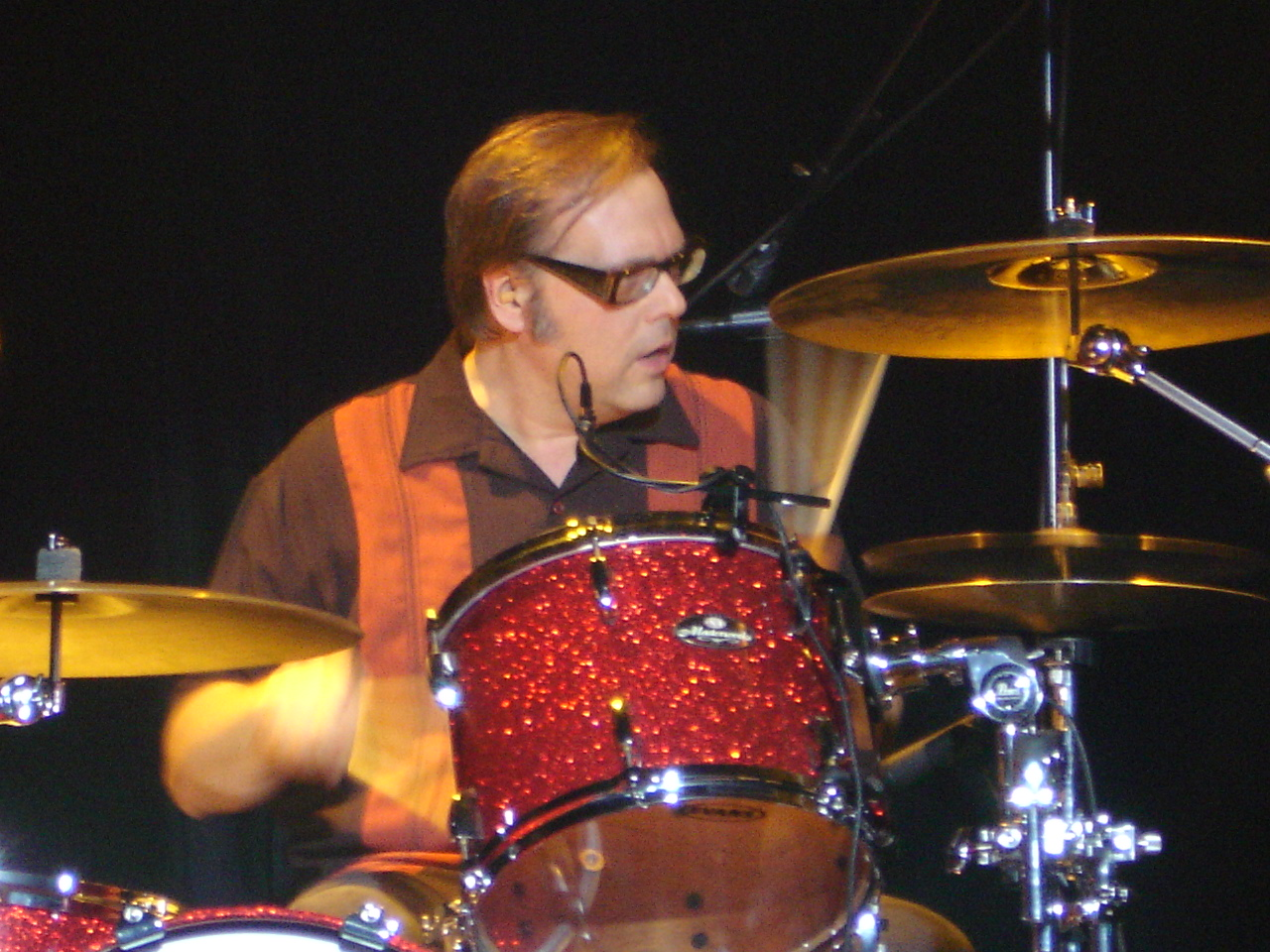
- Dennis Diken performs with the Smithereens in Grapevine, Texas, 2007.

Background information
- Born: February 25, 1957; Belleville, New Jersey, U.S.
- Genre: Rock
- Occupations: Musician; DJ; author; music historian
- Instruments: Drums; vocals
- Years active: 1980–present
- Labels: Cryptovision; Confidential Recordings

Dennis Diken (born February 25, 1957) is an American drummer, DJ, author, music historian, and founding member of the band the Smithereens, which he formed in 1980 with Pat DiNizio, Jim Babjak, and Mike Mesaros in Carteret, New Jersey. Besides playing with the Smithereens, Diken is a fill-in DJ on WFMU as well as a liner notes author and reissue project researcher. As a musician, Diken has recorded or toured with, among others, Ronnie Spector, Dave Davies, Nancy Sinatra, Mary Weiss of the Shangri-Las and Ben E. King, and worked with musicians such as Dave Amels and R. Stevie Moore.

Diken graduated from Carteret High School in 1975, together with Jim Babjak.

== Career ==
Diken has been a constant member of the Smithereens since 1980 but has also worked as a session drummer since the 1980s. He toured with former Shangri-La Mary Weiss in the late 2000s and has since 2014 toured with former Kinks guitarist Dave Davies' solo band. On December 18, 2015, during Dave Davies’ concert at Islington Assembly Hall in London, Diken was drumming while Ray Davies joined his brother Dave on stage for "You Really Got Me". It was the first time the two Kinks had performed together in nearly 2 decades. Diken also toured with Ronnie Spector in the late 2010s.

In 2002, Diken collaborated with keyboardist Dave Amels forming the band Husky Team, which released the album Christmas in Memphis on the Confidential Recording label. The album consists of instrumental Christmas songs recorded with Memphis soul/R&B-style grooves. In 1997, Diken and Amels had produced the track "4th of July, Asbury Park (Sandy)" for Ben E. King on the tribute album One Step Up/Two Steps Back: the Songs of Bruce Springsteen.

Credited to "Dennis Diken with Bell Sound," Diken released the album Late Music in 2009 on Cryptovision Records. Written and recorded with long-time friend Pete DiBella, the 1960s influenced album features contributions from 1960s girl group the Honeys on backing vocals, and musicians Andy Paley and Jason Falkner. Dennis Diken with Bell Sound recorded a version of "Love Grows (Where My Rosemary Goes)" for a fund raising CD titled Super Hits of the Seventies for radio station WFMU in 2012. Diken also recorded two singles in 2014 with the punk rock supergroup Osaka Popstar, "Hopping Ghosts" and "O Holy Night".

As a liner notes author and researcher, Diken has contributed to numerous compilation albums, including collections of the Four Freshmen, Louis Prima, the Lovin' Spoonful, the Four Seasons, and the Beach Boys. He has also had articles published in USA Today and EQ magazine and has contributed to the Billboard Encyclopedia of Record Producers. Diken was also a judge for the 9th, 10th, 11th, 12th, 13th and 14th annual Independent Music Awards to support independent artists' careers. In 1996, he guest starred in the Cartoon Network show Space Ghost: Coast to Coast, in the episode "Surprise", playing himself.

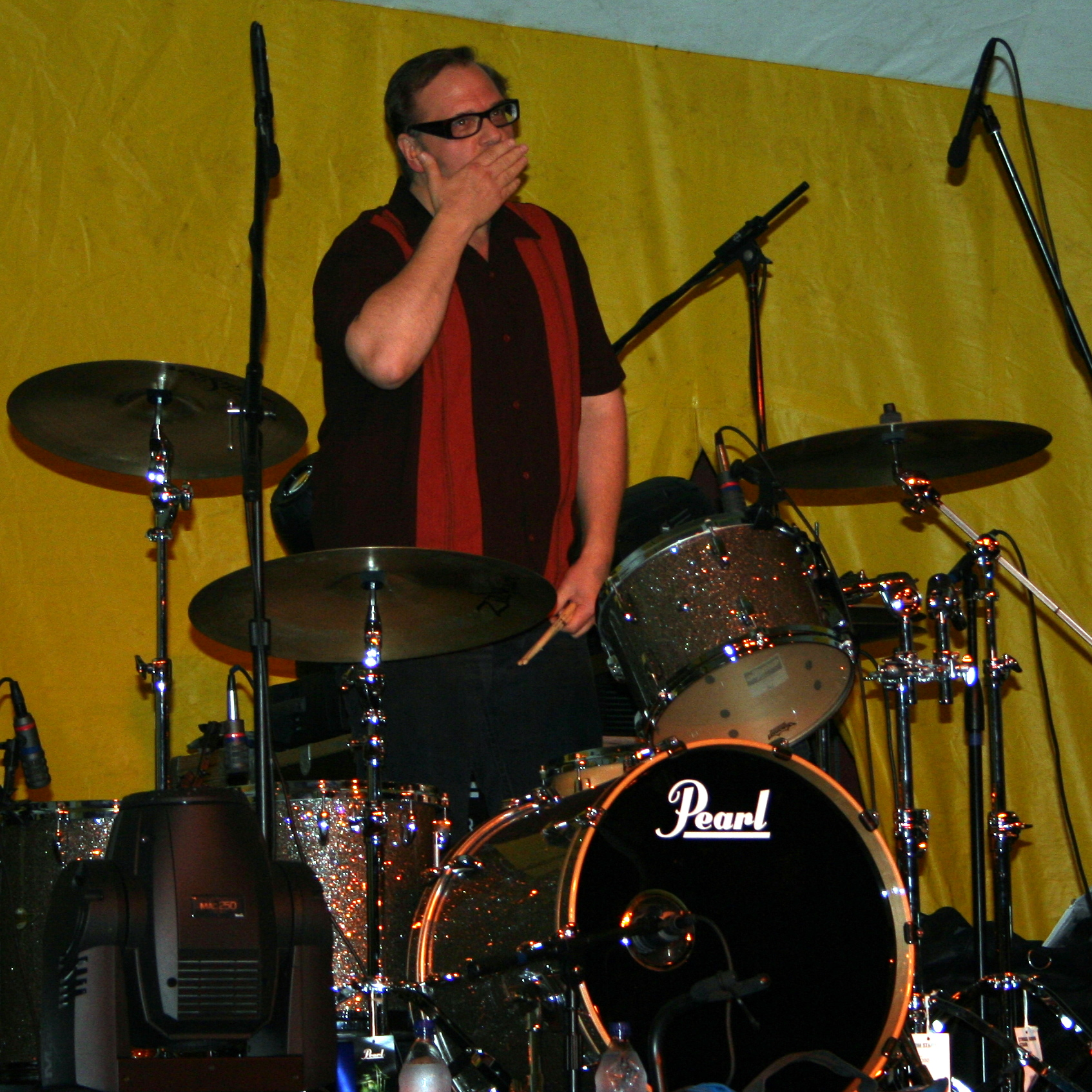
Diken in 2009

== Awards and honors ==
• In 1987 and 1988, the Smithereens won New York Music Awards for best rock band.

• On June 7, 1990, the Smithereens' album 11 was certified gold (500,000 copies sold) by the RIAA.

• On October 27, 2019, the Smithereens were inducted into the New Jersey Hall of Fame in the Class of 2019.

== Selected discography ==
=== Dennis Diken with Bell Sound ===
- Late Music, 2009 (Cryptovision)

=== Husky Team ===
- Christmas in Memphis, 2002 (Confidential Recordings)

=== Solo ===
- Burnzy's Last Call (Motion Picture Soundtrack), 1999 (Ripe & Ready) – "What Will I Do With My Heart" (with Pete DiBella)
- Through a Faraway Window – a Tribute to Jimmy Silva, 2010 (SteadyBoy Records) – "Waking Up" (with Jim Babjak)
- 35!!! Years – Bear Family Records, 2010 (Bear Family Records) – "Bear (In My Garden)"
- Select-O-Hits Limited Edition Sampler, 2011 (Select-O-Hits) – "The Sun's Gonna Shine in the Morning"

=== As session drummer ===
With Jimmy Silva

- Remnants of the Empty Set, 1986 (PopLlama)
- Fly Like a Dog, 1987 (PopLlama)

With Scott McCaughey

- My Chartreuse Opinion, 1989 (PopLlama)

With Chris Von Sneidern

- Wood and Wire, 1997 (Mod Lang Records)
- The Knight of Lines and Proses, 2001 (Criminal Records)

With Bingo Gazingo

- Bingo Gazingo, 1997 (WFMU)

With Bibi Farber

- Firepop, 1998 (Glow Time Records)

With Michael Shelley

- I Blame You, 2001 (Bar/None)

With the Minus 5

- Let the War Against Music Begin, 2001 (Mammoth Records)
- I Don't Know Who I Am (Let the War Against Music Begin Vol. 2), 2003 (Return to Sender)
- Of Monkees and Men, 2016 (Yep Roc Records)

With Buzzed Meg

- The Music from Jim Babjak's Buzzed Meg Part 1, 2001 (Tex Remy Music)

With Marykate O'Neil

- Marykate O'Neil, 2002 (71 Recordings)

With Nancy Sinatra

- Nancy Sinatra, 2004 (Attack Records)

With Jamie Hoover & Bill Lloyd

- Paparazzi, 2004 (The Paisley Pop Label)

With Ronnie Spector

- The Last of the Rock Stars, 2006 (Bad Girl Sounds)

With the Brandos

- Over The Border, 2006 (Blue Rose)

With Joey Ramone

- ...Ya Know?, 2012 (BMG)

With Jeffrey Foskett

- Classic Harmony, 2015 (Vivid Sound)
- You Remind Me of the Sun, 2017 (Vivid Sound)
- 'Elua Aloha, 2018 (Vivid Sound) (with Jeff Larson)

With Dave Davies

- Rippin' Up NYC - Live At City Winery NYC, 2015 (Red River Entertainment)

With Richard Barone

- Sorrows and Promises: Greenwich Village in the 1960s, 2017 (Ship To Shore Phonograph Co.)
