= Jim Babjak =

American guitarist (born 1957)

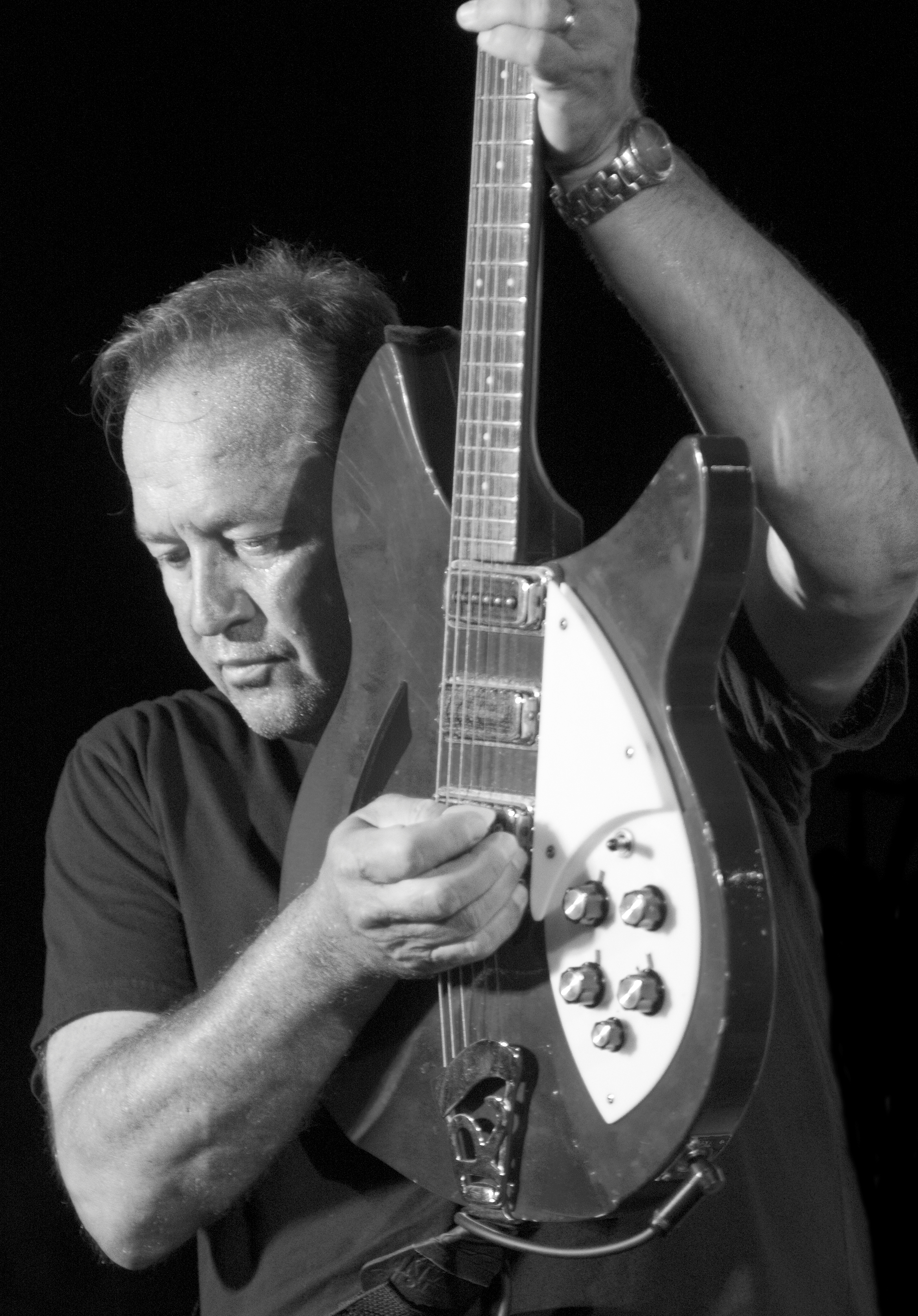
- Babjak performing in 2016

Background information
- Born: Jim Babjak; November 17, 1957 (age 68) Salzburg, Austria
- Origin: Carteret, New Jersey, U.S
- Genres: Rock, power pop
- Occupation: Musician
- Instruments: Vocals, guitar
- Years active: 1980–present
- Labels: Koch d-tone Enigma; Capitol; RCA
- Website: JimBabjak.com

Jim Babjak (born November 17, 1957) is an American guitarist and ex-banker. He is the lead guitar player and co-founder of The Smithereens. Babjak has written and sung several songs for the band. He also is the leader of the band Buzzed Meg.

== Origins ==
Babjak, from Carteret, NJ, formed The Smithereens together with fellow Carteret High School alumni Dennis Diken and Mike Mesaros, along with Pat DiNizio of Scotch Plains, New Jersey.

== Appearances ==
Babjak's music can be heard in the films Bull Durham, Backdraft, Encino Man, Time Cop, Romy & Michele's High School Reunion, Boys Don't Cry, Burglar, Cruel Intentions 2, Harold and Kumar Go To White Castle, and I Now Pronounce You Chuck & Larry. The band made a cameo appearance in the film Class of Nuke 'Em High.

Other accomplishments include musical compositions and performances for the soap operas Passions and The Guiding Light, as well as television and radio commercials for Dairy Queen and Nissan Maxima.

Television credits include Saturday Night Live, Late Night with Conan O'Brien, MTV Unplugged, The Tonight Show with Jay Leno, The Uncle Floyd Show, CBS This Morning, The Dennis Miller Show, and The Arsenio Hall Show.

== Recognition ==
In 2019, Babjak, along with his bandmates in the Smithereens, were inducted into the class of 2018 New Jersey Hall of Fame. He has also been inducted into the White Castle "Cravers Hall of Fame" class of 2002 for his song "White Castle Blues."

Babjak was rated #8 in the Asbury Park Press’ list of The 17 Greatest N.J. Guitarists of All Time.

His composition, "Waking Up on Christmas Morning," was rated # 9 in the Asbury Park Press "The Christmas Top 10".

According to Goldmine Magazine, among the bands influenced by the Smithereens was Nirvana.

Babjak's guitar and other memorabilia from the Smithereens are on display at the Grammy Museum Experience in Newark at the Prudential Center.

In May 2024, on a list including Bruce Springsteen, Les Paul, Al DiMeola, and Lenny Kaye, among others, Guitar World named Babjak one of the 30 Greatest Garden State Guitarists of All Time.

== Personal life ==
Babjak lives in Manalapan Township, New Jersey. At one time, Babjak had a day job working at a bank.
