= Pat DiNizio =

American musician (1955–2017)

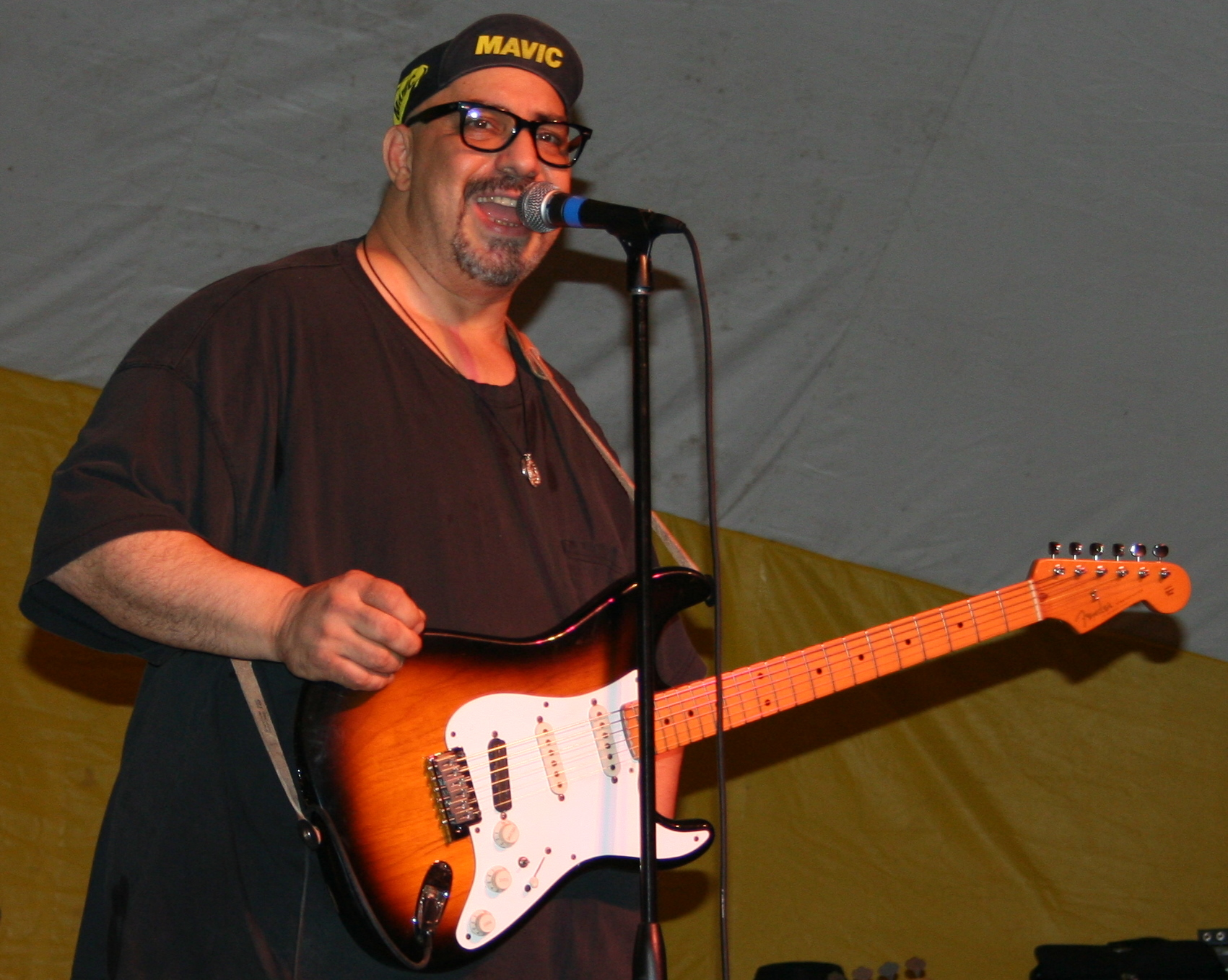
- DiNizio in 2009

Background information
- Born: Patrick Michael DiNizio; October 12, 1955; Plainfield, New Jersey, U.S.
- Died: December 12, 2017 (aged 62) Summit, New Jersey, U.S.
- Genres: Rock, power pop
- Occupations: Musician, songwriter, actor, film producer, politician
- Instruments: Guitar, harmonica, vocals
- Years active: 1980–2017
- Labels: Fuel/Universal, East West Records, Koch Records, Enigma, Little Ricky Records/Capitol, BMG/Excelsior, Velvel Records/Koch Records, E1 Music, Warner Bros., D-Tone
- Formerly of: The Smithereens

Patrick Michael DiNizio (October 12, 1955 – December 12, 2017) was an American musician. He was most notable for being the lead singer, songwriter and founding member of the band The Smithereens, which he formed in 1980 with Jim Babjak, Dennis Diken and Mike Mesaros from Carteret, New Jersey.

== Life and career ==
DiNizio was born in Plainfield, New Jersey, to parents of Italian heritage, Nicholas and Antoniette, and grew up in nearby Scotch Plains, where he attended Scotch Plains-Fanwood High School. DiNizio was a trash hauler, working for his father while trying to break into the music business. He has cited his influences as Buddy Holly and The Beatles.

In addition to his work with The Smithereens, he released a number of solo albums, Songs and Sounds (1997), This is Pat DiNizio, a collection of cover songs arranged for piano and vocals (2006), Revolutions (2 CDs plus 1 DVD, limited edition of 300 copies, 2006), Pat DiNizio (2007), and Pat DiNizio/Buddy Holly (2008). An expanded 2-CD version of This is Pat DiNizio was issued in 2012.

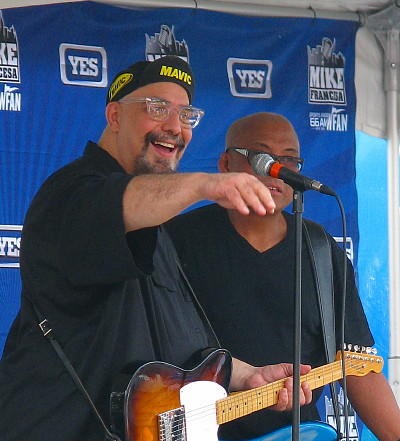
DiNizio and Severo Jornacion of the Smithereens performing at Bar Anticipation in Belmar, New Jersey in 2012

DiNizio made an unsuccessful run in the 2000 United States Senate election in New Jersey, running on the Reform Party ticket. He finished 4th with 19,312 votes (0.64%). The campaign was chronicled in the 2001 documentary film Mr. Smithereen Goes to Washington.

The same year, he launched the "Living Room Tour", a five-month jaunt where he performed solo, by request only, in the homes of fans. The tour was a success, and he later occasionally performed similar concerts for a nominal fee. He considered fans to be friends and hosted Memorial Day picnics for them in his own backyard. In his own words, "This 'involving the audience' philosophy of mine is about breaking down the walls and barriers that traditionally have separated artists and audience."

In 2001, DiNizio was one of the first musicians to throw his support behind XM Satellite Radio, becoming host and program director for the XM Radio Unsigned station. He was also an inaugural member of the Independent Music Awards' judging panel to support independent artists. The Verge was not DiNizio's first radio hosting job; in 1990 he hosted the second season of the short-lived syndicated radio program "Soho Natural Sessions" and in 1991 its successor, "Maxwell House Coffeehouse Sessions".

In 2006, he was the focus of 7th Inning Stretch, an ESPN2 reality special. The special focused on DiNizio's recovery from a "life-threatening and debilitating nervous disorder" by training and attempting to try out for a Minor League Baseball team (The Somerset Patriots), along with tales of baseball folklore from other musicians such as Joan Jett, Gene Simmons, and Bruce Springsteen.

DiNizio also released a book, Confessions Of A Rock Star, and continued to perform both solo acoustic shows and with The Smithereens. From November 2011 to June 2012, DiNizio presented a condensed, live adaptation of the book (with storytelling and full band accompaniment) in nightly performances at the Riviera Hotel & Casino in Las Vegas. Through September 2017, he toured nationally with The Smithereens and performed in venues near his home with his local band, The Scotchplainsmen.

== Death ==
DiNizio died in Summit, New Jersey, on December 12, 2017, at the age of 62. According to bandmates, his health declined following a series of problems that began in 2015 after a pair of falls that resulted in nerve damage that limited the use of his right hand and arm.

== Awards and honors ==
In 1987, Pat DiNizio was nominated for two New York Music Awards (Best Rock Vocalist (Male) and Best Songwriter) and The Smithereens were nominated for four more, the Rising Star Award (Outstanding Debut Act), the Local Heroes Award (Outstanding Rock Band), Best Debut Album (Especially for You), and Best Independent Single ("Blood and Roses"), winning the latter three categories. In 1988, The Smithereens won the New York Music Awards for best rock band.

On June 7, 1990, The Smithereens' recording 11 was certified gold by the RIAA.

On November 17, 2015, DiNizio was inducted into the Scotch Plains-Fanwood High School Hall of Fame.

On April 14, 2016, he was named one of "The 12 Greatest New Jersey Singers Ever" by the Asbury Park Press.

On April 18, 2018, the township of Scotch Plains ceremonially named the street near his former home "Pat DiNizio Way".

On January 18, 2019, DiNizio was inducted as an "Asbury Angel" at the 19th annual Light of Day Winterfest in Asbury Park, New Jersey.

On October 27, 2019, The Smithereens were inducted into the New Jersey Hall of Fame in the Class of 2018.

== Discography ==
=== Studio albums ===
- Songs and Sounds, 1997 (Velvel Records)
- This Is Pat DiNizio, 2006 (Fuel 2000)
- Pat DiNizio, 2007 (East West Records)
- Pat DiNizio/Buddy Holly, 2009 (Koch Records)

=== Compilation albums ===
- The Best of Pat DiNizio, 2015 (Airline Records)

=== Other appearances ===
- Acoustic Aid, 1992 (Kome 98.5, Oxymoron P & D Inc) – "Blood and Roses" (Recorded live in New York City as broadcast on KOME, December 1990)
- Piss & Vinegar - The Songs of Graham Parker, 1996 (Buy Or Die Records) – "Local Girls" and "That's What They All Say" ("Local Girls" performed with Frank Black and Gary Lucas)
- Who's Not Forgotten - FDR's Tribute to The Who, 2003 (Face Down Records) – "Behind Blue Eyes"

== Filmography ==
=== Films ===
- Singles (1992), actor
- Mr. Smithereen Goes to Washington (2001), actor
- King Leisure S.O.B. (2004), writer/director/actor
- Dead Horse (2004), actor/producer/composer

=== Television ===
- Space Ghost: Coast to Coast (1996, Cartoon Network), as himself
- Mother-Tongue: Italian-American Sons and Mothers (1999), as himself
- 7th Inning Stretch (2006, ESPN2), actor/director/writer/producer

== Bibliography ==
- Meth, Clifford Lawrence (2003). Wearing the Horns. Foreword by Pat DiNizio. Aardwolf Publishing. ASIN B007AHL18Q.
- Milano, Brett (2003). Vinyl Junkies. Foreword by Pat DiNizio. St Martin's Griffin. ISBN 978-0312304270
- DiNizio, Pat (2009). Confessions Of A Rock Star.
