= I Dreamed I Was a Very Clean Tramp =

Memoir by Richard Hell

I Dreamed I Was a Very Clean Tramp: An Autobiography
- Author: Richard Hell
- Language: English
- Genre: Autobiography, memoir
- Publisher: Ecco / HarperCollins
- Publication date: March 12, 2013
- Publication place: United States
- Media type: Print (hardcover and paperback), e-book, audiobook
- Pages: 293
- ISBN: 978-0-06-219083-3
- Preceded by: Godlike (2005)
- Followed by: Massive Pissed Love (2015)

I Dreamed I Was a Very Clean Tramp: An Autobiography is a 2013 memoir by the American writer and musician Richard Hell, published in March 2013 by Ecco, an imprint of HarperCollins. The book recounts Hell's childhood in Lexington, Kentucky, his arrival in New York City in 1966 at the age of seventeen, his transformation from aspiring poet to a founding figure of the punk scene at CBGB with Television, The Heartbreakers, and Richard Hell and the Voidoids, and his subsequent decline into heroin addiction. The narrative ends in 1984, the year Hell retired from music to focus on writing.

Tramp received widespread critical attention upon publication. It was reviewed in The New York Times, The New York Times Book Review, Bookforum, Publishers Weekly (in a starred review), Kirkus Reviews, and Booklist.

== Background ==
Hell had been associated with the New York punk scene since the mid-1970s and had retired from music in 1984 to focus on prose, publishing the novels Go Now (1996) and Godlike (2005), the journals collection Artifact (1990), and the omnibus Hot and Cold (2001) before turning to autobiography. In an interview with BOMB tied to the book's release, Hell told Laura Feinstein that he had agreed to write the memoir partly because he owed his publisher a book and had no fiction project ready at the time.

== Content ==
The memoir is structured chronologically, opening with Hell's childhood as Richard Meyers in Kentucky, the death of his father when he was seven, and his decision at seventeen to leave Lexington for New York City with the ambition of becoming a poet. Hell describes his early years in the East Village in the late 1960s and early 1970s, his friendship and musical partnership with the guitarist Tom Miller (later Tom Verlaine), the formation of Television, and his subsequent work with The Heartbreakers and Richard Hell and the Voidoids, including the writing of "Blank Generation". He also describes many of his significant romantic relationships, including with Patty Oldenburg (wife of sculptor Claes Oldenburg), photographer Roberta Bayley, singer-songwriter Lizzy Mercier Descloux, and groupies Nancy Spungen and Sable Starr. The latter sections of the book recount his deepening heroin addiction in the late 1970s and early 1980s, the fraught recording process for Destiny Street, and his decision in 1984 to leave music for writing; the narrative does not extend into his subsequent literary career.

== Publication ==
I Dreamed I Was a Very Clean Tramp was published in hardcover by Ecco on March 12, 2013. A paperback edition followed on February 18, 2014.

== Reception ==
Kirkus Reviews called the book a deft, lyrical chronicle and praised Hell's willingness to be unsparing about former associates such as Johnny Thunders and Sid Vicious. Publishers Weekly gave it a starred review, finding that Hell's songwriting voice carried successfully into prose, and Booklist's June Sawyers singled out his evocations of 1970s New York City.

Zach Baron's essay "Hell Is Other People" in Bookforum argued that Hell's importance lay less in his music than in his work as a critic and arbiter of taste, and noting his frank handling of disputes with Tom Verlaine, Patti Smith, and Lester Bangs. In The Rumpus, the New York University literature professor Bryan Waterman––author of the 33⅓ volume on Television's Marquee Moon––framed the autobiography as an American narrative of self-invention through flight and compared its treatment of the Hell–Verlaine partnership to Patti Smith's Just Kids. A further essay-review at Vol. 1 Brooklyn situated the book within the gentrification of the Bowery. Hell also gave a long-form interview to Laura Feinstein in BOMB and appeared on The Leonard Lopate Show on WNYC on March 8, 2013.
