= R.I.P. (Richard Hell album) =

Compilation album by Richard Hell
- Released: 1984
- Genre: Punk rock
- Label: ROIR

Richard Hell chronology
| Destiny Street (1982) | R.I.P. (1984) | Go Now (1995) |

R.I.P. is a compilation album by the American musician Richard Hell, released in 1984. It was originally released in cassette format, and was rereleased in 1990 with different artwork. The compilation includes songs by the Hell-fronted bands the Heartbreakers and the Voidoids, as well as songs credited to Hell. It contains demo, live, and studio recordings. R.I.P. was a "farewell" album, as Hell wanted to leave music in order to do more writing (although he played some 1985 shows with a band dubbed the Thing).

== Production ==
The songs on R.I.P. range from 1975 to 1984. The compilation includes the original Heartbreakers version of "Love Comes in Spurts"; "I Live My Life" is a cover of the Fats Domino song. "Cruel Way to Go Down" was written by Allen Toussaint, and was recorded in New Orleans by Hell with Ziggy Modeliste. "Going Going Gone" is a cover of the Bob Dylan song. The liner notes were penned by Hell, as Lester Meyers.

== Critical reception ==
Professional ratings
Review scores
| Source | Rating |
|---|---|
| AllMusic | 4.5/5 stars |
| Robert Christgau | B+ |
| The Encyclopedia of Popular Music | 3/5 stars |
| MusicHound Rock: The Essential Album Guide | 3/5 stars |
| The Rolling Stone Album Guide | 3.5/5 stars |
| Spin Alternative Record Guide | 6/10 |

The New York Times determined that "Hell is a poet and lyricist whose work shares certain influences with the Beat writers more than it is influenced directly by them—the nightmare imagery and obsessive loathing that leap from the pages of Lautreamont's Maldoror, Rimbaud's vision of poetry as self-immolation, the word collages of Tristan Tzara and his performing associates in Dada at Zurich's Cabaret Voltaire during World War I."

The Washington Post panned the sound of the album, but praised the guitar playing of Robert Quine. Trouser Press stated: "Neither as mannered as his first LP nor as professional as his second, this collection showcases his most uninhibited singing on retreads, live takes and previously unissued material." The Providence Journal-Bulletin called Hell's 1984 New Orleans songs "purposeful, passionate and intense—as punky, in a word—as anything Hell has ever done."

AllMusic wrote that "the sound quality is consistent for the most part, and the music is rough, raw, and rocking—in other words, classic Richard Hell."

== Track listing ==
| No. | Title | Artist | Length |
|---|---|---|---|
| 1. | "Love Comes in Spurts" | The Heartbreakers |
| 2. | "Can't Keep My Eyes on You" | The Heartbreakers |
| 3. | "Hurt Me" | The Heartbreakers |
| 4. | "I'm Your Man" | The Voidoids |
| 5. | "Betrayal Takes Two" | The Voidoids |
| 6. | "Crack of Dawn" | The Voidoids |
| 7. | "Ignore That Door" | The Voidoids |
| 8. | "I Live My Life" | The Voidoids |
| 9. | "Going Going Gone" | The Voidoids |
| 10. | "I Can Only Give You Everything" | The Voidoids |
| 11. | "I Been Sleepin' on It" | Richard Hell |
| 12. | "Cruel Way to Go Down" | Richard Hell |
| 13. | "The Hunter Was Drowned" | Richard Hell |
| 14. | "Hey Sweetheart" | Richard Hell |
