= Alan Betrock =

American music critic, publisher, editor, author, and record producer

- Born: 1950; United States
- Died: April 9, 2000 (aged 49); New York City, U.S.
- Occupations: Music critic, publisher, editor, author, archivist, record producer, record label owner
- Years active: 1971–2000

Alan Betrock (1950 – April 9, 2000) was an American music critic, publisher, editor, author and record producer. Initially a music critic, Betrock founded the influential New York Rocker magazine in 1976 and the publishing house Shake Books in 1979. He has written and edited several books, including the critically acclaimed Girl Groups: The Story of a Sound. He produced Blondie's first demos in 1975 and launched the short-lived record label Shake Records. He has produced and/or released music by such artists as Marshall Crenshaw, Richard Hell and the Voidoids, the dB's and the Smithereens.

== Early career ==
A native of Queens, New York City, Betrock went to Newtown High School in Queens and attended Queens College. He founded the fanzine JAMZ as an undergrad in 1971, which led to Rock Marketplace in 1973. The magazine united record collectors nationwide in the search for obscure releases and included articles that established catalog numbers and release dates. Betrock himself was a passionate record collector with encyclopedic musical knowledge and a passion for obscure 1960s and 1970s garage rock singles. He became fascinated with rock music during the rise of the British Invasion and frequently travelled to England in search for rare albums and singles. "I'd hear a record on radio and try to seek it out, but it was very hard to find if it wasn't in the top 30," he said in a 1972 interview in The New York Times. During this period Betrock also wrote for a number of music magazines, such as Phonograph Record, ZigZag and Hit Parader, as well as local newspaper SoHo Weekly News. From the mid-1970s onward, he compiled various compilation albums for labels such as Pye and Rhino, as well as writing liner notes.

== Later period ==
Not long after its December 1973 opening, Betrock found his way to gigs at CBGB in Manhattan's East Village. Witnessing the emergence of bands like Television, the Ramones and Talking Heads, he immersed himself completely in the new underground music scene. In 1975, Betrock financed and produced a demo for the then-unknown Blondie, whom he originally intended to manage. However, a combination of his other interests and lack of confidence in their musical abilities ended his involvement with the band. Betrock chose instead to manage another New York band, the Marbles.

In February 1976, Betrock launched the influential New York Rocker magazine, chronicling the rising punk rock scene and other musical trends in the late 1970s. According to Andy Schwartz, New York Rocker's publisher and editor from 1978 to 1983, the magazine was a "visionary move, the product of Betrock’s realization that the music rising from a run-down Bowery bar deserved its own magazine – one with its own style of photography and graphic design, one that would blend a fan’s enthusiasm with an educated critical eye. Through the pages of New York Rocker, Alan Betrock defined the new rock and roll".

A conceptualist, Betrock created board game centerfolds ("How to Become a New York Rock Star") and imaginary 45 rpm picture sleeves for "singles we’d like to see." The magazine also collaborated with fashion designer Anna Sui, photographers Steven Meisel and Roberta Bayley, and artist Duncan Hannah, among many others. During this time he also worked as the East Coast editor for Bomp! magazine. After 11 issues, Betrock left New York Rocker in late 1977. "Alan was one of those people who plunged himself into something with tremendous enthusiasm and dedication, and when he was done with it, he was done," remembered Andy Schwartz.

Meanwhile, he amassed a collection of miscellaneous American pop memorabilia. The archives became the source for several books on American magazines and their history. Mostly published on his own Shake Books during the 1980s and 1990s, Betrock wrote and edited books on, among other things, teenage exploitation films, rock and scandal magazines, and the history of the pinup. His 1982 book, Girl Groups: The Story of a Sound, which spawned a documentary film in 1983, was lauded by the critic Robert Palmer in The New York Times as "everything a rock 'n' roll genre study should be."

== Music production ==
His short-lived Shake Records (1979–1981) was the first to release recordings by the dB's, the Cosmopolitans and Marshall Crenshaw. Later non-Shake Betrock productions included Richard Hell and the Voidoids’ Destiny Street (1982) and the Smithereens’ Beauty and Sadness EP (1983).

In 1989, Betrock began working on a recording project with Ronnie Spector. A planned album never materialized, but five tracks were eventually released on the EP Something's Gonna Happen in 2003.

== Death ==
Betrock died of cancer at Calvary Hospital in the Bronx, New York City on April 9, 2000, aged 49. He was diagnosed less than two months before his death. Lenny Kaye, longtime guitarist with Patti Smith, told MTV: "A good man, and a record/pop culture collector of the highest order. I always admired his thoroughness, in whatever field he touched." In 2013, Marshall Crenshaw told Songfacts: "He launched my career, and I badly regret that he and I didn't do more stuff together. That was one of my bad blunders."

== Bibliography ==
- Rock 'N' Roll Movie Posters (Shake Books, 1979)
- Girl Groups: The Story of a Sound (Delilah Books, 1982) ISBN 0-933-32825-7
- The I Was a Teenage Juvenile Delinquent Rock'N'Roll Horror Beach Party Movie Book: A Complete Guide to the Teen Exploitation Film, 1954–1969 (St. Martin's Press, 1986) ISBN 0-312-40293-7
- The Personality Index to Hollywood Scandal Magazines, 1952–1966 (Shake Books, 1988) ISBN 0-962-68331-0
- The Best of James Dean in the "Scandal Magazines" 1955–1958 (Shake Books, 1988)
- Cult Exploitation Movie Posters, 1940–1973 (Shake Books, 1989)
- The Tabloid Poster Book, 1959–'69 – The Wildest Wallpaper You've Ever Seen (Shake Books, 1989)
- Unseen America: The Greatest Cult Exploitation Magazines, 1950–1966 (Shake Books, 1990) ISBN 0-962-68330-2
- Hitsville: The 100 Greatest Rock 'n' Roll Magazines, 1954–1968 (Shake Books, 1991) ISBN 0-962-68332-9
- From Exploitation to Sexploitation: Four Decades of Adult Film Posters, 1930s–1960s (Shake Books, 1992) ISBN 0-962-68333-7
- Jayne Mansfield Vs. Mamie Van Doren: Battle of the Blondes: A Pictorial History (Shake Books, 1993) ISBN 0-962-68334-5
- Pin-Up Mania: The Golden Age of Men's Magazines, 1950–1967 (Shake Books, 1993) ISBN 0-962-68335-3
- The Illustrated Price Guide to Cult Magazines, 1945 to 1969: 25 Years of Exploitation (Shake Books, 1994) ISBN 0-962-68336-1
- The Illustrated Price Guide to Scandal Magazines, 1952–1966 (Shake Books, 1994)
- I Was a 1950's Pin-Up Model! From the Collection of Mark Rotenberg (Shake Books, 1995) ISBN 0-962-68337-X
- Sleazy Business: A Pictorial History of Exploitation Tabloids (Shake Books, 1996) ISBN 0-962-68338-8
- Bikinis & Lingerie: A Pictorial Guide to Pin-Up Magazines, 1945–1960 (Shake Books, 1998) ISBN 0-962-68339-6
- Cult Magazine Checklist Guide: Issue by Issue Listings for the Most Collectible Cult Magazines, 1945–1973 (Shake Books, 2000) ISBN 1-893-59901-9

== As producer ==
- Blondie: "Out in the Streets", "Platinum Blonde", "The Thin Line", "Puerto Rico", "Once I Had a Love (The Disco Song)" (1975 demos)
- Sneakers: In the Red (1978) (co-produced with Mitch Easter and Chris Stamey)
- Chris Stamey and the dB's: "(I Thought) You Wanted To Know" (1978, single) (co-produced with Richard Lloyd and Chris Stamey)
- Marshall Crenshaw: "Something's Gonna Happen", (1981, single) (co-produced with Marshall Crenshaw)
- The dB's: Stands for Decibels (1981) (co-produced with The dB's)
- Richard Hell and the Voidoids: Destiny Street (1982)
- The Smithereens: Beauty and Sadness (1983, EP)
- Ronnie Spector: Something's Gonna Happen (2003, EP) (produced four of five tracks)
