= Beauty and Sadness =

Beauty and Sadness may refer to:

- Beauty and Sadness (EP), a 1983 EP by The Smithereens
- Beauty and Sadness (novel), a 1964 novel by Yasunari Kawabata
