= Sanford School =

Private school in Hockessin, Delaware, US

Location
- 6900 Lancaster Pike; Hockessin, Delaware 19707; United States; 39°46′23″N 75°40′37″W

Information
- Type: Private school
- Motto: No Talent Lies Latent
- Established: 1930 (96 years ago)
- Founder: Sanford and Ellen Sawin
- CEEB code: 080070
- Headmaster: Jaime L. Morgan '02
- Grades: Preschool to 12
- Enrollment: 700
- Colors: Blue and gold
- Nickname: Sanford Warriors
- Accreditation: Middle States Association of Colleges and Schools, Pennsylvania Association of Independent Schools
- Website: www.sanfordschool.org

Sanford School is a co-educational private school in Hockessin, Delaware that teaches students from preschool to high school.

The school was founded by Sanford and Ellen Sawin as the Sunny Hills School on September 23, 1930.

In 1966, the name Sunny Hills School was changed to Sanford School.

In 2027, Niche ranked Sanford School No. 2 of 15 private K-12 schools in Delaware and No. 265 of 2,848 private K-12 schools in the United States.

== Sports ==
Sanford School competes in interscholastic sports as a member of the Delaware Independent School Conference.

Sanford School has won 10 boys' basketball championships and five girls' basketball championships. They are the first school in their conference to win both the girls and boys state basketball championships for two consecutive years in 2010 and 2011.

== Notable alumni ==
- Trevor Cooney, Syracuse basketball player
- Walter Davis, UNC player and NBA star
- Luis Estevez, Cuban-born American fashion designer and costume designer
- Richard Hell, punk musician, member of Television, Richard Hell and the Voidoids, The Heartbreakers, and Neon Boys
- Deon Jones, basketball player
- Tom Verlaine, punk musician, member of Television and Neon Boys
