= Patty Mucha =

American artist, performer, and poet (born 1935)

Patty Mucha (born Patricia Joan Muschinski, June 26, 1935), also known as Patty Oldenburg, is an American artist, performer, and poet associated with the Pop Art and Happenings movements of the early 1960s. As the first wife of the sculptor Claes Oldenburg from 1960 to 1970, she sewed many of his earliest soft sculptures, including Floor Cake, Floor Cone, and Floor Burger (1962), and performed in his Happenings, including Circus (Ironworks/Fotodeath) (1961) and the Ray Gun Theater series (1962). She was the lead singer of Andy Warhol's short-lived 1963 avant-garde band The Druds. She lives in Saint Johnsbury, Vermont.

== Early life and education ==
Mucha was born in Milwaukee, Wisconsin, the daughter of farmers, and has two brothers, Joseph and Ralph. Her paternal grandfather had emigrated from Poland under the name Mucha, which he later Americanized to Muschinski. She attended Pulaski High School in Milwaukee and earned a degree in art from the Wisconsin State Teachers College in Milwaukee (now the University of Wisconsin–Milwaukee). In the summer of 1954 she attended the Ox-Bow School of Painting in Saugatuck, Michigan, where she first met Claes Oldenburg while modeling. She moved to New York City in 1957.

== Career ==
=== Happenings and soft sculpture ===
Mucha and Oldenburg were married in 1960. During the marriage she was a central collaborator in his early work, sewing the fabric soft sculptures that he conceived and patterned. Oldenburg later said that the technique grew directly out of the costumes and props she sewed for Happenings, and that the first large soft sculptures—Floor Cake, Floor Cone, and the hamburger—were translated from his templates by her. The Metropolitan Museum of Art describes works of this period as collaborations with Mucha, "who sewed the works from Oldenburg's templates."

Mucha performed in numerous Happenings of the early 1960s. She appeared in Oldenburg's Circus (Ironworks/Fotodeath) at the Reuben Gallery in 1961, and a photograph of her in the piece by Robert R. McElroy was used as the cover image of Michael Kirby's 1965 book Happenings: An Illustrated Anthology. She also performed in Oldenburg's Ray Gun Theater (1962) and in works by Jim Dine, Robert Whitman, Allan Kaprow, Dick Higgins, Alex Hay, Steve Paxton, Simone Forti, and Sally Gross.

She is also the subject of several Oldenburg works, including the drawing Pat Reading in Bed, Lenox (1959) at the Whitney Museum of American Art and the sculpture Patty with Cloud at the Metropolitan Museum of Art.

=== Film and music ===
In 1963 Mucha was the lead singer of The Druds, a short-lived avant-garde band assembled by Andy Warhol whose members also included Walter De Maria, Larry Poons, La Monte Young, Lucas Samaras, and Jasper Johns.

She appeared with Oldenburg in Warhol's 1963 film Tarzan and Jane Regained… Sort of, and in films by Robert Breer, Rudy Wurlitzer, Jean Dupuy, Rudy Burckhardt, and Red Grooms.

=== Writing ===
She has published two volumes of poetry, Poems Traveling, 1971–1973 (Panorama, 1973) and See Vermont: Poems, 1974–1978 (Poets Mimeo Cooperative, 1979). Her essay "Soft Sculpture Sunshine" appeared in the catalog Seductive Subversion: Women Pop Artists, 1958–1968 (Abbeville Press, 2010), accompanying the touring exhibition of the same name organized by the University of the Arts in Philadelphia, which traveled to the Brooklyn Museum and Tufts University Art Gallery. As of 2024, she was at work on a memoir, Threads (earlier titled Clean Slate: My Life in the 1960's New York Art World), portions of which have appeared in Art in America.

== Personal life ==
Mucha and Oldenburg divorced in 1970. In 1968, while separating from Oldenburg, she dated the writer and musician Richard Hell (then Richard Meyers), who was 19 at the time. Their relationship lasted two years.

== Archives ==
The Patty Mucha Papers (MSS.342), comprising her correspondence, manuscripts, photographs, and other materials from 1949 to 2016, are held at the Fales Library and Special Collections at New York University. The Smithsonian Institution's Archives of American Art recorded an oral history interview with Mucha on May 10, 2024, conducted by the art historian Michael Lobel. A separate oral history was recorded in 2015 by the Robert Rauschenberg Foundation Oral History Project at Columbia University.

== Sources ==
- "Mucha, Patty". Union List of Artist Names. Getty Research Institute. ID 500355446.
- Hell, Richard (2013). I Dreamed I Was a Very Clean Tramp: An Autobiography. New York: Ecco/HarperCollins. p. 75-82. ISBN 978-0-06-219083-9.
- "Claes Oldenburg: Patty with Cloud". The Metropolitan Museum of Art.
- Mucha, Patty (May 10, 2024). "Oral history interview with Patty Mucha, 2024 May 10". Archives of American Art. Smithsonian Institution.
- Mucha, Patty (2015). "Oral history interview with Patty Mucha, 2015". Robert Rauschenberg Foundation Oral History Project. Columbia Center for Oral History Research, Columbia University.
- "Patty Mucha Papers, 1949–2016". Fales Library and Special Collections. New York University. MSS.342.
- Rose, Barbara (2015). "Claes Oldenburg". Interview.
- Sachs, Sid; Minioudaki, Kalliopi, eds. (2010). Seductive Subversion: Women Pop Artists, 1958–1968. New York: Abbeville Press. ISBN 978-0-7892-1065-4. OCLC 656365556.
- Wallace, David S. "Not Another Rock 'n' Roll Poet". Poetry Foundation.
