= In the Car =

Painting by Roy Lichtenstein

- Artist: Roy Lichtenstein
- Year: 1963
- Movement: Pop art
- Dimensions: 172 cm × 203.5 cm (67.75 in × 80.125 in)
- Location: Scottish National Gallery of Modern Art, Edinburgh

In the Car (sometimes Driving) is a 1963 pop art painting by Roy Lichtenstein. The smaller, older of the two versions of this painting formerly held the record for highest auction price for a Lichtenstein painting. The larger version has been in the collection of the Scottish National Gallery of Modern Art in Edinburgh since 1980.

== Background ==
The source for In the Car was Girls' Romances number 78 (September 1961).

The painting is based on a panel illustrated by Tony Abruzzo in the comic book series Girls' Romances #78, dated September 1961 and published by Signal Publishing Corp. (a romance comic imprint of DC Comics). The painting was part of Lichtenstein's second solo exhibition at Leo Castelli Gallery from September 28 to October 24, 1963 that included Drowning Girl, Torpedo...Los!, Baseball Manager, Conversation, and Whaam! Marketing materials for the show included the lithograph artwork, Crak!

The smaller version, which was the original version, from the estate of Roy Lichtenstein and consigned by his son Mitchell Lichtenstein, was sold in 2005. On November 8, 2005, it surpassed the previous Lichtenstein work record auction price of $7.1 million set when Happy Tears sold three years earlier (November 13, 2002). In the Car sold for $16.2 million at Christie's auction house in New York City. In November 2010, this figure was surpassed when Ohhh...Alright... was sold for a record US $42.6 million (£26.7 million), also at Christie's in New York. The hammer price was $38 million.

== Details ==
After 1972, Lichtenstein's comics-based women "look hard, crisp, brittle, and uniformly modish in appearance, as if they all came out of the same pot of makeup." This particular example is one of several that is cropped so closely that the hair flows beyond the edges of the canvas. As with most of his early romance comics, this consisted of "a boy and a girl" subject. It is described as a tense, melodramatic graphic single-frame depiction of a romantic dialogue between a man and woman. Lichtenstein used horizontal parallel lines to convey the sense of motion. A November 1963 Art Magazine review stated that this was one of the "broad and powerful paintings" of the 1963 exhibition at Castelli's Gallery.

In the early 1960s, Lichtenstein produced several "fantasy drama" paintings of women in love affairs with domineering men causing the women to be miserable, such as Drowning Girl, Hopeless and In the Car. These works served as prelude to 1964 paintings of innocent "girls next door" in a variety of tenuous emotional states. "In the Car evokes a mood of resignation, with silence apparently prevailing as the woman stares stonily out the window."

In the Car is one of the artworks that Lichtenstein showed interest in discussing gender and identity. The depiction of a woman in the driver’s seat has been interpreted as engaging with ideas about gender roles, autonomy, and power dynamics.

== See also ==
- 1963 in art
