= New York Rocker =

Magazine

- Cover of the February 1982 issue, featuring The Blasters
- Country: United States
- Based in: New York City
- Language: English

New York Rocker was a punk rock new wave magazine founded by Alan Betrock in 1976. In 1979, it had a circulation of 20,000. Betrock left the magazine in 1978, and Andy Schwartz took over as editor until 1982. When the magazine suspended publication in October 1982, Schwartz said, "There are people ready to finance the magazine, to put it on the footing it should be on." However, his optimism that "our chances are a lot better than others" of returning proved unfounded, and the magazine was closed that same year.

It published a total of 55 regular issues during its lifetime, plus a May 1979 issue of pictorial content named PIX and two issues of a resurrected version published by Iman Lababedi in 1984.

Ira Kaplan, guitarist and singer for Yo La Tengo, was a critic for the magazine. The dB's wrote and recorded the song, "I Read New York Rocker" in tribute to the magazine and recorded several demos in the magazine's offices.

== See also ==
- Punk
