= Punk (magazine) =

Music magazine and fanzine

- April 1976 cover featuring Joey Ramone
- Categories: Punk rock
- First issue: January 1976; 50 years ago
- Final issue: 1979; 47 years ago
- Country: United States
- Based in: New York City
- Language: English
- Website: punkmagazine.com

Punk was a music magazine and fanzine created by cartoonist John Holmstrom, publisher Ged Dunn, and "resident punk" Legs McNeil in 1975. It was one of the earliest punk zines, and helped bring attention to the early New York CBGB scene, popularizing the use of the term "punk rock" as a descriptor for contemporary music scenes; previously it was used strictly retroactively to refer to mid-1960s garage rock.

== History ==
Punk magazine began in late 1975, Holmstrom, Dunn and McNeil drew visual inspiration for the fanzine from underground comic books, mixing Mad Magazine-style cartooning by Holmstrom, Bobby London and a young Peter Bagge with the more straightforward pop journalism of the kind found in Creem. The publication primarily focused on the New York underground music scene, which included the early New York punk scene centered around venues like CBGB, Zeppz, and Max's Kansas City. Punk released its first issue in January 1976, featuring Lou Reed on the cover. Though predated by Billy Altman's magazine of the same name founded in May 1973, Altman's punk magazine was largely devoted to discussion of 1960s garage and psychedelic acts rather than the New York punk scene.

Punk magazine hosted writers such as Mary Harron, Steve Taylor, Lester Bangs, Pam Brown, some of which were writing for a publication for the very first time. Alongside, artists like Buz Vaultz, Anya Phillips, Screaming Mad George, and photographers Bob Gruen, Barak Berkowitz, Roberta Bayley and David Godlis.

After Dunn left in early 1977 and McNeil quit shortly afterwards, Bruce Carleton (art director, 1977–1979), Ken Weiner (contributor, 1977–79), and Elin Wilder, one of few African Americans involved in the early CBGB/punk rock scene, were added to the staff. It also provided an outlet for female writers, artists and photographers who had been shut out of a male-dominated underground publishing scene. Between April 1976 and June 1979, Chris Stein of Blondie was a contributing photographer. Consequently, the band were regularly featured and Debbie Harry would frequently appear as one of the characters in the photo-stories. Holmstrom later called the magazine "the print version of the Ramones".

Punk published 15 issues between 1976 and 1979, as well as a special issue in 1981 (The D.O.A. Filmbook), a 25th anniversary special in 2001 and 3 final issues in 2007.

== Issues ==
A complete list of issues

Volume	Number	Title	Cover	Date
1	1	Lou Reed	Lou Reed	January 1976
1	2	Patti Smith	The Two Faces of Patti Smith	March 1976
1	3	The Ramones	Joey Ramone	April 1976
1	4	Iggy Pop	The Incredible Iggy	July 1976
1	5	The Monkees	Micky Dolenz chases Jane	August 1976
1	6	The Legend of Nick Detroit	Debbie Harry, Judy LaPilusa and Richard Hell	October 1976
1	7	Patti Smith	Rock'n'roll Patti	February 1977
1	8	The Sex Pistols	The Sex Pistols	March 1977
1	10	Blondie	Debbie Harry onstage!	Summer 1977
1	11	The Dictators	Handsome Dick Manitoba of the Dictators	October/November 1977
1	12	Robert Gordon	Robert Gordon is Red Hot!	January 1978
1	14	The Sex Pistols	Johnny Rotten and Sid Vicious puppets: Live and in concert!	May/June 1978
1	15	Mutant Monster Beach Party	The movie poster for Mutant Monster Beach Party	July/August 1978
1	16	Disco Maniac	Disco sucks!	March/April 1979
1	17	The Clash	The Clash in a clash	May/June 1979
Special	1	D.O.A.: A Rite of Passage The Official Filmbook	Johnny, Sid, Steve and Paul.	April 1981
2	0	Special 25th Anniversary Issue		Winter 2001
1	19	Johnny Heff and The Bullys	Johnny Heff and The Bullys	Winter 2007
1	20	Sid + Nancy	Sid + Nancy	Summer 2007
1	21	A Tribute to CBGB		Fall 2007
1	22	Iggy Pop - Every Loser	Iggy Pop - issued with copies of Iggy Pop's album Every Loser	Jan 2023
1	23	Battle Of The Bands	The Misfits	Fall 2024
1	24	Punk/Mani	Double issue with Mani issue 30	Winter 2025
1	25	Deborah Harry	Produced for a retrospective exhibition '50th Anniversary of PUNK Magazine!' at Ki Smith Gallery, New York	Winter 2025

There were no issues 9, 13 or 18

== Bibliography ==
- Laing, Dave (2015). One Chord Wonders: Power and Meaning in Punk Rock. PM Press. ISBN 978-1-62963-057-1.
