= Carolyn H. Rhodes =

American literary scholar and professor (1925–2019)

- Carolyn H. Meyers, later Rhodes, from a 1962 newspaper
- Born: Carolyn Hodgson; May 16, 1925; Birmingham, Alabama, U.S.
- Died: March 24, 2019 (age 93); Norfolk, Virginia, U.S.
- Occupation: College professor
- Children: 2, including Richard Hell
- Relatives: Patty Smyth (daughter-in-law from 1985 to 1986)

Carolyn Hodgson Rhodes (May 16, 1925 – March 24, 2019) was an American literary scholar. She was a professor of English and women's studies at Old Dominion University from 1965 to 1990, and helped to establish the university's women's studies program. In the 1980s she was a Fulbright lecturer in Romania and China.

== Early life and education ==
Rhodes was born in Birmingham, Alabama, the daughter of Lester Hodgson and Dolly Griffin Hodgson (later Carroll). She graduated from Hunter College High School in New York City. She earned a bachelor's degree in English and psychology at the University of Alabama, and a master's degree in psychology from Columbia University. She earned a second master's degree and a Ph.D. from the University of Kentucky in 1965. While she was a graduate student at Kentucky, she was active in the Central Kentucky Civil Liberties Union. Her dissertation was titled "Psychological Manipulation in the Utopian Novel, 1923-1963".

== Career ==
Rhodes taught at Old Dominion University (ODU) from 1965 until she retired in 1990. She was co-founder of the University Women's Caucus in 1973, and helped establish the university's women's studies program. She was also a co-founder and trustee of the school's Feminist Education Trust Fund.

Rhodes was president of the women's caucus of the South Atlantic Modern Language Association from 1975 to 1976. She chaired the awards committee of the Science Fiction Research Association in the 1970s. She was a Fulbright lecturer at Babes-Bolyai University in Romania from 1982 to 1983, and she was the first American Fulbright lecturer at Peking University in Beijing from 1986 to 1988.

== Publications ==
- "Intelligence Testing in Utopia" (1971)
- "Frederick Winslow Taylor's System of Scientific Management in Zamiatin's We" (1976)
- First Person Female American: A Selected and Annotated Bibliography of the Autobiographies of American Women Living After 1950 (1980, editor, with associate editors Ernest Rhodes and Mary Louise Briscoe)
- "New Women at Old Dominion" (1982, with Fran Hassencahl)

== Personal life ==
Hodgson married twice. Her first husband was psychologist Ernest Meyers; they had two children, Richard and Babette; Meyers died in 1957. Her second husband was her ODU English department colleague, Ernest Lloyd Rhodes; they married in 1969, and he died in 2015. She died in 2019, at the age of 93. Her papers are in the archives of Old Dominion University.
