= Hanoch Piven =

Israeli mixed media artist (born 1963)

Hanoch Piven חנוך פיבן
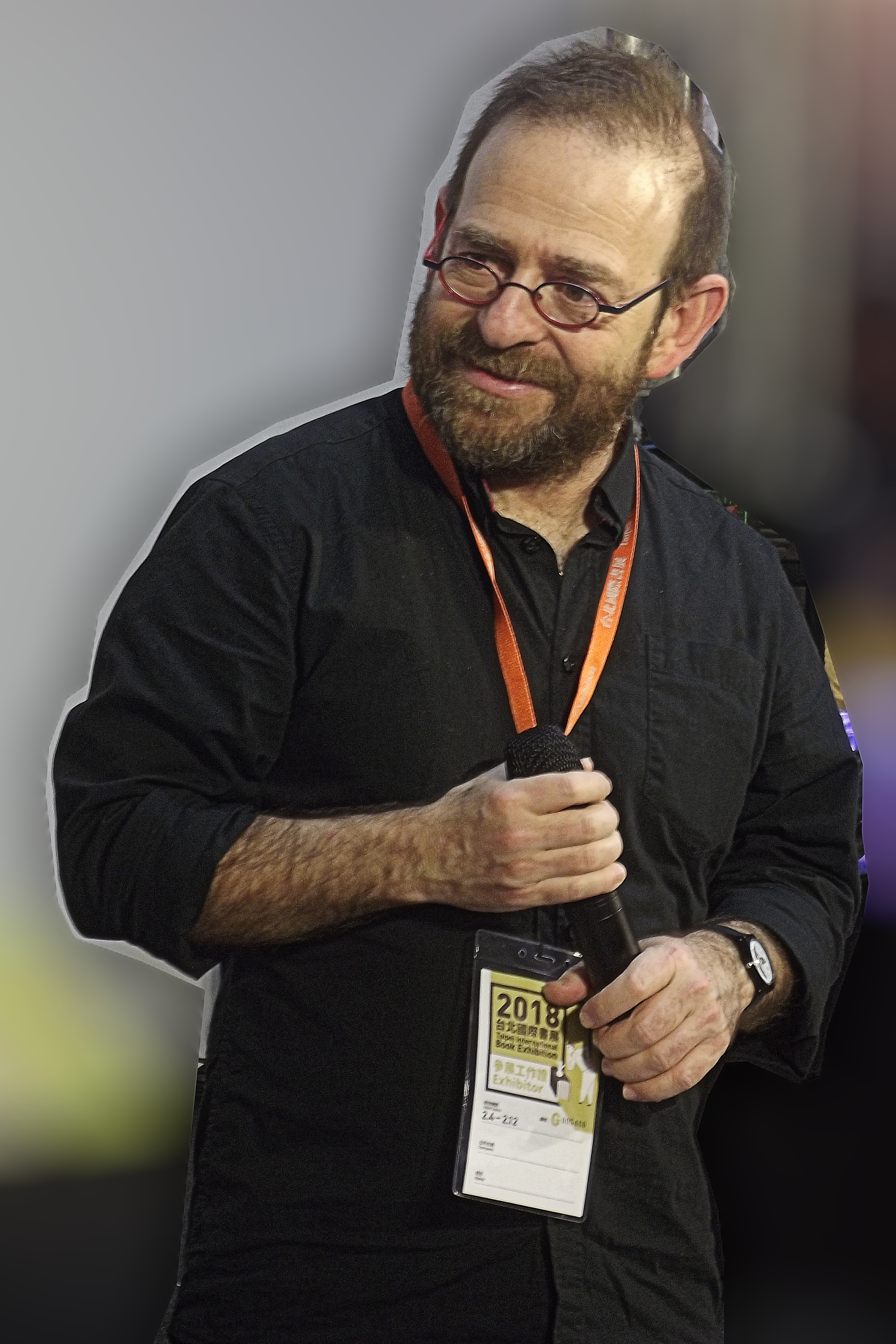
- Hanoch Piven at 2018 Taipei International Book Exhibition
- Born: August 21, 1963 (age 62); Montevideo, Uruguay
- Known for: illustration
- Notable work: Book My Best Friend is as Sharp as a Pencil (2010); Book What Cats are Made of (2008); Book My Dog is As Smelly As Dirty Socks (2007); Book What Athletes are Made of (2006); Book What Presidents Are Made Of (2004); Book The Perfect Purple Feather (2002)

Hanoch Piven (Hebrew: חנוך פיבן; born August 21, 1963, in Montevideo, Uruguay) is an Israeli mixed media artist best known for his celebrity caricatures.

== History ==
Piven was born in Uruguay and moved to Israel with his family at the age of eleven. He grew up in Ramat Gan. He studied at the School of Visual Arts in New York, graduating in 1992. He returned to Israel in 1996 and from 2001 splits his time between Jaffa (Tel Aviv) and Barcelona.

== Artistic career ==
Hanoch Piven is recognized for dimensional collage caricatures. In these, he mixes paint with an assemblage of common objects and scraps of material, including items which might be associated with the subject, as in portraying a celebrity or public figure. (For example, using a microphone as Barbara Streisand's nose.)

Piven's caricatures have appeared in Time, Newsweek, Rolling Stone, The Atlantic Monthly, The Times, and Entertainment Weekly, among other publications. Between the years 1995 and 2001, Hanoch Piven illustrated and wrote a regular monthly column in Haaretz's daily newspaper.

Besides his editorial work for magazines and newspapers, Piven has written and illustrated award winning books for children, among them What Presidents are Made of, named one of the 10 Best Children books of 2004 by Time Magazine, and Dream Big, Laugh Often and More Great Advice from The Bible chosen as a Most Empowering Book of 2023 by Kirkus Reviews.

Piven has also created Television programs for Israel Educational TV and HOP channel in Israel. He has also contributed 20 chapters for the award winning program Una Ma de Contes on Catalonian TV.

Partnering with app developer iMagine machine, Piven developed the app Faces iMake, among them Faces iMake - Right Brain Creativity , which allows for digital collage creation using pictures of every day objects and earned silver in the 2012 Parents' Choice Award.

== Educational career ==
Piven conducts creative workshops in which participants of all ages are inspired to use everyday objects to create self portraits and engage in visual communication.

In 2015 Piven was a Seeds of Peace fellow. During his fellowship, he created an arts education curriculum which explored identity, history, dreams, community, and "the other".

== Awards and recognition ==
- Society of Illustrators Gold Medal (1995)
- Society of Publication Designers Silver Medal
- Art Directors Club Merit Award for Cover Illustration (1996)
- Folio Eddie & Ozzie awards Gold, Best Use of Illustration (2007)
- Time magazine, One of Ten in Best Children's Books Of 2004 (for What Presidents Are Made Of
- Parents' Choice Silver Award for Faces iMake - Right Brain Creativity (2012)
- Parents' Choice Gold Award for Faces iMake ABC (2013)
- Kirkus Reviews Most Empowering Picture Books of 2023 for Dream Big, Laugh Often and More Great Advice from the Bible

== Published works ==
- Dream Big, Laugh Often: And More Great Advice from the Bible (2023) (ISBN 978-0374390105)
- Let's Make Faces (2013) (ISBN 978-1416915324)
- My Best Friend is as Sharp as a Pencil (2010) (ISBN 978-0375853388)
- What Cats are Made Of (2009) (ISBN 978-1416915317)
- My Dog Is As Smelly As Dirty Socks (2007) (ISBN 0-375-84052-4)
- What Athletes Are Made Of (2006) (ISBN 1-416-91002-6)
- The Scary Show of Mo and Jo (2005) (ISBN 978-0762420971)
- What Presidents Are Made Of (2004) (ISBN 0-689-86880-4)
- The Perfect Purple Feather (2002) (ISBN 0-316-76657-7)
- Faces: 78 Portraits from Madonna to the Pope (2002) (ISBN 0-764-92131-2)

== One-man exhibitions ==
- reForm, Herzliya Museum of Contemporary Art, Israel (2025)
- National Gallery, Bangkok, (2014)
- The Czech Center, Prague (2011)
- Plaza de la Concepción, Caceres, Spain (2011)
- The Skirball Cultural Center, Los Angeles (2010)
- Museo de los Niños, Guatemala City, Guatemala (2007)
- Museo de los Niños, Costa Rica (2007)
- Centro Cultura Judia, São Paulo, Brasil (2006)
- Centro Cultural Recoleta, Buenos Aires, Argentina (2004)
- Galeria Latina, Montevideo, Uruguay (2004)
- Haifa Museum, Israel (2000)
- Ashdod Museum, Israel (1998)
- Kibbutz Ashdot Yaakov, Israel (1997)
- School of Visual Arts, New York City (1992)

== See also ==
- Visual arts in Israel
