= What Just Happened (book) =

Poetry collection by Richard Hell

- Author: Richard Hell
- Illustrator: Christopher Wool
- Language: English
- Genre: Poetry
- Publisher: Winter Editions
- Publication date: June 22, 2023
- Media type: Print (paperback)
- Pages: 156
- ISBN: 978-1-959708-00-1

What Just Happened is a 2023 poetry collection by the American writer and musician Richard Hell, with images by the artist Christopher Wool. It was published by Winter Editions on June 22, 2023. What Just Happened was Hell's first book of new poems in about 50 years, most of them written during the COVID-19 pandemic.

== Content ==
The book is divided into three parts. The first gathers new poems, most written during the 2020–2021 pandemic lockdown. The second is "Falling Asleep," an essay on hypnagogia and the nature of reality. The third, "Chronicle," is a sequence of 88 aphoristic notebook entries. Recurring subjects include aging, mortality, memory, and consciousness. Wool contributed black-and-white drawings made for the book.

== Reception ==
Reviewing the collection in The Brooklyn Rail, Raphael Rubinstein wrote that death and aging pervade the poems, attributing the mood more to Hell's own aging than to the pandemic. He described Wool's drawings as line-like forms that punctuate the poems. In Heavy Feather Review, Peter Valente gave the collection a favorable review. The book was also reviewed in NewPages, the Toronto Star, and on the music site Legsville.
