= 1963 in fine arts of the Soviet Union =

The year 1963 was marked by many events that left an imprint on the history of Soviet and Russian fine arts.

== Events ==
- Solo exhibition of works by Vsevolod Bazhenov was opened in the Leningrad Union of Artists.
- All-Union Exhibition «Physical education and Sport in a fine art» was opened in Moscow.
- The Grand Exhibition of Soviet Fine Art was opened in Warsaw, Poland.
- The Anniversary Exhibition of pictures of Abram Arkhipov, to the 100 year from the day of birth, was opened in the halls of Academy of arts in Leningrad.
- Grand Exhibition of works by Samokhvalov Alexander was opened in the Leningrad Union of Artists.
- November 21 — The All-Russian Exhibition of the decorative and applied art was opened in the State Russian Museum in Leningrad. Were exhibited 4200 works of 800 authors.
- November 1 — Entered the sale of the first tickets of the All-Union Artistic Lottery, organized by the Union of Artists of the USSR and Ministry of Culture the USSR. The cost of ticket 50 kop. In 1963 was performed in a lottery 20 thousand art works, among them paintings by Sergey Gerasimov, Aleksei Gritsai, Arkady Plastov, Nikolai Romadin, Martiros Saryan, Vladimir Serov, Vsevolod Bazhenov, Ivan Varichev, Vecheslav Zagonek, Oleg Lomakin, Yevsey Moiseenko, Yaroslav Nikolaev, Victor Reikhet, Ivan Savenko, Vladimir Tokarev, Yuri Tulin, Boris Ugarov, and others. The cost of played off in an Artistic Lottery works of art was from 50 to 1000 roubles.
- Solo exhibition of works devoted Cuba, of Leningrad artist Vladimir Frentz, was opened in the Leningrad Union of Artists. About 50 drawings were presented. As wrote newspapers, an author conducted a few months on Cuba and now works above the series of pictures.

== Deaths ==
- February 27 — Vladimir Konashevich (Russian: Конашевич Владимир Михайлович), Russian Soviet graphic artists, Honored Art worker of Russian Federation (born 1888).
- May 20 — Vasili Rozhdestvensky (Russian: Рождественский Василий Васильевич), Russian Soviet painter and graphic artists (born 1884).
- June 14 — Georgy Motovilov (Russian: Мотовилов Георгий Иванович), Russian Soviet sculptor, Stalin Prize winner (born 1884).
- July 23 — Aleksandr Gerasimov (Russian: Герасимов Александр Михайлович), Russian Soviet painter, People's Artist of the Russian Federation, a president of the Academy of Arts of the USSR, chairman of the Union of Artists of the USSR, Stalin Prize winner (born 1881).
- August 30 — Sofia Dimshits-Tolstaya (Russian: Дымшиц—Толстая Софья Исааковна), Russian Soviet painter and graphic artists (born 1889).
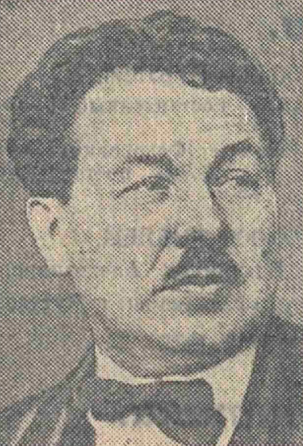
Aleksandr Gerasimov

== See also ==
- List of Russian artists
- List of painters of Leningrad Union of Artists
- Saint Petersburg Union of Artists
- Russian culture

== Sources ==
- Александр Николаевич Самохвалов. Выставка произведений. Каталог. Л, Художник РСФСР, 1963.
- Всесоюзная художественная лотерея 1963 года // Ленинградская правда, 1963, 30 октября.
- Павлов А. Полотна мастера живописи // Вечерний Ленинград, 1963, 5 ноября.
- Вдохновение художника войдёт в каждый дом // Вечерний Ленинград, 1963, 9 ноября.
- Симоновская В. О делах и людях страны // Ленинградская правда, 1963, 14 ноября.
- Симоновская В. Из глины и стекла... // Ленинградская правда, 1963, 22 ноября.
- Щедрая палитра // Ленинградская правда, 1963, 14 ноября.
- В ЛОСХ открылась выставка работ В. Френца, посвящённых Кубе // Вечерний Ленинград, 1963, 21 ноября.
- Григорьева Н. Всесоюзная художественная. // Ленинградская правда, 1963, 26 декабря.
- Всеволод Баженов. Живопись. К 85-летию со дня рождения. Выставка произведений. Каталог. СПб., 1994.
- Artists of Peoples of the USSR. Biography Dictionary. Vol. 1. Moscow, Iskusstvo, 1970.
- Artists of Peoples of the USSR. Biography Dictionary. Vol. 2. Moscow, Iskusstvo, 1972.
- Directory of Members of Union of Artists of USSR. Volume 1,2. Moscow, Soviet Artist Edition, 1979.
- Directory of Members of the Leningrad branch of the Union of Artists of Russian Federation. Leningrad, Khudozhnik RSFSR, 1980.
- Artists of Peoples of the USSR. Biography Dictionary. Vol. 4 Book 1. Moscow, Iskusstvo, 1983.
- Directory of Members of the Leningrad branch of the Union of Artists of Russian Federation. - Leningrad: Khudozhnik RSFSR, 1987.
- Artists of peoples of the USSR. Biography Dictionary. Vol. 4 Book 2. - Saint Petersburg: Academic project humanitarian agency, 1995.
- Link of Times: 1932 - 1997. Artists - Members of Saint Petersburg Union of Artists of Russia. Exhibition catalogue. - Saint Petersburg: Manezh Central Exhibition Hall, 1997.
- Matthew C. Bown. Dictionary of 20th Century Russian and Soviet Painters 1900-1980s. London, Izomar, 1998.
- Vern G. Swanson. Soviet Impressionism. Woodbridge, England, Antique Collectors' Club, 2001.
- Время перемен. Искусство 1960—1985 в Советском Союзе. СПб., Государственный Русский музей, 2006.
- Sergei V. Ivanov. Unknown Socialist Realism. The Leningrad School. Saint-Petersburg, NP-Print Edition, 2007. ISBN 5-901724-21-6, ISBN 978-5-901724-21-7.
- Anniversary Directory graduates of Saint Petersburg State Academic Institute of Painting, Sculpture, and Architecture named after Ilya Repin, Russian Academy of Arts. 1915 - 2005. Saint Petersburg: Pervotsvet Publishing House, 2007.
