= The Druds =

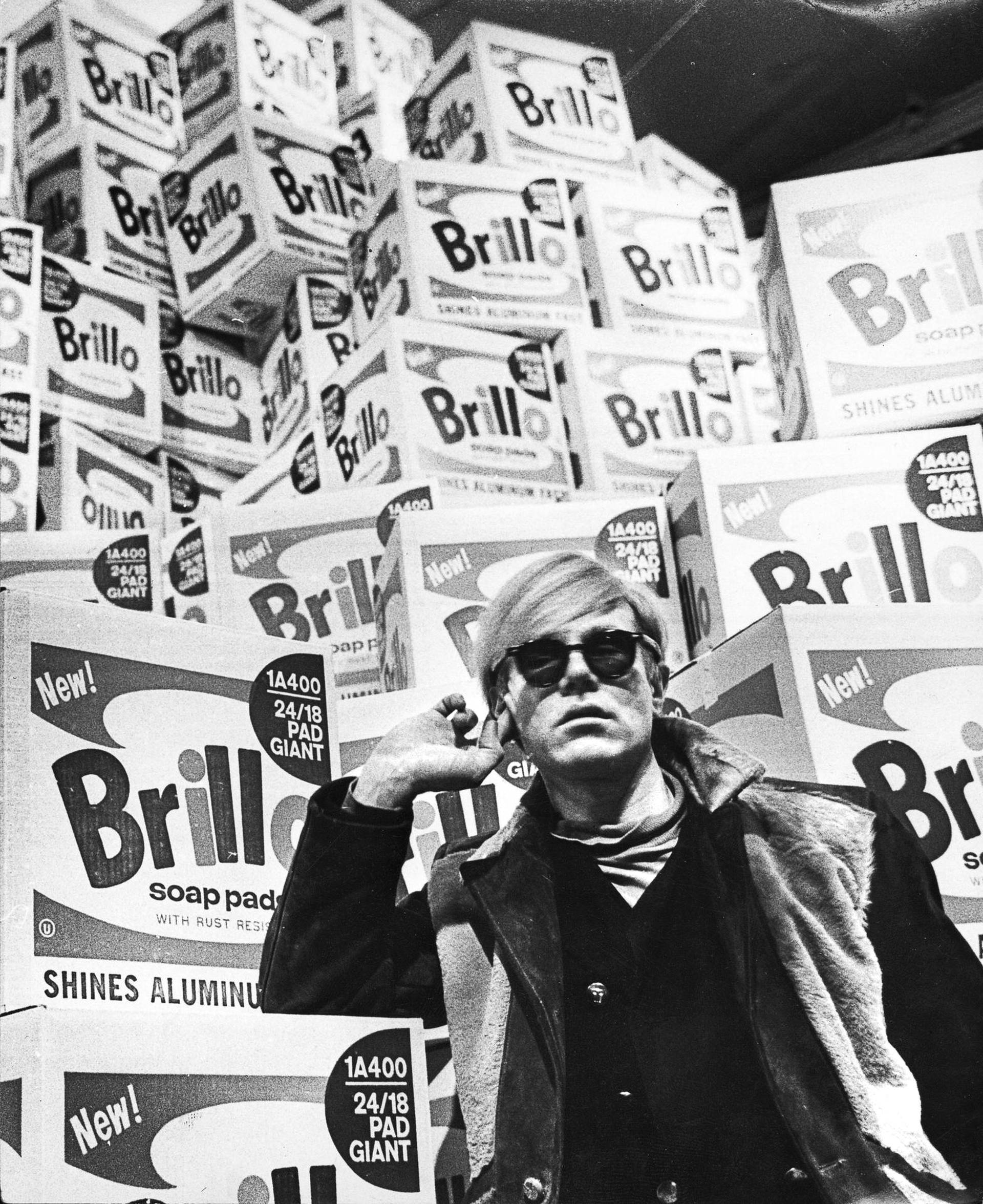
Warhol amid his Brillo Box (1964) sculptures at the Moderna Museet in Stockholm, 1968

The Druds was a short-lived 1963 avant-garde band founded by Andy Warhol, that featured prominent members of the early New York conceptual art community.

== History ==
Minimalist sculptor Walter De Maria played drums, painter Larry Poons played guitar, and minimal composer La Monte Young played the saxophone (but finding it ridiculous, quit after the second rehearsal); artist and poet Patty Mucha (then Patty Oldenburg, as she was married to sculptor Claes Oldenburg) was the lead singer. Jasper Johns wrote neodada lyrics as did Warhol who also occasionally sang. Warhol wrote the songs The Alphabet Song, Movie Stars, Hollywood and Coca-Cola. Happening artists Gloria Graves and Lucas Samaras also sang with the group.

The band's sound has been compared to that of Henry Flynt as well as Lou Reed and John Cale's early band the Primitives, formed prior to the Velvet Underground.
