= Going, Going, Gone (Bob Dylan song) =

Song by Bob Dylan

from the album Planet Waves
- Released: January 17, 1974
- Recorded: November 5, 1973
- Genre: Folk rock
- Length: 3:27
- Label: Asylum
- Songwriter: Bob Dylan
- Producer: Rob Fraboni

"Going, Going, Gone" is a song by Bob Dylan. It was released in 1974 on the album Planet Waves, and also appeared on the 1979 live album Bob Dylan at Budokan. The song is in the key of F major. Dylan is accompanied by The Band.

== Reception ==
Critics have admired the interplay in the song between Dylan's desperate vocal and guitarist Robbie Robertson's lead guitar. Rock critic Tim Riley wrote that "The Band's windup pitch to "Going, Going, Gone" is a wonder of pinpoint ensemble playing: Robertson makes his guitar entrance choke as if a noose had suddenly tightened around its neck", adding that The Band's sympathetic "shaping of the song ... is so perfectly attuned to the bottomed-out quality of Dylan's mood that Robertson's guitar sounds like it's scratching the itch in Dylan's throat".

A 2021 Guardian article included it on a list of "80 Bob Dylan songs everyone should know".

== Personnel ==
- Bob Dylan – acoustic guitar, vocals
- Robbie Robertson – electric guitar
- Rick Danko – bass guitar
- Levon Helm – drums
- Garth Hudson – electronic organ
- Richard Manuel – piano

== Live performances ==
According to his official website, Dylan played the song live 79 times between 1976 and 1979.

== Cover versions ==
- The song was covered by Richard Hell and the Voidoids on their 1982 album Destiny Street.
- Son Volt covered the song on their 1997 EP Switchback.
- A live version by Jerry Garcia appears on his Garcia Plays Dylan Again album.
- Steve Howe covers the song on his Portraits of Bob Dylan album.
- Gregg Allman covers the song on his final album Southern Blood.
- Soul singer Bettye LaVette included the song on her 2018 Dylan covers album Things Have Changed.
- The song was covered by Emma Swift on her 2020 album Blonde on the Tracks.
- Doyle Bramhall II covered the song with Tedeschi-Trucks Band on 2018s Shades.
