= Katherine Faw Morris =

American writer

Katherine Faw (born July 17, 1983), formerly Katherine Faw Morris, is an American writer. Young God, her debut novel, was long-listed for the Flaherty-Dunnan First Novel Prize and named a best book of the year by The Times Literary Supplement, the Houston Chronicle, and BuzzFeed.

In The Guardian, Eimear McBride wrote Young God was "likely to leave even the sturdiest stunned." Elle called it "seductive … Reading Young God is like having a bottle rocket go off in your hands." Faw was born in Wilkesboro, North Carolina. She lives in Brooklyn, New York. In January 2020, it was mentioned on Richard Hell's website that he had begun a relationship with her.

== Books ==
- Young God. Farrar, Straus and Giroux. 2014. ISBN 9780374534233.
- Ultraluminous. MCD Books. 2017. ISBN 9780374279660.
