= Destiny Street =

Studio album by Richard Hell and the Voidoids
- Released: 1982
- Studio: Intergalactic Studios, New York City
- Genre: Art punk, punk rock
- Length: 35:46
- Label: Red Star
- Producer: Alan Betrock

Richard Hell and the Voidoids chronology
Blank Generation (1977)	Destiny Street (1982)

Destiny Street is the second and final studio album by American punk band Richard Hell and the Voidoids. It was released in 1982 by record label Red Star.

== Background ==
Richard Hell is pictured on the front cover with his friend Anne Militello.

== Release ==
Destiny Street was released in 1982 on Red Star Records. Destiny Street was released on CD in 1991 also on Red Star Records.

It was reissued in 1995 by Razor & Tie and again in 2001 by PA label Get Hip Recordings.

== Reception ==
Professional ratings
Review scores
Source	Rating
AllMusic	4/5 stars
Uncut	2/5 stars
Robert Christgau	A−

Robert Christgau gave the album a favorable review, calling it "fuller and jazzier than Blank Generation without any loss of concision".

Robert Palmer of The New York Times hailed Destiny Street as one of the year's best albums, writing that "musically, Destiny Street is a stirring, adventurous record, with Robert Quine turning in a particularly impressive performance on guitar." He praised the original songs, especially "Time," as "rock poetry at its best - insightful, felicitously phrased, and to the point," and described Hell as a contemporary equivalent to Bob Dylan who was also capable of writing rock poetry as "compact and crystal-clear as the songs of Mr. Dylan's early idols, Smokey Robinson and Chuck Berry."

In a retrospective assessment, Mark Deming of AllMusic called it "looser and more spontaneous than Hell's debut, but it's just as smart and every bit as powerful, and it's a more-than-worthy follow-up" that "[showed Hell had] actually grown since his debut".

== Destiny Street Repaired (2009) ==
Hell was openly dissatisfied with the sound of Destiny Street, later describing it as "a morass of trebly multi-guitar blare." Years later, when it was still legally owned by Marty Thau and his label Red Star, Hell tried to remix Destiny Street from the original 24-track session tapes, but he was told that they had been lost. Sometime in the early 2000s, Hell discovered a cassette tape from 1981 that contained the album's basic rhythm tracks (drums, bass and two rhythm guitars). After Hell acquired the rights to Destiny Street in 2005, he eventually decided to delete the album and replace it with a new and clearer version that mixed the rhythm tracks from the cassette tapes with newly recorded vocals and guitar solos. Quine had already died in 2004 and Naux died in 2009, so Hell enlisted Marc Ribot and Bill Frisell along with Ivan Julian to record the new guitar solos. The final result was released in 2009 as Destiny Street Repaired, and it was available only through its online label Insound and Hell's own website.

== Destiny Street Remixed (2021) ==
In 2019, Hell revisited Destiny Street again when three of the four original 24-track session tapes were finally located. With the help of Nick Zinner, the guitarist for the Yeah Yeah Yeahs, Hell mixed a brand-new version of the album using the original 24-track tapes. (Hell also decided to mix three songs using the session tapes for Destiny Street Repaired as the original 24-track tape containing those songs have yet to be recovered.) The final result was released in 2021 as Destiny Street Remixed by Omnivore Recordings, both as a standalone vinyl release and as a deluxe set that contained newly remastered editions of the original mix and Destiny Street Repaired alongside Destiny Street Remixed and a selection of demos and rarities.

== Track listing ==
All tracks are written by Richard Hell, except as indicated.

Side A
No.	Title	Writer(s)	Length
1.	"The Kid with the Replaceable Head"		2:24
2.	"You Gotta Move"	Ray Davies	2:36
3.	"Going Going Gone"	Bob Dylan	2:34
4.	"Lowest Common Dominator"		2:23
5.	"Downtown at Dawn"		5:59

Side B
No.	Title	Writer(s)	Length
6.	"Time"		3:33
7.	"I Can Only Give You Everything"	Phil Coulter, Tommy Scott	3:57
8.	"Ignore that Door"	Hell, Ivan Julian, Robert Quine	3:13
9.	"Staring in Her Eyes"		4:20
10.	"Destiny Street"	Hell, Fred Maher, Naux, Robert Quine	4:40

== Personnel ==
Richard Hell and the Voidoids

- Richard Hell – bass guitar, vocals
- Robert Quine – guitar
- Naux (Juan Maciel) – guitar
- Fred Maher – drums

Technical

- Marty Thau – executive producer
- Jay Burnett – engineer
- Murray Brenman – design
- Roberta Bayley – photography
