= Go Now (novel) =

Novel by Richard Hell

- Author: Richard Hell
- Language: English
- Genre: Picaresque, road novel
- Publisher: Scribner (US); Fourth Estate (UK)
- Publication date: June 1996
- Publication place: United States
- Media type: Print (hardcover and paperback)
- Pages: 175
- ISBN: 978-0-684-82234-1
- Followed by: Godlike (2005)

Go Now is the 1996 debut novel by the American writer and musician Richard Hell. Published in the United States by Scribner and in the United Kingdom by Fourth Estate, the novel is narrated by Billy Mud, a burnt-out punk rock musician and heroin addict who is hired by an admirer to drive a 1957 DeSoto Adventurer across the United States with his former girlfriend, the French photographer Chrissa, and to produce a book from the trip. The story is set in 1980 and was drawn in part from Hell's own experiences, including his relationship with Lizzy Mercier Descloux.

== Plot ==
Billy Mud is a heroin-addicted New York rock musician past his commercial prime, fronting a band led by a guitarist named Copley. His longtime benefactor, a rock-and-roll entrepreneur named Jack, commissions him to drive a vintage DeSoto from California to New York with his ex-lover Chrissa, a French photographer; she is to take pictures, Mud is to keep a notebook, and the two are to produce a book from the journey. Mud uses the trip as a pretext both to revive the relationship and to attempt to outrun his drug habit.

The trip does not unfold as planned. Mud detoxes briefly in Reno before scoring again in Denver, and the pair detour to his hometown of Lexington, Kentucky, where they stay with Mud's aunt. After Chrissa discovers that Mud has seduced his aunt, she leaves on a plane back to New York and the project collapses.

== Background and publication ==
Hell, best known at the time as a founding figure of the New York punk rock scene with Television, The Heartbreakers, and Richard Hell and the Voidoids, had been working toward longer prose fiction since the 1970s. His short novella The Voidoid had been written in 1973 and published in 1993 by CodeX in the United Kingdom. Go Now was his first full-length novel and his first book from a major trade publisher. The hardcover edition was published by Scribner in June 1996, with a UK edition from Fourth Estate the same year; Scribner issued a paperback edition in June 1997.

The novel attracted a promotional endorsement from the science-fiction writer William Gibson, who described it in publisher's copy as deserving of the widest possible audience. Hell's manuscript drafts and publication materials for the novel are held in the Richard Hell Papers at the Fales Library of New York University.

== Reception ==
Reviews of Go Now appeared in a range of trade and general-interest outlets. Publishers Weekly and Kirkus Reviews both reviewed the novel in 1996; Kirkus was sharply negative, comparing Hell's prose unfavorably to Patti Smith's and dismissing the book's stream-of-consciousness passages as incoherent. Library Journal was mixed; the reviewer Doris Lynch of the Monroe County Public Library in Bloomington, Indiana, praised Hell's eye for place and the intelligence of the narrator's voice but criticized the novel's relentless drug content, recommending it only for specialized collections.

Coverage in general-interest and music outlets was warmer. Writing in The Nation, Laurie Stone compared the novel's tone to Samuel Beckett and the prose to that of William S. Burroughs, while invoking Franz Kafka and Bartleby as touchstones for the narrator's stance. The Village Voice described it as a junkie novel written from inside its narrator's mind, with sentences forged out of hard-won insights into loneliness and self-disgust. Mim Udovitch, in New York Magazine, drew a comparison to Irvine Welsh's Trainspotting.USA Today praised the novel's clarity and the bleak power of its climax, and the Times Literary Supplement commended the verve of Hell's writing while comparing his shifts of register to Ernest Hemingway, Henry Miller, and P. J. O'Rourke. James Marshall, writing in High Times, called Go Now a junkie literary masterpiece and ranked it above Jim Carroll's prose. BookPage focused on the moral ambiguity of the narrator, arguing that the power of Hell's language lay in his ability to make Mud both seductive and repellent. The San Jose Mercury News framed the novel as a debt to Mark Twain's Huckleberry Finn as much as to Hunter S. Thompson. The British music weekly New Musical Express described the book in starkly negative terms as a glimpse into the psyche of a self-destructive addict.

== Relationship to Hell's later work ==
Hell has said that the critical reception of Go Now shaped the form of his second novel, Godlike (2005); in particular, he has cited readers' tendency to treat Go Now as autofiction rather than as fiction as one of the impulses behind the more formally distanced approach of the later book.
