= Blank Generation (song) =

- EP cover

Song by Richard Hell and the Voidoids

from the EP Another World
- Released: 1977
- Recorded: 1976
- Genre: Punk rock; art punk; proto-punk
- Length: 2:45
- Label: Sire
- Songwriter: Richard Hell

"Blank Generation" is the title track of Richard Hell and the Voidoids' 1977 debut album Blank Generation. A rewrite of Bob McFadden and Rod McKuen's 1959 record "The Beat Generation", Richard Hell wrote the new lyrics during his time with the band Television, and performed it live with another band, the Heartbreakers.

== Releases ==
"Blank Generation" was previously released on the Another World EP in 1976. Other versions of the punk classic were available as demos and on one 1975 limited-edition pressing as well.

An earlier live recording by the Heartbreakers, recorded at CBGB on July 7, 1975, appeared on the What Goes Around... album. Demo recordings of the song also have survived.

A live March 1974 recording at CBGB with Television can be found on Spurts: The Richard Hell Story.

== Legacy ==
Malcolm McLaren claimed that the Sex Pistols' song "Pretty Vacant" was directly inspired by "Blank Generation".

In 2000, "Blank Generation" was heavily sampled on rapper Amil's track "Get Down" on her album All Money Is Legal.

== In popular culture ==
The song was featured at the end of the sixth episode of the Syfy television show Happy!. The song appears in season 3, episode 3 of Sex Education.

In 2024, "Blank Generation" was featured in a scene in The Exorcism.
