= Godlike (novel) =

Novel by Richard Hell

- NYRB Classics cover of Godlike
- Author: Richard Hell
- Cover artist: Christopher Wool (2005 edition, cover photograph)
- Language: English
- Genre: Literary fiction
- Publisher: Akashic Books (Little House on the Bowery)
- Publication date: July 2005
- Publication place: United States
- Media type: Print (paperback)
- Pages: 141
- ISBN: 978-1-888451-77-1
- Preceded by: Go Now (1996)

Godlike is a 2005 novel by the American writer and musician Richard Hell. Originally published by Akashic Books as part of the Little House on the Bowery series edited by Dennis Cooper, Godlike was reissued in February 2026 by NYRB Classics with a new afterword by the writer and curator Raymond Foye. The novel transposes the romantic and creative relationship between the 19th-century French poets Arthur Rimbaud and Paul Verlaine to the East Village poetry scene of early-1970s New York, where it follows the affair between the twenty-seven-year-old poet Paul Vaughn and a sixteen-year-old newcomer, R.T. Wode.

== Plot ==
The narrator, Paul Vaughn, is a poet confined to a psychiatric hospital, where his editor has encouraged him to fill a series of notebooks. The notebooks, which form the body of the novel, recount his consuming affair more than two decades earlier with R.T. Wode (referred to as "T."), a charismatic and deliberately provocative sixteen-year-old poet newly arrived in the city. Married and already a respected figure in the downtown scene, Paul becomes obsessed with T.; the two drop acid, crash parties, attend readings, write, and wander Manhattan together before the relationship disintegrates.

The narrative alternates between first-person stream of consciousness narrative and a more measured third-person voice, both of which return to the present-tense frame of Vaughn's hospital bed. Interpolated throughout the prose are letters, journal entries, essay fragments, and poems attributed to the characters, including pieces that Hell composed as fictional equivalents of work by Frank O'Hara, attributed within the novel to a character modeled on the poet Ted Berrigan.

== Background and composition ==
Hell has described Godlike as a deliberate response to readers who had treated his first novel, Go Now (1996), as autofiction rather than as fiction. He worked on the manuscript for approximately five years. The relationship between Arthur Rimbaud and Paul Verlaine served as a structural pattern for the plot, but at Hell's request, the original publisher did not foreground the parallel. The earliest reviewers were not told of it and did not refer to it. Hell has cited his own long association with Rimbaud, and his musical and poetic partnership in the 1970s with Tom Verlaine, as factors that made the conceit a tacit one.

The novel is steeped in references to the New York School of poets, including Ted Berrigan, Frank O'Hara, James Schuyler, John Ashbery, Ron Padgett, and Edwin Denby, and depicts the milieu around St. Mark's Church-in-the-Bowery that Hell encountered as a teenager.

== Publication history ==
After Hell's literary agent, Betsy Lerner, was unable to place the manuscript with a major trade publisher, the book was acquired by Akashic Books' founder Johnny Temple for inclusion in Dennis Cooper's Little House on the Bowery imprint. It was published in July 2005 with a cover photograph by the artist Christopher Wool.

Godlike was long out of print before being selected for reissue by NYRB Classics, edited by Edwin Frank, in February 2026. The new edition includes an afterword by Raymond Foye together with supplemental notes.

== Reception ==
=== Original edition (2005) ===
Publishers Weekly reviewed the Akashic edition in 2005, characterizing the book as a non-mainstream work that would resonate with readers interested in the intersection of poetry, downtown bohemia, and sexuality. The poet and art critic Barry Schwabsky published an extended critical appreciation of the novel in 2006 on Eileen Tabios's blog Galatea's Resurrection; Schwabsky republished and expanded the piece on Substack in 2026 to coincide with the reissue.

=== NYRB Classics reissue (2026) ===
The 2026 reissue prompted a fresh wave of coverage. Writing in The Brooklyn Rail, the reviewer praised the novel's frank treatment of bohemian values and described its prose as fluid and playful, arguing that the book can be read in a single sitting and that Hell sustains an edgy attitude without becoming sentimental. Michael Londra, reviewing the reissue for The Arts Fuse, called Godlike Hell's best book and read it as a reworking of Rimbaud's A Season in Hell in the voice of New York's downtown 1970s.

Interview published a feature conversation between Hell and Chris Molnar tied to the reissue, and Protean Magazine ran an extended interview by Andrew Holter focused on the book's composition and its relationship to Rimbaud and Verlaine. Hell appeared on the Los Angeles Review of Books podcast to discuss the reissue, and read from the novel on the New York Review of Books podcast Private Life in conversation with Jarrett Earnest.
