= Beauty and Sadness (EP) =

EP by The Smithereens
- Released: June 1983
- Recorded: 1982–1983
- Studio: Record Plant, NYC
- Genre: Power pop; post-punk
- Length: 17:41
- Label: Little Ricky Records; Enigma; Capitol
- Producer: Alan Betrock

The Smithereens chronology
Girls About Town (1980)	Beauty and Sadness (1983)	Especially for You (1986)

Professional ratings
Review scores
Source	Rating
Allmusic	2.5/5 stars
Rolling Stone	4/5 stars

Beauty and Sadness is the second EP by The Smithereens, released in June 1983 on Little Ricky Records.

== Background ==
For Beauty and Sadness, The Smithereens enlisted producer Alan Betrock and engineer James A. Ball to handle the production at New York's Record Plant. Betrock had previously worked on early efforts by Blondie and Marshall Crenshaw, while Ball's credits included albums by John Lennon and The Go-Go's.

The first session took place on October 29, 1982, where the band completed the basic tracks and some overdubs for the title track. The band then played gigs to finance the completion of an EP and regrouped in January 1983 to record three more songs. Over several months' time the band played more gigs to pay for studio time until the EP was completed. With some spare studio time the title track was remixed into an extended version for fun.

Beauty and Sadness was released in the summer of 1983 on Little Ricky Records, an offshoot of the record mail order company Disques Du Monde. It was originally released in a limited edition of 3000 copies that soon sold out.

== Reissues ==
Beauty and Sadness was remixed by Ed Stasium in November 1987 and reissued by Enigma in 1988 with one track removed from the track listing and a different track order. It was reissued again in 1992 by Capitol Records with the 1988 remix and the original track listing.

== Review ==
The Smithereens showed a lot of growth in their sound, thanks to playing around the New Jersey area as well as serving as the backing band for Otis Blackwell. The disc showed off their developing "Beatles meets AC/DC" style, particularly in the title track, an homage to The Beatles' "Tomorrow Never Knows."

The Beauty and Sadness EP received a four-star rating from Rolling Stone magazine.

== Track listing ==
All tracks are written by Pat DiNizio, except where noted.

No.	Title	Writer(s)	Length
1.	"Tracey's World"		3:55
2.	"Much Too Much"	DiNizio, Dennis Diken	2:22
3.	"Some Other Guy"		2:42
4.	"Beauty and Sadness"		3:22
5.	"Beauty and Sadness (Instrumental Mix)"		5:02

1988 Enigma reissue track listing
No.	Title	Writer(s)	Length
1.	"Beauty and Sadness"		3:27
2.	"Some Other Guy"		2:46
3.	"Tracey's World"		4:00
4.	"Much Too Much"	DiNizio, Diken	2:22

== Personnel ==
Adapted from the album's liner notes.

The Smithereens

- Pat DiNizio – vocals, guitar, harmonica
- Jim Babjak – guitar
- Dennis Diken – drums, percussion, vocals
- Mike Mesaros – bass

Production

- Alan Betrock – production
- James A. Ball – engineering, mixing
- Arthur K. Miller – art direction, design
- Brad Weiss – photography
- Ed Stasium – remixing
