= Neon Boys =

American proto-punk band

The Neon Boys
- Origin: New York, New York, United States
- Genres: Proto-punk; punk rock
- Years active: 1972–1973
- Label: Shake
- Past members: Richard Hell; Tom Verlaine; Billy Ficca

The Neon Boys were a short lived New York City proto-punk band, composed of Tom Verlaine, Richard Hell and Billy Ficca. The trio later went on to form the influential rock band Television in 1973; Richard Hell also went on to form the influential punk bands the Heartbreakers and Richard Hell and the Voidoids.

== Background ==
Two Neon Boys' recordings, "That's All I Know (Right Now)" and "Love Comes In Spurts," were released by Shake Records on a 1980 EP, backed with two songs by Richard Hell and the Voidoids. The same songs were re-released in 1991 by Overground Records with the addition of one more Neon Boys song, "High Heeled Wheels."

== History ==
Information about the Neon Boys includes oral histories, newspaper and magazine articles, and narratives written by the band members themselves. As such, there may be some discrepancies in issues like band formation dates and songs recorded. For example, according to The A to Z of Alternative Music, only two songs were recorded by the Neon Boys. This is contradicted by Genius that lists four songs. The fact that the band never performed a live show adds to the confusion.

Tom Verlaine and Richard Hell were schoolmates and friends, according to Legs McNeil's book Please Kill Me. The two met attending the Sanford School, a private boarding institution in Wilmington, DE. Richard Hell left school and moved to New York City in 1966. When interviewed, Hell has described running away from home as "one of his favorite things to do." This may be emblematic of a desire for adventure and taking chances—a trait that eventually ran through the music of the Neon Boys. Tom Verlaine joined Hell in New York in the late sixties. Additional discrepancies in the band's timeline can be seen in a New York Times article that has Verlaine arriving in 1968. An oral history written by Marky Ramone does not have either Hell or Verlaine coming to New York until 1969. Billy Ficca, who had previously played in a band with Verlaine, also relocated to New York.

Eventually, both Hell and Verlaine would come to work in the bookstore, Cinemabilia where they befriended the store's manager Terry Ork, who had extensive connections to Andy Warhol and other assorted members of the New York music scene. Ork encouraged Verlaine and Hell to start a band and offered them rehearsal space. Richard Lloyd joined the band on Ork's suggestion. It is at this point, with a change in band line up, that the Neon Boys reformed as Television.

== Discography ==
EPs's

- "Time"/"Don't Die"/"That's All I Know (Right Now)"/"Love Comes In Spurts" (1980; 7")
- "Time"/"Don't Die"/"That's All I Know (Right Now)"/"Love Comes In Spurts"/"High Heeled Wheels" (1991)
