= Ivan Julian =

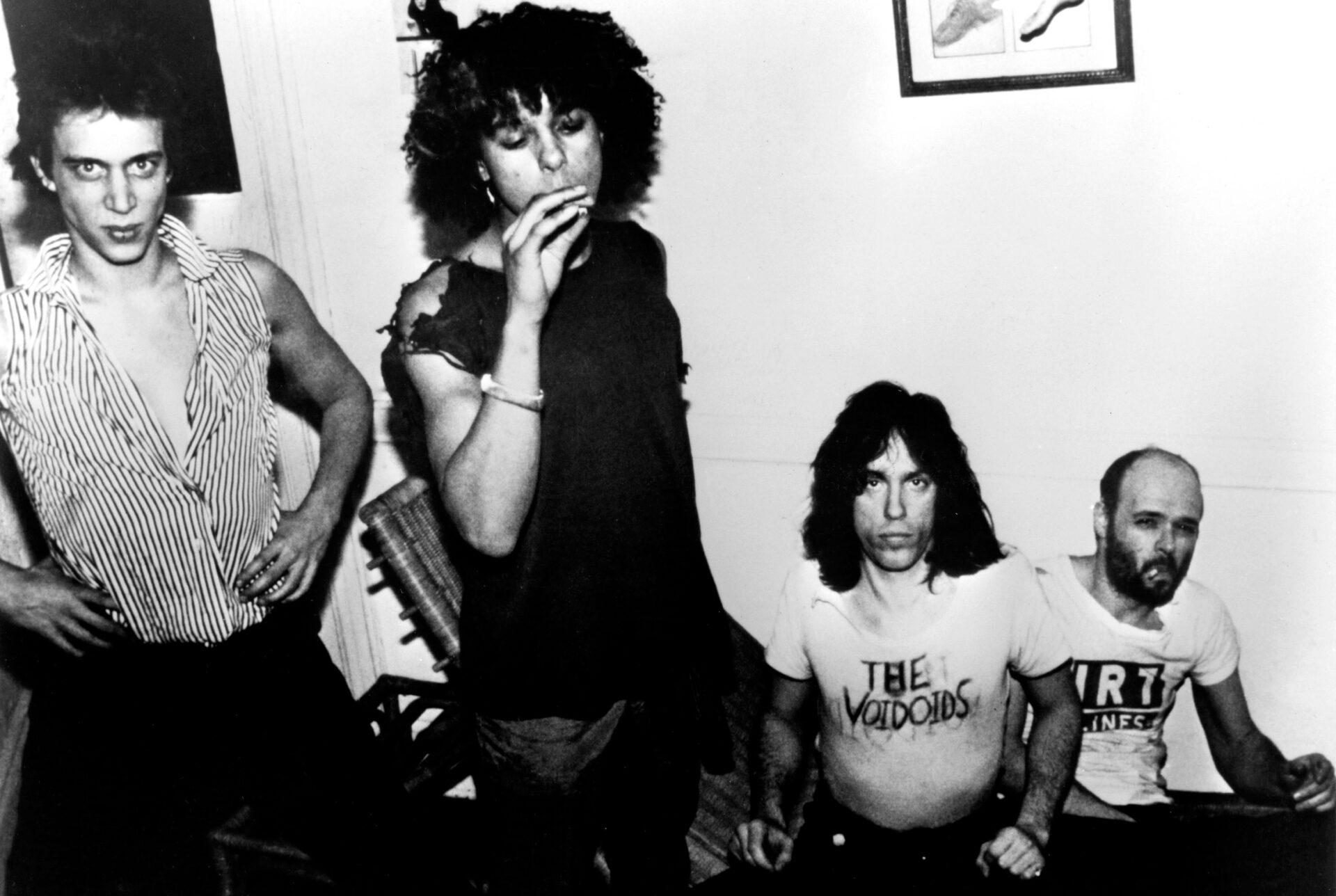
- Julian (second from left) as part of Richard Hell and the Voidoids in 1977

Background information
- Born: June 26, 1955 (age 71); Washington, D.C.
- Genres: Punk rock; rock and roll
- Occupations: Musician; singer; songwriter; producer; audio engineer
- Instruments: Guitar; piano; vocals
- Labels: Sire; Radar; Warner Bros.; Pravda

Ivan Julian (born June 26, 1955) is a guitarist, singer-songwriter, and founding member of Richard Hell and the Voidoids and Lovelies. He has also performed with The Isley Brothers, The Clash, Matthew Sweet, The Bongos, Richard Barone, and Shriekback, Jeremy Toback.

== Biography ==
=== Early life and career ===
Julian was inspired after seeing Jimi Hendrix play and the freedom of expression that he represented. Julian apparently went home and burned his Chuck Taylor shoes in his backyard - a symbolic gesture against conformity.

The child of a Navy officer, Julian spent his formative years moving a great deal, spending time in Haiti and Cuba before the family settled in Washington D.C. He enjoyed spending time alone and was an avid reader of books by Edgar Allan Poe and Ovid. He also enjoyed putting his own thoughts in writing.

When he was 13, Julian sang in a Led Zeppelin cover band, which led him to pick up the guitar at 14. Prior to this, he also studied bassoon and saxophone. He spent his high school years as a part-time student in a college program studying music theory. And then at the age of 17, Julian toured the United Kingdom, Switzerland and the former Yugoslavia as a member of The Foundations, known for hits like "Build Me Up Buttercup" and "Baby Now That I Found You”.

=== The Voidoids, Blank Generation ===
In 1976 Julian returned to the U.S. to New York, where he was a founding member of the seminal Punk/ New Wave group Richard Hell and the Voidoids. Soon after the band recorded an EP that was heralded by the Village Voice as one of the best records of the year. Later that year they were signed to Sire/Warner Brothers, and with the band and Richard Gottehrer producing came the Blank Generation LP. This album set a new standard for a whole generation of guitar players. Two of Julian's songs (co-written with Richard Hell), "Liars Beware" and "Betrayal Takes Two" appear on side one. The reviewers gave the album high accolades and singled out the guitar work praising its merit. The album stands the test of time and today is still considered among the quintessential records of that period.

=== The Outsets (1980–85) ===
Julian formed The Outsets just after the breakup of Richard Hell and the Voidoids in 1980. He remembered seeing Vinny DeNunzio of The Feelies playing with Richard Lloyd's band and being impressed. As it turned out, Vinny was ready for a change. As such, they started holding auditions for bass and the other guitar. When the word got out, Fred Smith (Television, Blondie), Ted Niceley (producer, Fugazi and Girls vs. Boys), and Tommy Keene were among those that came to play. Niceley and Keene had both played in (the) Razz, a D.C. band whose members were friends with Julian.

Eventually the positions were filled by Bob Albertson on bass and Simon Chardiet on guitar. Soon after the band went into rehearsals and prepared for live dates at CBGB's and Max's Kansas City. At this point there were more venues opening up such as the Mudd Club, Danceteria catering to a new minimal, percussive style of music and Ivan wanted to be part of it. The plan was to venture out with fresh ideas and to new places. As such, the first gig was booked at Tier 3, a performance space in Soho.

After several months the band was signed to Contender Records and released their first single, "I'm Searchin' For You" b/w "Fever". Much has been made of the misprint on the label that incorrectly list the publishing rights for the B side. As a result, the record company corrected the mistake after the first pressing which has made it somewhat of a collector's item. The songs on The Punk/Funk Voodoo Collection were recorded in the basement studio of Giorgio Gomelsky, Yardbirds producer and early manager of the Rolling Stones. He persuaded Ivan Julian and the band to explore sounds outside of the boundaries of American pop music, most notably Fela Kuti. The music and the lyrics resound with the rough and tumble immediacy of East Village New York in the early 1980s. Included as bonus tracks are remastered versions of The Outsets' first single, which was originally released as a 45 on Contender records.

Garland Jeffreys approached Ivan and offered to produce The Outsets forthcoming EP "The Ice Man", which also involved Bob Clearmountain as engineer. During this time he also recorded with Tomas Donker from Defunkt, Afrika Bambaataa and Bernie Worrell of Parliament/Funkadelic fame. Originally released in the U.S. on Plexus Records, Marsha Sardy played keyboards on the bonus tracks. Sardy also played with The Julian.

=== 1988: Lovelies ===
Julian formed a group called Lovelies which included his then-wife, former Bush Tetras vocalist Cynthia Sley, in 1988. Mad Orphan (an early version of the band was called The Mad Orphans) is their only release. This release is characterized by percussive downtown NYC post-punk.

=== The Clash, Shriekback, Matthew Sweet and producer ===
When The Clash were at Electric Lady Studios recording their Sandinista! LP, Mick Jones and Joe Strummer wanted Julian to join them in the studio but he was touring with his band, The Outsets. Upon his return, he recorded with them. Julian also helped the band develop their single "The Call Up".

Julian joined the touring lineup of The English band Shriekback for two tours of North America and Europe. Shriekback was founded by bassist Dave Allen from members of his band Gang of Four with Barry Andrews, formerly of XTC.

Julian's had this to say about being compared to Hendrix: "I never wanted to emulate him because he is someone that can't be touched, but I am honoured that people would say that about me." With his influences being such notable figures as Charlie Parker, Albert Ayler and Charlie Christian it is no wonder that he has developed a distinct style all his own. Julian states, "There is a piece of their soul in every note they play." During most of the 1990s, Julian recorded and toured the world with Matthew Sweet as lead guitarist. This collaboration awarded him three Gold Record Awards.

Julian continues to write and produce music at his analog tape/digital recording studio, NY HED. This was where he has produced the last two The Fleshtones LPs, and mastered Five Dollar Priest among others.

=== Recovery from cancer ===
After Julian was diagnosed with Stage III gastrointestinal cancer in 2015, a two-day benefit concert was staged for him at City Winery in New York. The musicians who performed included Debbie Harry, Thurston Moore, and Matthew Sweet. Declared cancer-free in 2016, Julian played a comeback show at Bell House in Brooklyn. In March 2020, it was announced that his cancer had returned. A GoFundMe fundraiser was started to cover $75,000 in medical bills.
