= Michael Lobel =

Art historian

- Education: Ph.D., History of Art, Yale University M.Phil., History of Art, Yale University M.A., History of Art, Yale University B.A., Studio Art, Wesleyan University
- Occupation: Art Historian
- Employer: Hunter College

Michael Lobel is an art historian and critic. He is a professor at Hunter College and The Graduate Center, CUNY. Lobel has taught at Bard College and SUNY Purchase. He was awarded the 28th Annual Eldredge Prize by the Smithsonian American Art Museum for his book John Sloan: Drawing on Illustration in 2016. Lobel attended Wesleyan University and received his PhD in art history from Yale University.

Lobel has received grants and fellowships from the Henry Luce Foundation/American Council of Learned Societies, the Dedalus Foundation, the Rockwell Center for American Visual Studies, and the Getty Research Institute. In 2012, he was the Terra Foundation Visiting Professor at the Institut National d’Histoire de l’Art in Paris. He is a regular contributor to exhibition catalogues and to such publications as Artforum, Art in America, and Art Bulletin.

== Works ==
- Image Duplicator: Roy Lichtenstein and the Emergence of Pop Art (Yale University Press, 2002).
- James Rosenquist: Pop Art, Politics and History in the 1960s (University of California Press, 2010).
- John Sloan: Drawing on Illustration (Yale University Press, 2014).
