= Baseball Manager =

Painting by Roy Lichtenstein

- Artist: Roy Lichtenstein
- Year: 1963
- Medium: Magna on canvas
- Dimensions: 170 cm × 140 cm (68 in × 56 in)
- Location: Marlins Park; Miami, Florida

Baseball Manager is a 1963 pop art painting by Roy Lichtenstein. The magna on canvas measures 68 x 56 inches. The painting is visible at Marlins Park (Promenade Level, Section 19), located in Miami, Florida.

== See also ==
- 1963 in art
