= Richard Hell =

American singer, songwriter, bass guitarist and writer (born 1949)

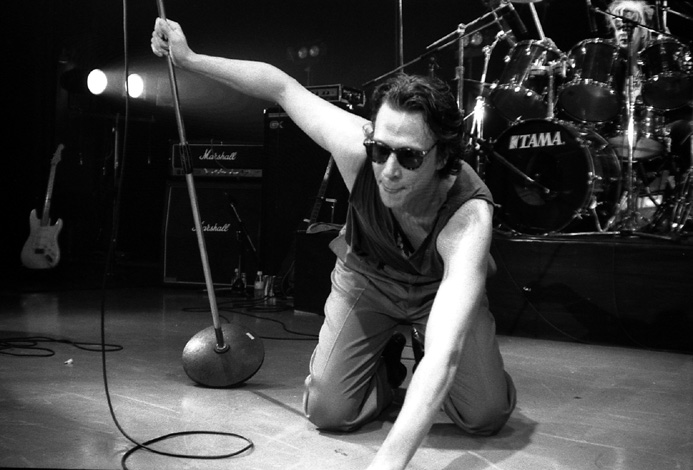
- Hell performing at Club Citta in Kawasaki, Japan, early 1990s

Background information
- Born: Richard Lester Meyers; October 2, 1949 (age 77); Lexington, Kentucky
- Genres: Punk rock; rock and roll; alternative rock
- Occupations: Musician; singer; songwriter; writer
- Instruments: Vocals; bass guitar
- Years active: 1972–present
- Labels: Sire; Red Star; Matador; Rhino
- Formerly of: Richard Hell and the Voidoids; Neon Boys; Television; The Heartbreakers; Dim Stars
- Website: www.richardhell.com

Richard Lester Meyers (born October 2, 1949), better known by his stage name Richard Hell, is an American singer, songwriter, bassist and writer.

Hell was in several important early punk rock bands, including Neon Boys, Television, and the Heartbreakers, after which he formed Richard Hell & the Voidoids. Their 1977 album Blank Generation influenced many other punk bands. Its title track was named "One of the 500 Songs That Shaped Rock" by music writers in the Rock and Roll Hall of Fame listing and is ranked as one of the all-time Top 10 punk songs by a 2006 poll of original British punk figures, as reported in the Rough Guide to Punk.

Since the late 1980s, Hell has devoted himself primarily to writing, publishing two novels and several other books. He was the film critic for BlackBook magazine from 2004 to 2006.

== Biography ==
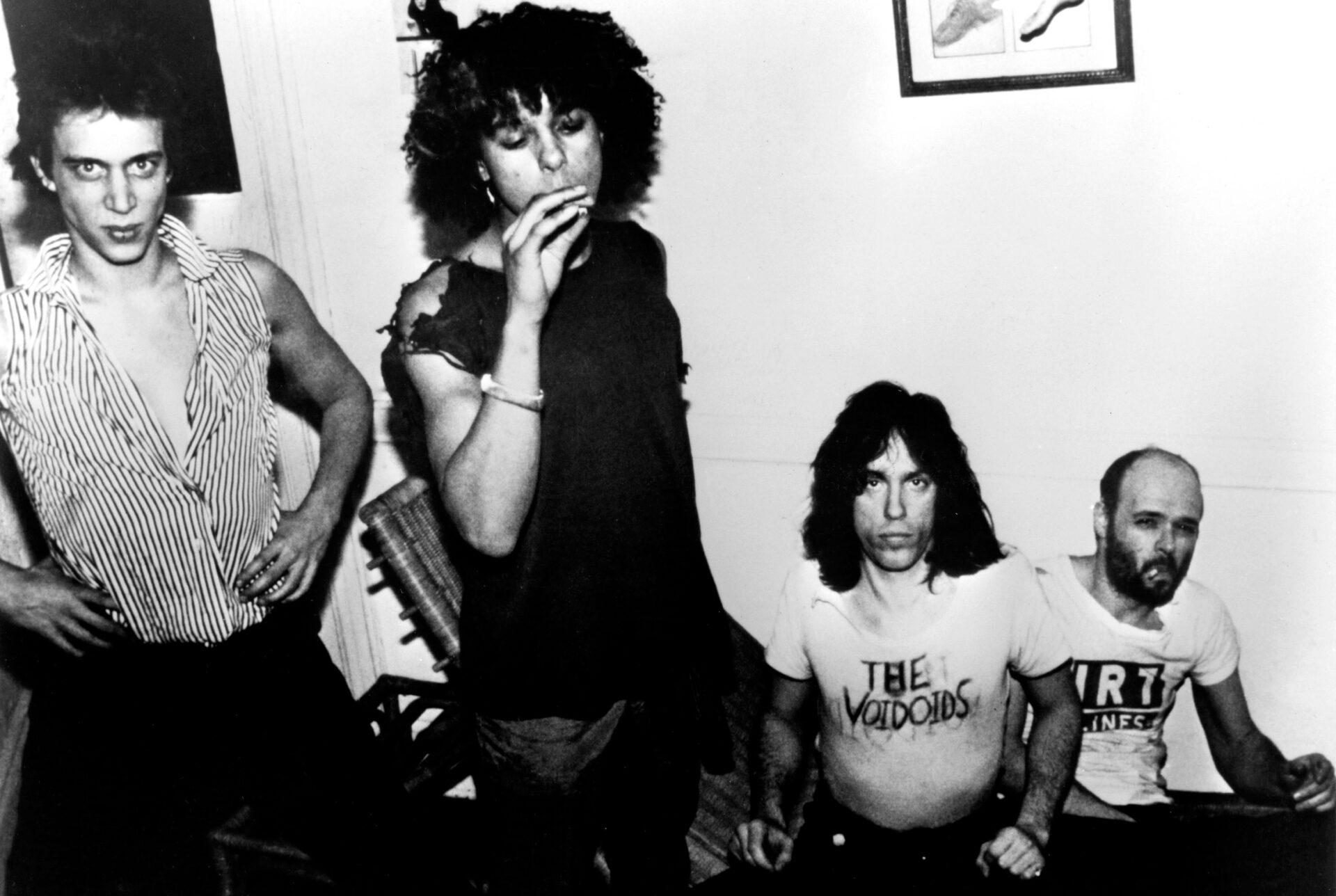
The punk band Richard Hell and the Voidoids in a 1977 press photo. (L-R): Richard Hell, Ivan Julian, Marc Bell (Marky Ramone), and Robert Quine

=== Early life and career ===
Richard Lester Meyers was born in Lexington, Kentucky, in 1949. His father was Jewish, and an experimental psychologist researching animal behavior. He died when Hell was seven years old. Hell was then raised by his mother, Carolyn H. Rhodes, who came from Welsh and English ancestry. After her husband's death, she returned to school and became a professor.

Hell attended the Sanford School in Delaware for one year, where he became friends with Tom Miller, who later changed his name to Tom Verlaine. They ran away from school together and a short time later were arrested in Alabama for arson and vandalism.

Hell never finished high school, instead moving to New York City to make his way as a poet. In New York he met fellow young poet David Giannini, and moved to Santa Fe, New Mexico, for several months, where Giannini and Meyers co-founded Genesis:Grasp. They used an AM VariTyper with changeable fonts to publish the magazine. They began publishing books and magazines, but decided to go their separate ways in 1971, after which Hell created and published Dot Books.

Before he was 21, his own poems were published in numerous periodicals, ranging from Rolling Stone to the New Directions Annuals. In 1971, along with Verlaine, Hell also published under the pseudonym Theresa Stern, a fictional poet whose photo was actually a combination of both his and Verlaine's faces in drag, superimposed over one another to create a new identity. A book of poems credited to "Stern", Wanna Go Out?, was released by Dot in 1973.

=== The Neon Boys, Television, and the Heartbreakers ===
In 1972, Verlaine joined Hell in New York and formed the Neon Boys. In 1974, the band added a second guitarist, Richard Lloyd, and changed their name to Television.

Television's performances at CBGB helped kick-start the first wave of punk bands, inspiring a number of different artists including Patti Smith, who wrote the first press review of Television for the SoHo Weekly News in June 1974. She formed a highly successful band of her own, the Patti Smith Group. Television was one of the early bands to play at CBGB because their manager, Terry Ork, persuaded owner Hilly Kristal to book them alongside the Ramones. They also built the club's first stage. Hell started playing his punk rock anthem "Blank Generation" during his time in Television. In early 1975, Hell parted ways with Television after a dispute over creative control. Hell claimed that he and Verlaine had originally divided the songwriting evenly, but that later Verlaine sometimes refused to play Hell's songs. Verlaine remained silent on the subject.

Hell left Television the same week that Jerry Nolan and Johnny Thunders quit the New York Dolls. In May 1975, the three of them formed the Heartbreakers (not to be confused with Tom Petty's band, which adopted the same name the following year). After one show, Walter Lure joined the Heartbreakers as a second guitarist. Four Heartbreakers demo tracks, recorded while Hell was still in the band, were later released on that band's L.A.M.F. Definitive Edition reissue. A live album recorded with Hell in 1975 was released as What Goes Around... in 1991.

=== Richard Hell and the Voidoids ===
In early 1976, Hell quit the Heartbreakers and started Richard Hell and the Voidoids with Robert Quine, Ivan Julian and Marc Bell. The band released two albums, though the second, Destiny Street, retained only Quine from the original group, with Naux (Juan Maciel) on guitar and Fred Maher on drums. Hell's best known songs with the Voidoids included "Blank Generation", "Love Comes in Spurts", "The Kid With the Replaceable Head" and "Time". In 2009, the guitar tracks on Destiny Street were re-recorded and released as Destiny Street Repaired, with guitarists Julian, Marc Ribot and Bill Frisell playing to the original rhythm tracks. Also in 2009, Hell gave his blessing to the public access program Pancake Mountain to create an animated music video for "The Kid with the Replaceable Head". It was the Voidoids' first and only official music video. The cut used for the animation appears on Hell's 2005 retrospective album, Spurts, The Richard Hell Story.

=== Dim Stars and other collaborations ===
Hell's only other album release was as part of the band Dim Stars, for which he came out of retirement for a month in the early 1990s. Dim Stars featured guitarist Thurston Moore and drummer Steve Shelley from Sonic Youth, Gumball's guitarist Don Fleming, and Quine. They formed only to record a 1991 EP and a 1992 album, both titled Dim Stars, and played one show in public, a WFMU benefit at The Ritz in Manhattan. Hell played bass, sang lead vocals and wrote the lyrics for the album.

Hell also guested on the 1993 Roller Coaster album by Shotgun Rationale, and co-wrote and sang lead vocals on the song "Never Mind" by the Heads, a 1996 collaborative effort between three former members of Talking Heads.

=== Books ===
The Voidoid, a novella written in 1973, was finally published by CodeX in 1993. It was reissued in 2009 by 38th Street Publishers with illustrations by Kier Cooke Sandvik. His early poetry collections include I Was a Spiral on the Floor (1988) and Across the Years (1992), both published by Soyo Publications. Artifact: Notebooks from Hell 1974–1980, a collection of his punk-era journals, was released in 1990 by Hanuman Books. In 1996, Scribner published Hell's first full-length novel, Go Now, set in 1980 and drawn largely from his own experiences. Hell released a collection of short pieces (poems, essays and drawings) called Hot and Cold in 2001. His second novel, Godlike, was published in 2005 by Akashic Books as part of Dennis Cooper's Little House on the Bowery Series. Also published in 2005 was Rabbit Duck, a book of 13 poems written in collaboration with David Shapiro. More recent works include Psychopts (2008), a collaboration with artist Christopher Wool, as well as Disgusting (2010) and I Dreamed I Was a Very Clean Tramp (2013).

Hell's nonfiction has been widely anthologized, including a number of appearances in "best music writing" collections. The Toilet Paper Columns (2007) compiled his columns for the Colorado alternative magazine Toilet Paper, while Massive Pissed Love: Nonfiction 2001-2014 was issued by Soft Skull Press in 2015. Hell's archive of his manuscripts, tapes, correspondence (written and email), journals and other documents of his life was purchased for $50,000 by New York University's Fales Library in 2003.

A mural in Hell's hometown of Lexington, Kentucky, created by students from Lexington Montessori High School, was completed in June 2019. The mural, located in the city's North Limestone neighborhood, has three parts: two profiles of Hell, and a quote from his autobiography, I Dreamed I Was a Very Clean Tramp. "This was in Lexington, Ky. when everybody was a kid. I looked for caves and birds and ran away from home. My favorite thing to do was to run away. The words ‘let’s run away’ still sounds magical to me."

=== Films ===
Hell has appeared in several low-budget films, most notably Susan Seidelman's Smithereens. Other acting appearances include Ulli Lommel's Blank Generation, Nick Zedd's Geek Maggot Bingo, Rachel Amadeo's What About Me? and Rachid Kerdouche's Final Reward. Hell had a non-speaking cameo role as Madonna's murdered boyfriend in Seidelman's 1985 Desperately Seeking Susan.

=== Mississippi River Excursion ===
In 1986, to commemorate the publication of Adventures of Huckleberry Finn by Mark Twain one hundred years before, Hell and Legs McNeil spent several days on the Mississippi River in inflatable rubber rafts, starting in Hannibal, Missouri and ending in Hamburg, Illinois. They co-wrote an article in the November 1986 issue of Spin magazine recounting their experiences.

=== Personal life ===
Hell in 2013.

In 1968, Hell dated Patty Mucha (then Patty Oldenburg), the estranged wife of sculptor Claes Oldenburg, when he was nineteen and she was thirty-four. Their relationship lasted two years. Hell dated Nancy Spungen in 1976 for a few months before she moved to England.

Hell's relationship with Lizzy Mercier Descloux began during her first trip to New York City. She inspired his song "Another World" from the album Blank Generation, and his first novel, Go Now. Hell also contributed to her artist's book, Desiderata, and co-translated the Rimbaud poem "The Drunken Boat" with her.

Hell was married to Scandal's Patty Smyth for two years during 1985–86, and they had a daughter. He was married to museum curator Sheelagh Bevan from 2002 to 2016. In January 2020, it was mentioned on Hell's website that he was in a relationship with novelist Katherine Faw.

== Discography ==
=== With the Heartbreakers ===
==== Compilation albums ====
- L.A.M.F. Definitive Edition (2012, Jungle Records)

==== Live albums ====
- What Goes Around... (1991, Bomp! Records)
- Live at Mothers (1991)
- Yonkers Demo 1976 (2019)

=== With Richard Hell and the Voidoids ===
==== Studio albums ====
- Blank Generation (1977, Sire Records)
- Destiny Street (1982, Red Star Records)

==== Compilation albums ====
- Destiny Street Repaired (2009, Insound)
- Destiny Street Remixed (2021, Omnivore Records)

==== Live albums ====
- Funhunt: Live at CBGB's and Max's 1978 and 1979 (1990, ROIR)
- Gone to Hell (2008, Vinyl Japan)

=== As Richard Hell ===
==== Compilation albums ====
- R.I.P. (1984, ROIR)
- Across the Years box set (1991, Soyo Records)
- Time (2002, Matador Records)
- Spurts: The Richard Hell Story (2005, Sire Records/Rhino Records)

==== EPs ====
- Another World (1976, Ork/Stiff Records)
- 3 New Songs (1992, Overground Records)
- Go Now (1995, CodeX/Tim-Kerr Records)

=== With Dim Stars ===
==== Studio albums ====
- Dim Stars (1992, Caroline Records)

==== EPs ====
- Dim Stars (1991, Ecstatic Peace!)

== Bibliography ==
- Wanna Go Out? with Tom Verlaine, as "Theresa Stern" (1973, Dot Books)
- I Was a Spiral on the Floor (1988, Soyo Publications)
- Artifact: Notebooks from Hell 1974–1980. No. 37 (1990, Hanuman Books)
- Across the Years (1992, Soyo Publications)
- The Voidoid (1993, CodeX)
- Go Now (1996, Scribner)
- Weather (1998, CUZ Editions)
- Hot and Cold (2001, powerHouse Books)
- Rabbit Duck with David Shapiro (2005, Repair Books)
- Godlike (2005, Akashic Books)
- The Toilet Paper Columns (2007, CUZ Editions)
- Psychopts with Christopher Wool (2008, JMc & GHB)
- Disgusting (2010, 38th Street Publishers)
- I Dreamed I Was a Very Clean Tramp (2013, Ecco)
- Massive Pissed Love: Nonfiction 2001-2014 (2015, Soft Skull Press)
- What Just Happened with Christopher Wool (2023, Winter Editions)

== Filmography ==
- Final Reward (1978)
- Blank Generation (1980)
- Smithereens (1982)
- Geek Maggot Bingo (1983)
- Desperately Seeking Susan (1985)
- No Picnic (1987)
- What About Me (1993)
- Blind Light (1998)
