= Roberta Bayley =

American photographer

Roberta Bayley is a photographer, best known for her photographs of the New York punk scene of the 1970s.

== Life ==
Bayley was born in Pasadena, California and grew up in the San Francisco Bay Area. She attended San Francisco State University for three years before dropping out in 1971. She moved to London where she lived for three years. In 1973 she briefly worked for Malcolm McLaren and Vivienne Westwood in their store Let It Rock. In that same year she met singer and songwriter Ian Dury whose band Kilburn and the High Roads were playing at a pub in Whitechapel. A romance ensued, until Bayley moved to New York in the spring of 1974.

In July of 1974 Bayley met musician and poet Richard Hell, and months later began working the door at CBGBs at the request of Terry Ork, the manager of Hell's band Television. After splitting with Hell in early 1975, CBGB owner Hilly Kristal asked if she could continue working the door, which she did until 1978 when she went to work for Blondie in the office of Peter Leeds, the manager of the band at the time. While Bayley had taken a few photography classes in high school in the 60s, it wasn't until November 1975 that she bought a camera to document what she saw going on in New York's downtown music scene.

In 1976, she went to work for John Holmstrom and Legs McNeil at Punk magazine. She photographed the Ramones for the third issue in February 1976. Her image from that session became the cover of the band's first album. Apparently the record label had initially hired a different photographer, but the band rejected those photos and instead selected Bayley's image. Bayley served as chief photographer for Punk Magazine from the second issue until its demise.

In addition to her images of the Ramones, Bayley is known for her pictures of Debbie Harry of Blondie, Richard Hell, Johnny Thunders of the Heartbreakers, Iggy Pop, The Sex Pistols, The Clash, The Damned, Nick Lowe, Rockpile, Elvis Costello, X-Ray Spex, Billy Idol, and many, many others.

Bayley still lives in New York's East Village. In addition to several monographs of her work, her photographs have been published in seminal histories of punk, including Please Kill Me: The Uncensored Oral History of Punk (1997) and Blank Generation Revisited: The Early Days of Punk. She was co-author on The Unauthorized Biography of Patti Smith (1996, Simon & Schuster) and her Blondie book Blondie Unseen (2006, Plexus) is still available.
