= Richard Hell and the Voidoids =

American punk rock band

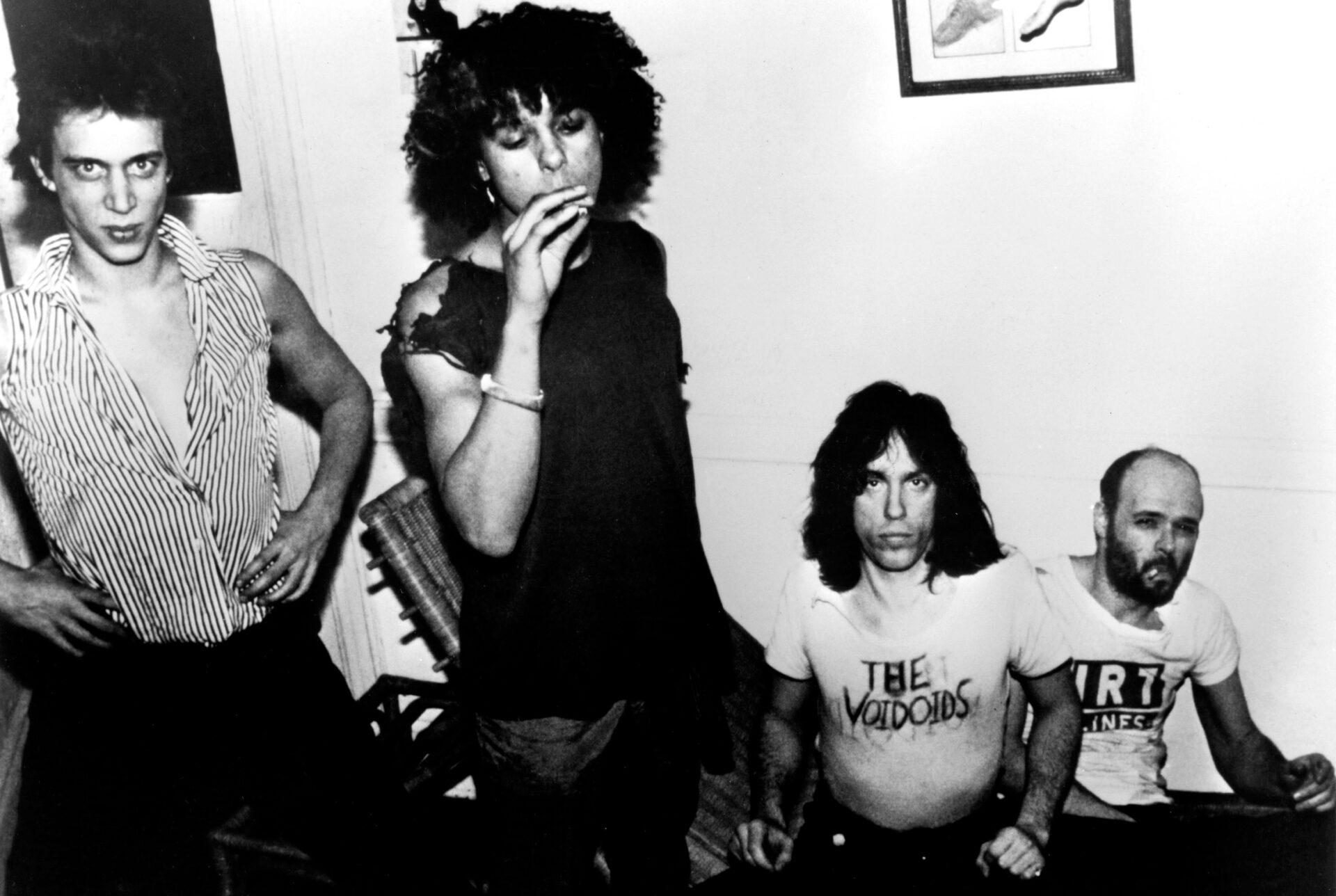
- Richard Hell and the Voidoids in 1977. Left to right: Richard Hell, Ivan Julian, Marc Bell, and Robert Quine.

Background information
- Origin: New York City, United States
- Genres: Punk rock; art punk
- Years active: 1976–1979, 1981–1983, 1990 (Japanese tour only), 2000 (recording only)
- Labels: Sire; Radar; Red Star; ROIR; Shake
- Past members: See below

Richard Hell and the Voidoids were an American punk rock band, formed in New York City in 1976 and fronted by Richard Hell, a former member of the Neon Boys, Television and the Heartbreakers.

== History ==
Kentucky-born Richard Meyers moved to New York City after dropping out of high school in 1966, aspiring to become a poet. He and his best friend from high school, Tom Miller, founded the rock band the Neon Boys which became Television in 1973. The pair adopted stage names; Miller called himself Verlaine after Paul Verlaine, a French poet he admired, and Meyers became Richard Hell because, as he has said, it described his condition.

The group was the first rock band to play the club CBGB, which soon became a breeding ground for the early punk rock scene in New York. Hell had an energetic stage presence and wore torn clothing held together with safety pins and his hair spiked, which was to be influential in punk fashion. In 1975, after a failed management deal with the New York Dolls, impresario Malcolm McLaren claimed to have brought these ideas back with him to England and eventually incorporated them into the Sex Pistols' image, a claim which Sex Pistols' front man John Lydon/Johnny Rotten disputes, citing his own existing use of safety pins and spiked hair (dyed green) prior to joining the Pistols.

Disputes with Verlaine led to Hell's departure from Television in April 1975, and he co-founded the Heartbreakers with New York Dolls guitarist Johnny Thunders. Hell did not last long with this band, and he began recruiting members for a new band in early 1976. For guitarists, Hell found Robert Quine and Ivan Julian—Quine had worked in a bookstore with Hell, and Julian responded to an advertisement in The Village Voice. They lifted drummer Marc Bell, later Marky Ramone, from Wayne County. The band was named "the Voidoids" after a novel Hell had been writing.

Musically, Hell drew inspiration from acts such as Bob Dylan, the Rolling Stones, the Beatles, protopunk band the Stooges and fellow New Yorker group the Velvet Underground, a group with a reputation for heroin-fueled rock and roll with poetic lyrics. Quine's admiration of the Velvet Underground led him to make hours' worth of bootleg recordings of the band in the late 1960s. Hell also drew from—and covered—garage rock bands such as the Seeds and the Count Five that were found on the Nuggets compilation of 1972. The Voidoids' music was also characterized as art punk.

Hell had written the song "Blank Generation" while still in Television; he had played it regularly with the band since at least 1975, and later with the Heartbreakers. The Voidoids released a 7" Blank Generation EP in 1976 on Ork Records including "Blank Generation", "Another World" and "You Gotta Lose". The cover featured a black-and-white cover photo taken by Hell's former girlfriend Roberta Bayley, depicting a bare-chested Hell with an open jeans zipper. It was an underground hit, and the band signed to Sire Records for its album debut.

== Legacy ==
The Voidoids are considered to have pioneered the "punk look" and studded appearance which also became popular later on in the UK via the Sex Pistols. Lydon disputes the Voidoids influence on British punk appearance.

== Members ==
- Richard Hell – vocals, bass
- Robert Quine – guitar (died 2004)
- Ivan Julian – guitar
- Marc Bell (Marky Ramone) – drums
- Naux (Juan Maciel) – guitar (died 2009)
- Frank Mauro – drums
- Michael Allison – guitar
- Jody Harris – guitar
- Fred Maher – drums
- Jerry Antonius – bass
- Jahn Xavier Bonfiglio – bass
- Ted Horowitz – bass
- James Morrison – drums
- Anton Fier – drums (died 2022)
- Geoff Freeman – guitar
- Charles Wood – drums
- Michael Paumgarten – guitar
- Sue Williams – bass

== Discography ==
=== Studio albums ===
- Blank Generation (1977, Sire Records)
- Destiny Street (1982, Red Star Records)

=== Singles and EPs ===
- "Another World" EP (1976, Ork Records)
- "Blank Generation" 7" single (1977, Sire Records)
- The Blank Generation 12" EP (1977, Sire Records)
- "The Kid with the Replaceable Head" 7" single (1978, Radar Records)

=== Live albums ===
- Funhunt: Live at CBGB's & Max's 1978 and 1979 (1989, ROIR)
- Gone to Hell (2008, Vinyl Japan)

=== Compilation albums ===
- Destiny Street Repaired (2009, Insound)

== Filmography ==
- Blank Generation (1980)

== Sources ==
- Astor, Pete (2014). Richard Hell and the Voidoids' Blank Generation. Bloomsbury Publishing. ISBN 978-1-62356-856-6.
- Balls, Richard (2014). Be Stiff: The Stiff Records Story. Soundcheck Books. ISBN 978-0-9575700-6-1.
- Finney, Ross (April 10, 2012). A Blank Generation: Richard Hell and American Punk Rock (PDF) (Senior thesis). University of Notre Dame.
- Hannon, Sharon M. (2010). Punks: A Guide to an American Subculture. ABC-CLIO. ISBN 978-0-313-36456-3.
- Hermes, Will (2011). Love Goes to Buildings on Fire: Five Years in New York That Changed Music Forever. Faber and Faber. ISBN 978-1-4299-6867-6.
- Law, Glenn (2003). "Richard Hell". In Buckley, Peter (ed.). The Rough Guide to Rock. Rough Guides. pp. 485–486. ISBN 978-1-84353-105-0.
- Lydon, John; Zimmerman, Keith (1994). Rotten: No Irish, No Blacks, No Dogs (2008 Reprint ed.). Picador. ISBN 0312428138.
