= Art McMahon =

American football player (born 1946)

No. 28, 29
- Position: Defensive back

Personal information
- Born: February 24, 1946 (age 80); Carteret, New Jersey, U.S.
- Listed height: 6 ft 0 in (1.83 m)
- Listed weight: 190 lb (86 kg)

Career information
- High school: Carteret
- College: NC State (1964–1967)
- NFL draft: 1968: 15th round, 385th overall pick

Career history
- Boston/New England Patriots (1968–1972); Houston Texans-Shreveport Steamer (1974)

Awards and highlights
- First-team All-ACC (1966)

Career NFL/AFL statistics
- Interceptions: 3
- Fumble recoveries: 2
- Stats at Pro Football Reference

Arthur John McMahon (born February 24, 1946) is an American former professional football player who was a defensive back in the American Football League (AFL) and National Football League (NFL). He was selected by the Boston Patriots in the 15th round of the 1968 NFL/AFL draft. He played college football for the NC State Wolfpack.

Born in Newark, New Jersey, McMahon grew up in Carteret, New Jersey and attended Carteret High School. A graduate in the class of 1964, McMahon is one of four Carteret alumni to play in the NFL as of 2023, joining Stan Kosel (class of 1935), Jason Worilds (class of 2006), and Sam Kamara (class of 2016).

== Professional career ==
McMahon was selected by the Boston Patriots in the 15th round (385th overall) of the 1968 NFL/AFL draft. He played for the Boston Patriots in 1968 to 1970 and for the renamed New England Patriots in 1972. McMahon missed half of the 1970 season and all of 1971 due to injury.
