= Knightsbridge (disambiguation) =

Knightsbridge is a street and district in London.

Knightsbridge may also refer to:

== Places ==
=== England ===
- Knightsbridge tube station, a London Underground station
- Knightsbridge, Gloucestershire, a hamlet

=== Military history sites ===
- Knightsbridge Cemetery (France), named after a World War I trench system near Beaumont-Hamel
- Knightsbridge War Cemetery (Libya), established north of the town of Acroma (Akramah) following World World War II
- Knightsbridge, the Allied codename for an intersection south of Acroma, which became the focus of the Battle of Knightsbridge (1942)

=== Other places ===
- Knightsbridge, an estate/subdivision in Castle Hill, Sydney, Australia
- The Knightsbridge Residences, a high-end residential skyscraper in Manila, Philippines
- Knightsbridge University, an unaccredited institution in Denmark

== Other uses ==
- Knightsbridge International, a US-based non-government organization
- "Knightsbridge" (Neverwhere), a 1996 television episode
- "Knightsbridge", the third movement of the London Suite by Eric Coates

== See also ==
- Knightbridge Professor of Philosophy
