= Brent Bennett =

United States Army soldier

Brent Bennett is a former US Army paratrooper who was convicted by an Afghan court on 15 September 2004 for participating in torture and kidnapping, and for running a private jail in Kabul.

Bennett and his associate Jonathan Idema had been operating as independent security contractors in Afghanistan, but had been representing themselves to the American and international media, members of the US military, and Afghan nationals as US government-sponsored covert operatives to track and apprehend Osama bin Laden and senior Taliban officials. The US government has repeatedly denied the validity of their claims.

Bennett and Idema, along with journalist Edward Caraballo were arrested by Afghan police on 5 July 2004, during a raid in which they found eight Afghan men (some hanging from their feet) bound and hooded in detention. On 15 September 2004 a three-judge Afghan panel headed by Judge Abdul Baset Bakhtyari sentenced both Idema and Bennett to a ten-year prison term, while Caraballo received eight years. Idema and Bennett's sentences were later cut to five and three respectively. Caraballo claimed he was filming Idema and Bennett for a documentary on counterterrorism. Four Afghans working with Idema were sentenced to between one and five years imprisonment.

On 30 September 2006, after serving more than two years of his sentence, Bennett was released from prison and flown out of Afghanistan. US officials secured Bennett a passport and a ticket out of the country.
