= Jonathan Idema =

American mercenary and criminal (1956–2012)

- Idema during his 2004 trial in Kabul, Afghanistan
- Born: May 30, 1956; Poughkeepsie, New York, United States
- Died: January 21, 2012 (aged 55); Bacalar, Quintana Roo, Mexico
- Criminal charges: Conspiracy, Wire Fraud, Torture, Impersonating an officer
- Spouse: Viktoria Runningwolf (divorced)
- Partner(s): Penny Alesi, Patricia Dawn Glosson

Jonathan Keith "Jack" Idema (May 30, 1956 – January 21, 2012) was an American con artist, mercenary and former United States Army reserve non-commissioned officer, known for his vigilante activities during the War in Afghanistan.

Formerly a soldier in the U.S. Army Special Forces, Idema never saw combat and left the military in 1984 to form several companies centered around counterterrorism and internal security. Idema made numerous unverified claims about his military service and supposed terrorist threats, and experienced several lawsuits over various feuds.

In September 2004, Idema was found guilty of running an unlawful and unsanctioned private prison in Afghanistan and torturing Afghan citizens. At the time, Idema had been falsely portraying himself as a U.S. government-sponsored special forces operative on a mission to apprehend terrorists. The U.S. government repeatedly denied most of his claims.

Idema served three years of a ten-year sentence. He was released early by Afghanistan's then-president Hamid Karzai in April 2007, and left Afghanistan in early June for Mexico, where he died of AIDS in late January 2012.

== Early life ==
Idema was raised in Poughkeepsie, New York, graduating from high school there in 1974. His father, former Marine and World War II veteran Herman John Idema, believed that his son was a "dedicated American". Herman John Idema died in November 2008.

== Military service ==
Idema enlisted in the U.S. Army in February 1975. Two years after his enlistment, in 1977, he trained and qualified for the United States Army Special Forces.

The nature of Idema's military service in the Special Forces is contentious. Tod Robberson of The Dallas Morning News noted that there was a discrepancy between what Idema claimed his military experience was and what is stated in his official military record. Idema repeatedly stated that he acquired 12 years of Special Forces service, 22 years of combat training, and 18 years of covert operations experience. However, per official records, Idema's military career was short and contained several reports of poor performance, with no recorded combat experience.

According to his military record obtained in the course of his 1994 fraud trial, after serving one term in the Special Forces, Idema was not allowed to reenlist. He had received numerous negative remarks from superior officers, in addition to participating in three non-judicial punishment proceedings between April 29, 1976 and April 28, 1977. Idema was cited for "failure to obey orders, being derelict in the performance of his duty, and being disrespectful to a superior commanding officer." One superior officer, Captain John D. Carlson, stated that Idema was "without a doubt the most unmotivated, unprofessional, immature enlisted man I have ever known."

Idema was given an honorable discharge and allowed to join the United States Army Reserve 11th Special Forces Group working to provide logistical support. In a November 1, 1980 letter of reprimand, Major Paul R. Decker wrote that Idema "consistently displayed an attitude of noncooperation with persons outside his immediate working environment, disregard for authority and gross immaturity characterized by irrationality and a tendency toward violence." In January 1981, Idema was relieved of his Army Reserve duties; his last position was the assistant sergeant of operations and intelligence. After leaving the Army Reserves, he became a member of the Individual Ready Reserve until he left the military completely in 1984.

== Business interests ==
Several years after he left the Army, Idema became involved in the paintball business, opening a paintball supply and equipment company in Fayetteville, North Carolina, named Idema Combat Systems. He later segued that business into a paramilitary clothier and supply company operating under the same name.

Sometime in the early 1980s Idema founded Counterr Group (also known as US Counter-Terrorist Group), a business entity which, according to its website, specialized in expert training for counter-terrorism, assault tactics, and other security-related services. Counterr Group's legal status and ownership was questionable; according to a Soldier of Fortune article published in 2004, Idema was mentioned as the owner. The company website listed an address in North Carolina, but there was no record of the company's registration in that state. However, a company called "Counter Group, Inc." had been incorporated in 1997 by William L. London, a lawyer who represented Idema in several lawsuits. The status for this company was listed as "suspended" as of 2004.

Counterr Group Academy was operational for at least ten years, from the late 1970s to the late 1980s. It was based at a small airstrip south of Route 199 in Red Hook, New York. There were several permanent staff, as well as visiting staff, all under the direction of Keith Idema. At least ten formal courses of training were offered. These included basic firearm safety, offered to the general public, as well as pistol, rifle and shotgun programs in both assault and combat roles, offered only to active military servicemen and police. Rappelling, both with and without a firearm component, was offered at the on-ground rappelling tower. The facilities included both interior and exterior "Hogan's Alley" style environments, equipped with reactive targets. Courses consisted of both classroom study and field exercises.

All advanced training was in a live-fire environment. Combat and assault courses lasted for three days. Trainees, up to 20 per course, lived and slept on the premises. Nighttime courses were conducted with starlight scopes.

The only company in North Carolina registered to Jonathan Idema is Idema Combat Systems, which, according to state records, was incorporated in January 1991 and dissolved in July 1994. The websites for Counter Group are registered to Thomas R. Bumback, a business associate of Idema's who is believed to be the company's current director. There is a record of Counterr Group being formed in Poughkeepsie, New York in 1983, but the company is listed as "inactive."

Idema also owned a company called Special Operations Exposition and Trade Show Inc., which hosted organized conventions for military equipment suppliers.

There are two other known companies, Isabeau Dakota, Inc. and Star America Aviation Company, Ltd., that have connections to Idema. The latter claims to be an aviation support company founded in July 2008 with operations based out of Dubai. Both companies are registered to William "Skip" London in North Carolina, but Isabeau Dakota is listed as a shell company; its last annual report, filed in 2002, identifies H. John Idema (Idema's father) of Poughkeepsie as president and sole officer, and it lists no significant assets or business activity. The website for Star America Aviation is also registered to Bumback and the websites for Counterr Group and Star America Aviation are very similar, including the use of imagery depicting Idema in Afghanistan and prior to his arrest.

Idema's Afghan charity Northern Alliance Assistance in Fayetteville, North Carolina was later listed as a dog kennel.

== Legal issues ==
In addition to his occasional entrepreneurial pursuits, Idema had a substantial criminal record. Over the years, Idema was charged with impersonating an officer, conspiracy, passing bad checks, assault, possession of stolen property, and discharging a firearm into a dwelling. In January 1994, Idema was arrested and charged with 58 counts of wire fraud, having allegedly defrauded 59 companies of about $260,000. He was convicted of the charges, sentenced to six years in prison (paroled after having served three years) and was subsequently ordered to pay restitution.

Idema was also involved in multiple lawsuits, including suits against journalists, an aid worker, a colonel, his father, and the U.S. government. A prominent lawsuit filed by Idema against Steven Spielberg and Dreamworks Studios contended that Idema was the basis of a character in the 1997 Dreamworks film The Peacemaker. The claim was dismissed, and Idema was ordered to pay $267,079 in legal fees.

On August 15, 2001, a jury awarded Idema $781,818 for property damage and $1 million for punitive damages. The award came after a jury decided that a property manager improperly sold some of his belongings while Idema was serving his fraud sentence. Two property managers were hired by Idema to take care of a building that housed equipment for two of his businesses, Special Operations Exposition and Trade Show Inc., and Idema Combat Systems. According to the lawsuit, equipment was missing, damaged or destroyed, and holes were punched in the walls of the building. Idema sued both property managers and their wives on April 10, 2000, but everyone except for one property manager was later dropped from the suit. Idema never collected the $1.8 million because the property manager that was found liable declared bankruptcy, and Idema settled for $650,000 that he obtained through lawsuits filed against insurance carriers. Idema's father was the insured.

In June 2005, an investigator sued Idema alleging that he wasn't paid when Idema won the $1.8 million lawsuit. The investigator claimed that Idema orally agreed to pay 15% of any amount collected, he also claimed that Idema failed to pay court reporters, expert witnesses, and others who helped him with his case.

== Lithuania and nuclear weapons smuggling claim ==
In 1993 Idema was contracted to train police forces in Lithuania. After his return, he contacted officials from both the United States Department of Defense (DoD) and the Federal Bureau of Investigation (FBI), claiming to have uncovered a conspiracy by the Russian mafia to smuggle nuclear materials out of Lithuania. According to Idema, FBI agents demanded he provide the names of his contacts. He refused, claiming that the FBI was infiltrated by KGB agents and that his sources would have been killed.

It was around this time that Idema was being investigated for wire fraud and eventually convicted in 1994. The FBI began their investigation into Idema's activities as early as May 1991, before he even approached the FBI about Lithuania.

== Afghanistan ==
=== Entry and credentials ===
Illegal entry into Afghanistan was one of the charges leveled against Idema and two other Americans accompanying him, former soldier Brent Bennett and television journalist Edward Caraballo. That charge was eventually dropped.

Idema first traveled to Afghanistan in November 2001 to conduct what he said was "humanitarian aid" work, when he was actually working for the National Geographic Channel with Gary Scurka. It was at this time that he involved himself in the research Robin Moore was conducting for his book The Hunt for Bin Laden.

According to Scurka, a reporter for CBS News, Idema contacted him a few weeks after the September 11 attacks and announced he was going to Afghanistan to do humanitarian aid work with Knightsbridge International and the Partners International Foundation, two aid groups run by former military personnel. This led to Scurka and Idema presenting a film documentary project for National Geographic.

Idema, Scurka, and Greg Long (a member of the Partners International Foundation) traveled to Tashkent, Uzbekistan, where they were arrested for visa problems and held in a cell overnight. The three were freed after their captors received a letter from the U.S. embassy in Uzbekistan, written by an officer in the Defense Attaché's Office, describing Idema and Scurka as "contracting officers from the Defense Department who arrived in Uzbekistan for an official trip." The letter, which was verified as authentic by the director of the Department of State's press office, was dated November 2, 2001, and asked Uzbekistan's Ministry of Foreign Affairs for help in issuing visas to Idema, Gary Scurka, and Greg Long.

Idema then joined the Partners International Foundation at the same time Scurka received a National Geographic assignment to produce a documentary on humanitarian aid work in Afghanistan. A memo signed by the president of the National Geographic Channel says Scurka would be going to Afghanistan with Knightsbridge International, and the leader of Knightsbridge, Edward Artis, would be working with Idema. Artis was sued by Idema.

Author Robert Young Pelton believes that Idema then used those letters and what appeared to be a falsified or modified military ID. Idema claimed he had a visa similar to those carried by U.S. Army Special Forces to convince the Afghan commanders and other people of his official status.

After Idema entered Afghanistan, both humanitarian organizations quickly became wary of Idema's intentions. In December 2001, Artis wrote to the U.S. Army Special Operations Command warning them of Idema's activities, stating:

[Idema] is a very dangerous person by virtue of his carelessness and stupidity, and before he gets someone killed ... he needs to be removed from the area. I feel that given the amount of time that he has been allowed to run around telling people he has been working for the U.S. Embassy, Pentagon, Special Ops under cover or the CIA, that he has garnered or bought enough contacts to pose a real threat to not only me and those near me but the over all mission of the United States and the Coalition that is fighting there.

Idema later filed suit against Artis and Knightsbridge, but the case was dismissed and a monetary judgement was in turn placed against him.

=== Activities ===
Idema led a group he called "Task Force Saber 7", consisting of two other Americans and several Afghans. The group may have been operating in Afghanistan with independent financial backing or with funds from the lawsuit settlements Idema had won a few years earlier. He frequently interacted with reporters, often going to great lengths in his interviews to stress connections with the CIA and Special Forces. Some supporters suggest that he was a former member of an unspecified covert operations unit, reactivated and positioned in Afghanistan to hunt for Osama bin Laden as part of Alec Station. A relationship to the Northern Alliance was denied by their official representative in the United States.

Some critics of Idema claim that his attempts to create a high profile with the media make it unlikely that Idema was officially connected with any branch of the military; covert operatives go to great lengths to avoid public appearances and media, and are barred from unauthorized contact. The fact that Caraballo, who was not a soldier, was with Idema in Afghanistan to document his activities strained credibility that Idema was operating covertly. It is also unlikely Idema would be selected to a government job in an official capacity given his service record.

Idema was known to have a volatile temper that seemed to be particularly directed against news correspondents assigned to Kabul. On several occasions, Idema threatened journalists with bodily harm or death, and in one particular instance, at a dinner in December 2001, he threatened to kill a reporter from Stars and Stripes because the reporter had disclosed Idema's fraud conviction.

It has been recorded that Idema frequently contacted the DoD through the front office of General William G. Boykin in the Pentagon, and that his information was duly acknowledged. However, all of those contacts were outside the U.S. military operating channels, and were all one-sided calls from Afghanistan via Idema's personal satellite phone. Boykin's office repeatedly asked Idema to stop making these unsolicited phone calls, because they were disruptive and time-consuming, and Boykin could not be of assistance. Idema continued calling Boykin's office anyway to establish some sort of self-serving relationship until his arrest. While the U.S. government was aware of Idema's activities in Afghanistan, they stated there was unequivocally no relationship between them.

The United States Central Command stated that International Security Assistance Force forces received one detainee from Idema on May 3, 2004. Idema claimed that the individual was associated with the Taliban. Once in ISAF custody however, the detainee was determined not to be who Idema claimed, and was released in the first week of July.

The United States was not the only government that had contact with Idema in Afghanistan. On three occasions, Idema tricked the Canadian-led NATO mission into providing explosives experts and bomb-sniffing dogs. According to a spokesman for the ISAF, Idema called for and received technical support after his vigilante team raided compounds on 20, 22, and 24 June 2004. ISAF personnel believed they were "providing legitimate support to a legitimate security agency."

Idema also received assistance from Yunus Qanuni, former minister, senior Afghan government security advisor, and influential member of the Northern Alliance. In one video tape presented at Idema's trial, Qanuni thanked Idema for uncovering an assassination plot against him and volunteered his personal security forces to help Idema with arrests. Another tape appeared to show Qanuni's security troops assisting Idema in a house raid.

On July 4, 2004, the United States Central Command released a media advisory that read:

U.S. citizen Jonathan K. Idema has allegedly represented himself as an American government and/or military official. The public should be aware that Idema does not represent the American government and we do not employ him.

In perhaps the most terse assessment of Idema's alleged involvement in Operation Enduring Freedom, Billy Waugh, senior CIA covert operative and decorated former Special Forces member who was part of the Agency-run "Jawbreaker" team, said:

We only had 80 guys involved in our [Afghanistan] operations and Idema wasn't one of them.

=== Arrest, trial, and sentencing ===
Idema and his associates Brent Bennett and Edward Caraballo were arrested on July 5, 2004 by Afghan police during a raid in which they found eight Afghan men, some hanging from their feet, bound and hooded in detention. The arrest of Idema occurred only about three months after 60 Minutes II broke the story about the Abu Ghraib torture and prisoner abuse scandal.

Idema claimed to have had private contact with Lieutenant General Boykin and several other senior Pentagon officials, and at his trial introduced taped conversations with staff of General Boykin's office, although not directly with Boykin himself. In the conversations, the staff members said that they would pass Idema's information along to proper authorities. However, the judge stated that the videos were "inconclusive" and that he lacked concrete, documentary evidence. American Embassy officials stated that as far as they knew, neither Mr. Idema nor anyone in his group was working for a government agency, and the military issued statements saying Idema was impersonating government or military officials and did not represent either.

He further tried to prove his official status when he claimed to be working for the US Counter Terrorism Group, the same group that some sources say he founded. He claimed his group had prevented assassination attempts on Education Minister Yunus Qanuni and Defense Minister Marshal Mohammad Qasim Fahim. He also claimed the FBI interrogated several militants captured by his group and that after his arrest, the FBI removed from his premises hundreds of videos, photos, and documents. Some of the pieces were later returned to Idema and his defense team.

The DoD's only official contact with Idema was accepting one prisoner who was held for a month by the U.S. military, but added that officials declined his offer to work with the government in capturing terror suspects in Afghanistan. In early 2004, Idema was in contact with Heather Anderson, the Pentagon's Acting Director of Security. Anderson was under the supervision of the chief official responsible for intelligence matters in Donald Rumsfeld's office. Idema told the Afghan court that Anderson commended his work, but Anderson said she later turned down Idema's request to work in Afghanistan for the Pentagon. Idema continued to contact Anderson's office in hopes of establishing a relationship.

Idema, Caraballo and Bennett were charged with entering the country illegally, running a private prison, and torture. John Tiffany served as Idema's attorney. During the trial, Idema charged that he, Caraballo, and Bennett were being beaten while in Afghan custody; however, U.S. authorities stated the men were being treated humanely.

On 15 September 2004, a three-judge Afghan panel headed by Judge Abdul Baset Bakhtyari sentenced both Idema and Bennett to a ten-year prison term, while Caraballo received eight years. Idema and Bennett's sentences were later cut to five and three respectively. Caraballo claimed he was filming Idema and Bennett for a documentary on counterterrorism. Four Afghans working with Idema were sentenced to between one and five years imprisonment.

Caraballo was later pardoned by President Hamid Karzai and returned to the United States. Bennett was released early for good behavior on September 30, 2006.

Caraballo's lawyer said that the day before Caraballo left Afghanistan, Caraballo and Bennett lived in a filthy 6x8 ft. cell with four suspected Al-Qaeda members; the American prisoners were moved to a different prison for better protection. In a more recent assessment, the cell in which the prisoners lived was described as "posh".

=== Amnesty and refusal to leave prison ===
On April 10, 2007, the Associated Press reported that Idema would soon be released from prison and then sent back to the United States, and that the Afghan government had granted him amnesty. However, under the amnesty that commuted his sentence he was effectively released on April 4.

Idema refused to leave the prison, first demanding that his passport, personal effects, and documents that he claimed proves his official connection with the U.S. government, be returned to him. According to him, he was owed compensation for $500,000 worth of equipment, mostly computers, weapons, and cameras, that was confiscated by the Afghan government when he was arrested. Having obtained through the offices of the U.S. Embassy in Kabul a new passport and money to apply for a visa to India, Idema insisted that his belongings be returned and that a pet dog previously owned by Bennett be allowed to travel with him.

Idema also filed another lawsuit against the U.S. government, reaffirming allegations initially made in 2005 that he and his associates had been illegally imprisoned, except now with the additional claim that he had been tortured. According to U.S. District Judge Emmet G. Sullivan, "Petitioners allege that United States officials ordered their arrest, ordered their torture, stole exculpatory evidence during their trial and appeal, exerted undue influence over Afghan judges, and either directly or indirectly ordered judges who found petitioners innocent not to release petitioners from prison." This was a shift from the earlier strategy on the part of Idema to exonerate himself on the basis that he was acting on a Pentagon-approved mission. Instead the focus was on the trial itself, specifically whether or not due process was observed, with the added claim of being a torture victim. In both instances Idema accused the U.S. government of deliberately withholding information.

Judge Sullivan subsequently ordered the FBI and the Department of State to answer the allegations. Attorneys from the United States Department of Justice requested the case be dismissed on the grounds that Idema's sentence had been commuted. Idema's lawyer said the government coordinated Idema's amnesty to avoid having to respond to allegations of misconduct.

Idema's allegations of withheld evidence were originally made during his Afghan trial in 2004. When the men were arrested in early July, the tapes were confiscated by the FBI. Caraballo's lawyer, Michael Skibbie, claimed that he was only allowed to access a portion of the tapes weeks after he requested access. Several of the tapes were used; however, Skibbie said several important tapes were damaged, missing or partly erased after the FBI took custody of them. Some of the footage Skibbie obtained was shown in court. The court tapes showed Idema being greeted at an airport by high-ranking Afghan officials, Idema being thanked by Qanuni, security forces working with Idema, captured suspects confessing during interrogation, and ISAF forces helping Idema.

While these proceedings were being conducted, Idema said that another reason he had not left was because he feared for his life, ostensibly at the hands of the Afghan government, saying "I could drive through the Policharki [sic] gates right now. Then what happens? I get arrested. [The intelligence service] will arrest me for not having an Afghan visa and they'll torture me and kill me. If I'm lucky, I'm only going to be tortured." On June 2, 2007, Idema left the prison and was immediately flown out of the country.

== Personal life ==
After leaving Afghanistan, Idema moved to Mexico to become a proprietor of Blue Lagoon Boat Tours out of Bacalar, on the Yucatán Peninsula, under the name of "Black Jack". He was charged by his former girlfriend Penny Alesi of infecting her with HIV when he knew he had the disease. His arrest warrant and publicity surrounding charges were picked up by Mexican and American media.

According to Alesi, he had also claimed to have had nine wives, although only one of them may have been legal. At his death, he was listed as having no immediate survivors.

According to his father's obituary notice, Idema was described as a "Green Beret with an organization involved in the War on Terror."

== Relationship with the media ==
Idema had some success convincing members of the media that he was a terrorism expert. This allowed him to secure interviews and in some instances get his "terrorism videos" broadcast on television. After indicating to journalists that he had the videos in his possession, he would usually agree to provide them in exchange for money. Since Idema's questionable history has come to light, the news media has been criticized for its willingness to distribute any content or information coming from him.

== Controversies ==
At the center of the controversy is Idema's claim that he was in Afghanistan on behalf of the U.S. government and that he was an advisor to the Northern Alliance. At other times, Idema told people he was in Afghanistan doing humanitarian work or that he was a "security consultant" for journalists. He also actively sought media attention for himself and his activities, to the point of offering interviews in return for payment, even though he himself said he was operating covertly.

Many believe Idema to be a con artist or impostor, based on his refusal or inability to demonstrate verifiable proof for his claims, on legal records that contradict his assertions about his background, as well as on a prior conviction for mail fraud and a history of criminal activity. Some have suggested that he may also be delusional in having concocted a fantasy-type personality for himself as a highly trained covert operative combating international terrorism, despite a brief and mostly non-notable military record (which states that Idema was in the Special Forces strictly in a support capacity). This opinion was echoed by Major Scott Nelson, the U.S. military spokesperson in Kabul at the time of Idema's arrest in 2004. The judge in Idema's 1994 fraud trial also questioned Idema's psychological state and ordered him to undergo evaluation prior to his sentencing. The report said that while he was not "mentally ill", Idema had a "personality disorder which would affect his interaction with persons exhibiting similar traits, such as supervisors, attorneys, doctors, judges and other persons in positions of power or authority."

In the early 1990s, Idema claimed that he had learned the Russian mafia planned to smuggle nuclear weapons out of Russia, that he participated in covert operations in Latin America, and that as a soldier he parachuted out of airplanes accompanied by his bomb-sniffing dog Sarge, who he intended to clone.

Idema was not without supporters, usually found among blogs sympathetic to his situation. The contributors to these blogs believed that he was being unjustly punished for actions condoned, if not officially sanctioned, by the U.S. military. However, there has been little support for Idema's claims in general media outlets. Indeed, many members of the media who encountered Idema while they were on assignment in Afghanistan regard him as a fraud.

=== Lithuania ===
In 1995, while Idema was awaiting sentencing for fraud charges, he agreed to provide information to CBS News about the nuclear materials smuggling plot he allegedly uncovered. Gary Scurka produced a 60 Minutes piece entitled "The Worst Nightmare", based in part on Idema's account. According to Scurka, the network declined to credit Idema during the broadcast because of the fraud conviction, even though he was a major source for the story. A CBS spokesperson claimed that the story took 6 months to fully investigate, by which time it was very different from the one Idema gave. Both the 60 Minutes story and a companion piece published in U.S. News & World Report received the Renner Award for Outstanding Crime Reporting.

The lack of credit given to Idema prompted Scurka and Caraballo to begin making a documentary film with the working title, Any Lesser Man: The Keith Idema Story. According to promotional materials, the documentary was to be "the real story of one lone Green Beret's private war against KGB Nuclear Smuggling, Soviet spies, Arab terrorists, and the FBI." It was never completed.

=== Marecek murder trial ===
Idema and Scurka again worked together as consultants for the 48 Hours story about Colonel George Marecek, a highly decorated Special Forces soldier accused and later convicted of murdering his wife. The two were fired from the project because they were determined to be taking an advocacy role for the defense. They opened a "Free Marecek" office in the town where the trial was taking place. In December 2000, 48 Hours ran the story on Marecek which included material from Idema, and Scurka's research. Idema also took a leading part in the formation of Point Blank News to support Marecek.

=== September 11 attacks ===
On the day following the attacks, Idema gave an interview as a "counterterrorism adviser" to KTTV, the Fox network affiliate in Los Angeles. During his news appearance, he claimed that the hijackers might have seized three Canadian jetliners, in addition to four American planes.

=== Afghanistan ===
==== Al Qaeda hoax training footage ====
Idema sold tapes to many publishers that he claimed showed an Al-Qaeda training camp in action. The tapes showed men in camouflaged tunics and ski masks storming buildings, practicing drive-by shootings, and attacking golf courses. CBS bought the right to broadcast the tapes before any other network. They were used in a 60 Minutes II episode called "Heart of Darkness" in January 2002. CBS presented Idema and the tapes he supplied as reliable.

Idema made more money from the same tapes when he sold the rights to rebroadcast the Al-Qaeda training camp footage with still pictures to The Boston Globe, MSNBC, NBC, ABC, BBC, and others.

The authenticity of the several hours of tape is disputed because the supposed tactics shown are not used by Al-Qaeda. The "Al-Qaeda" fighters shown in the footage also occasionally communicated in English and laughed, providing credence to the notion that the tapes were staged. Some major outlets, including NBC Nightly News and CNN, declined to broadcast the tapes due to credibility concerns.

==== Idema in September 2008 Al-Qaeda video ====
Al-Qaeda itself appears to have used some of Idema's footage in their September 2008 video release. In a segment released by ABC, Idema appears "to threaten to kill an Afghan citizen during an interrogation." Al Qaeda claims to have "captured" the footage from Idema, but its provenance remains unclear.

==== State-sponsored terrorism ====
Idema sought to show that he had inside knowledge of Al-Qaeda's collaboration with state governments. For instance, he made suggestions that there was collaboration among North Korea, several Middle-Eastern countries, and Al-Qaeda, and that there was ample evidence linking "Iraq, Iran, and Saudi Arabia to Al-Qaeda and to the attacks on September 11," and that in Afghanistan, the link between Iraq and Al-Qaeda was "common knowledge." He also said that Iraq under Saddam Hussein was a supporter of Al-Qaeda and other terrorist organizations "with money, with equipment, with technology, with weapons of mass destruction." He also claimed to have firsthand knowledge of nuclear weapons being smuggled from Russia to Iraq, Iran, and North Korea.

==== Idema in September 2009 Al-Qaeda video ====
An Al-Qaeda video released in September 2009 appears to contain video clips of Idema torturing an Afghan by dunking his head in a bucket of water. This footage was used to make the case that the U.S. is involved in torture in Afghanistan, despite the U.S. government denying Idema worked for them.

== Media coverage ==
- Soldier of Fortune Magazine had two articles, one called "LOOSE CANNON ON TARGET: Special Forces NCO Battles Federal Bureau of Intimidation" in March 1995 and "SPIKING A LOOSE CANNON: FBI Uses KGB Tactics To Jail SF Operator" in April 1995
- Task Force Dagger: The Hunt for bin Laden (ISBN 0-375-50861-9), by The Green Berets author Robin Moore, had sections devoted to Idema. They referred to him as a special forces operative named "Jack" (he was also featured on the book's cover). Unknown to Moore, Idema had added a number of fictional episodes to the book that he would later use to support his claims. In the manuscript Idema also included appeals for donations to charities listed under his and his wife's address. He managed to do this by altering the final manuscript without Moore's consent before it was sent to the publisher. Random House quietly dropped the book from print after publishing what had become a work of fiction that even its author had disavowed. Moore has since regretted Idema's involvement and insisted that the publisher refused to include his corrections.
- Robert Young Pelton, in his book about private security contractors, Licensed to Kill: Hired Guns in the War on Terror (ISBN 1-4000-9781-9), devotes a chapter to Idema's exploits in Afghanistan, including his controversial involvement in Moore's book Task Force Dagger: The Hunt for bin Laden.
- Peter Bergen's article published in Rolling Stone, "Jack Idema: Shadow Warrior," examines Idema's military career.
- Eric Campbell's book on reporting in war zones, Absurdistan (ISBN 0-7322-7980-1), has a few chapters on Idema.
- Newsweek had a short section on Idema called "An Afghan Mystery" by John Barry and Owen Matthews in the July 26, 2004 edition.
- In February 2009, in an article entitled "Laptop may hold key to high-level scam", the Post-Tribune of Northwest Indiana wrote of a police report that Idema had attempted to obtain a laptop used by jailed military imposter Joseph A. Cafasso, also a former Fox News consultant, from the 63-year-old woman with whom Cafasso had recently been living. The woman was frightened of Idema and so turned the laptop over to police.
- On June 25, 2022, video blog Oki’s Weird Stories released a documentary about Idema, titled The King of Stolen Valor, featuring previously unseen materials and original eyewitness testimonials, on their YouTube channel.
- Soldier of Fortune Magazine had two articles, one called "U.S. Bounty Hunter On Trial In Afghanistan After A Lifetime of Skating On The Edge, Has Keith “Jack” Idema Finally Slid Over?" in November 2004 and "Down for the Count, Ten Years In An Afghan Slam!" in December 2004.

== Death ==
Idema died of AIDS on January 21, 2012, in Mexico.

== FBI investigation ==
Documents released under the FOIA show that the Department of Justice and the FBI had been conducting an active investigation of Idema from 2005.

== See also ==
- David Passaro
- Niels Holck
