= Carteret, New Jersey =

Borough in Middlesex County, New Jersey, US

- Borough
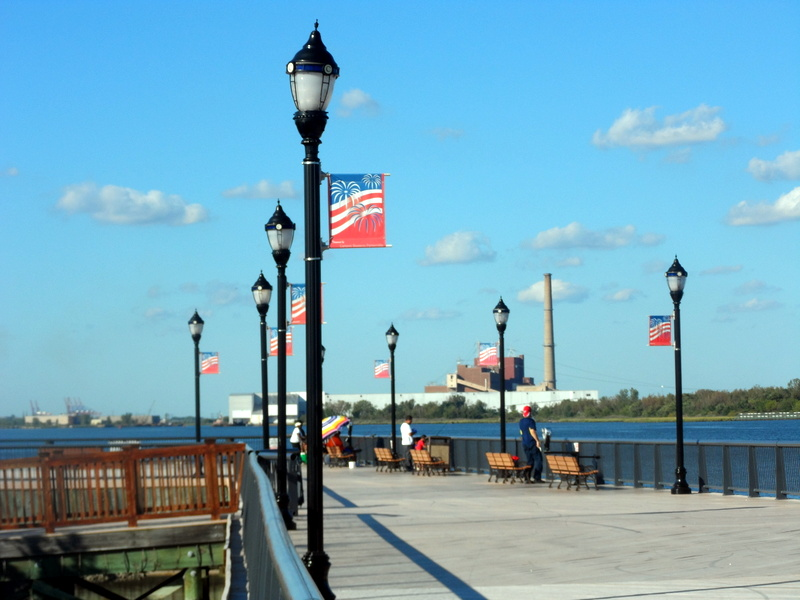
- Carteret Waterfront Park

- Seal
- Motto: The Center of it All
- Location of Carteret in Middlesex County highlighted in red (left). Inset map: Location of Middlesex County in New Jersey highlighted in orange (right).

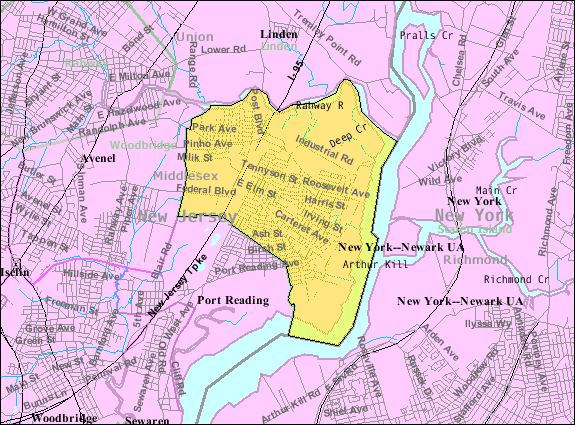
- Census Bureau map of Carteret, New Jersey.png

- Location in Middlesex County Location in New Jersey Location in the United States
- Coordinates: 40.58379°N 74.227458°W
- Country: United States
- State: New Jersey
- County: Middlesex
- Incorporated: April 11, 1906 (as Roosevelt)
- Renamed: November 7, 1922 (as Carteret)
- Named for: George Carteret and Philip Carteret

Government
  - Type: borough
  - Body: Borough Council
  - Mayor / Borough administrator: Daniel J. Reiman (D, term ends December 31, 2026)
  - Municipal clerk: Carmela Pogorzelski

Area
  - Total: 4.93 sq mi (12.77 km^{2})
  - Land: 4.39 sq mi (11.37 km^{2})
  - Water: 0.54 sq mi (1.40 km^{2}) 11.53%
  - Rank: 276th of 565 in state 15th of 25 in county
- Elevation: 13 ft (4.0 m)

Population (2020)
  - Total: 25,326
  - Estimate (2023): 25,281
  - Rank: 104th of 565 in state 12th of 25 in county
  - Density: 5,767.7/sq mi (2,226.9/km^{2})
  - Rank: 96th of 565 in state 8th of 25 in county
- Time zone: UTC−05:00 (Eastern (EST))
  - Summer (DST): UTC−04:00 (Eastern (EDT))
- ZIP Code: 07008
- Area codes: 732/848
- FIPS code: 3402310750
- GNIS feature ID: 0885181
- Website: www.carteret.net

Carteret is a borough in northeastern Middlesex County, in the U.S. state of New Jersey. As of the 2020 United States census, the borough's population reached 25,326, its highest decennial count ever and an increase of 2,482 (+10.9%) from the 2010 census count of 22,844, which in turn reflected an increase of 2,135 (+10.3%) from the 20,709 counted in the 2000 census.

== History ==
Carteret was originally created as the borough of Roosevelt on April 11, 1906, from portions of Woodbridge Township, based on the results of a referendum approved on May 22, 1906. The name was changed to Carteret as of November 7, 1922. The borough was also called Carteret during the period from December 19, 1921, to January 16, 1922. The borough was named after Sir George Carteret, one of the first proprietors of the province of New Jersey, and his son Philip Carteret, the first royal governor of New Jersey. Their name refers to the first village the De Carteret family had control over, namely Carteret in the French region of Normandy. They are also known to have controlled the island of Jersey, in the English Channel, hence the name of the State of New Jersey.

== Geography ==
According to the United States Census Bureau, the borough had a total area of 4.96 square miles (12.86 km^{2}), including 4.39 square miles (11.37 km^{2}) of land and 0.57 square miles (1.48 km^{2}) of water (11.53%).

The Rahway River forms the northern boundary of Carteret, with Linden on the other side of the river in Union County. Joseph Medwick Park is a greenway of parkland along the banks of the river. The Arthur Kill is the eastern boundary with Staten Island, New York City, New York on the opposite side. Woodbridge Township borders Carteret on all land-based boundaries.

Unincorporated communities, localities and place names located partially or completely within the borough include Canda, Chrome (in the borough's southeast), East Rahway, Lamar, Silvan Beach, South Carteret, West Carteret (the portion west of the New Jersey Turnpike) and West Chrome.

== Demographics ==
Historical population
Census	Pop.	Note	%±
1910	5,785		—
1920	11,047		91.0%
1930	13,339		20.7%
1940	11,976		−10.2%
1950	13,030		8.8%
1960	20,502		57.3%
1970	23,137		12.9%
1980	20,598		−11.0%
1990	19,025		−7.6%
2000	20,709		8.9%
2010	22,844		10.3%
2020	25,326		10.9%
2023 (est.)	25,281	▼	−0.2%
Population sources: 1910–1920; 1910 1910–1930; 1940–2000 2000; 2010 2020

Carteret's Sikh community, variously estimated at 1,000 to 2,500, is the largest concentration of Sikhs in the state. The borough hosts an annual Sikh Day parade and flag-raising ceremony. The Gurudwara Singh Sabha Sahib, the borough's first gurudwara, had rented a location in Carteret in 1998 before moving to a permanent location in the nearby Port Reading section of Woodbridge Township in 2005.

=== 2020 census ===
As of the 2020 census, Carteret had a population of 25,326. The median age was 36.8 years. 22.7% of residents were under the age of 18 and 12.5% of residents were 65 years of age or older. For every 100 females there were 94.0 males, and for every 100 females age 18 and over there were 91.5 males age 18 and over.

All residents lived in urban areas.

There were 8,387 households in Carteret, of which 38.3% had children under the age of 18 living in them. Of all households, 47.3% were married-couple households, 16.8% were households with a male householder and no spouse or partner present, and 28.7% were households with a female householder and no spouse or partner present. About 20.9% of all households were made up of individuals and 8.0% had someone living alone who was 65 years of age or older.

There were 8,809 housing units, of which 4.8% were vacant. The homeowner vacancy rate was 1.1% and the rental vacancy rate was 4.2%.

Racial composition as of the 2020 census
Race	Number	Percent
White	6,982	27.6%
Black or African American	4,111	16.2%
American Indian and Alaska Native	165	0.7%
Asian	5,797	22.9%
Native Hawaiian and Other Pacific Islander	10	0.0%
Some other race	5,040	19.9%
Two or more races	3,221	12.7%
Hispanic or Latino (of any race)	9,340	36.9%

=== 2010 census ===
The 2010 United States census counted 22,844 people, 7,591 households, and 5,686 families in the borough. The population density was 5,171.1 per square mile (1,996.6/km^{2}). There were 8,148 housing units at an average density of 1,844.4 per square mile (712.1/km^{2}). The racial makeup was 50.68% (11,577) White, 14.85% (3,393) Black or African American, 0.35% (80) Native American, 19.04% (4,349) Asian, 0.05% (12) Pacific Islander, 11.18% (2,553) from other races, and 3.85% (880) from two or more races. Hispanic or Latino of any race were 30.93% (7,066) of the population.

Of the 7,591 households, 37.1% had children under the age of 18; 50.1% were married couples living together; 19.1% had a female householder with no husband present and 25.1% were non-families. Of all households, 20.7% were made up of individuals and 8.6% had someone living alone who was 65 years of age or older. The average household size was 3.01 and the average family size was 3.51.

25.4% of the population were under the age of 18, 10.0% from 18 to 24, 28.5% from 25 to 44, 25.4% from 45 to 64, and 10.8% who were 65 years of age or older. The median age was 35.1 years. For every 100 females, the population had 94.3 males. For every 100 females ages 18 and older there were 91.0 males.

The Census Bureau's 2006–2010 American Community Survey showed that (in 2010 inflation-adjusted dollars) median household income was $58,614 (with a margin of error of +/− $5,733) and the median family income was $69,192 (+/− $10,119). Males had a median income of $47,405 (+/− $4,676) versus $42,971 (+/− $4,266) for females. The per capita income for the borough was $25,346 (+/− $2,095). About 11.8% of families and 13.0% of the population were below the poverty line, including 21.8% of those under age 18 and 11.5% of those age 65 or over.

=== 2000 census ===
As of the 2000 United States census there were 20,709 people, 7,039 households, and 5,208 families residing in the borough. The population density was 4,747.4 inhabitants per square mile (1,833.0/km^{2}). There were 7,320 housing units at an average density of 1,678.1 per square mile (647.9/km^{2}). The racial makeup of the borough was 50.7% White, 14.9% African American, 0.4% Native American, 19.0% Asian, 0.1% Pacific Islander, 11.2% from other races, and 3.9% from two or more races. Hispanic or Latino of any race were 23.4% of the population.

There were 7,039 households, out of which 35.5% had children under the age of 18 living with them, 52.1% were married couples living together, 16.6% had a female householder with no husband present, and 26.0% were non-families. 21.9% of all households were made up of individuals, and 11.1% had someone living alone who was 65 years of age or older. The average household size was 2.88 and the average family size was 3.38.

In the borough the population was spread out, with 25.2% under the age of 18, 8.4% from 18 to 24, 30.0% from 25 to 44, 21.4% from 45 to 64, and 15.0% who were 65 years of age or older. The median age was 37 years. For every 100 females, there were 94.3 males. For every 100 females age 18 and over, there were 90.0 males.

The median income for a household in the borough was $47,148, and the median income for a family was $54,609. Males had a median income of $40,172 versus $28,132 for females. The per capita income for the borough was $18,967. About 8.6% of families and 11.0% of the population were below the poverty line, including 15.8% of those under age 18 and 9.4% of those age 65 or over.

== Economy ==
Carteret Stages, a film production complex covering 1,200,000 square feet (110,000 m^{2}) and estimated to cost $1 billion, is undergoing development at the waterfront.

Portions of the borough are part of an Urban Enterprise Zone (UEZ), one of 32 zones covering 37 municipalities statewide. The borough was selected in 1994 as one of a group of 10 zones added to participate in the program and one of four of those chosen based on a competition. In addition to other benefits to encourage employment and investment within the UEZ, shoppers can take advantage of a reduced 3.3125% sales tax rate (half of the 6 5/8% rate charged statewide) at eligible merchants. Established in March 1995, the borough's Urban Enterprise Zone status expires in March 2026.

Carteret is the location of the primary data center for the NASDAQ OMX Group's stock exchange.

Carteret was the headquarters of the defunct electronics chain Nobody Beats the Wiz.

The Carteret Performing Arts Center opened in 2021.

== Government ==
=== Local government ===
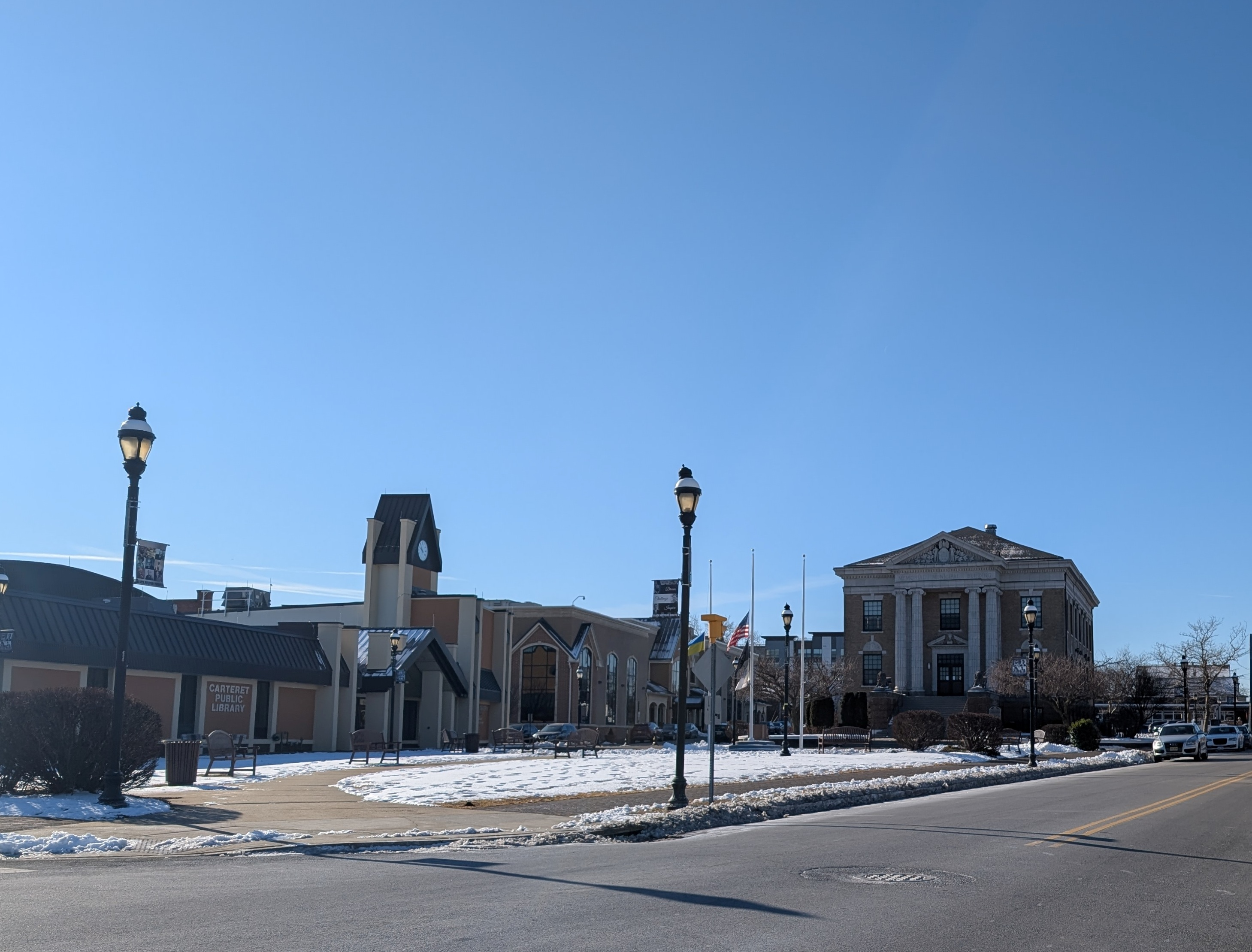
Carteret Memorial Municipal Building (right) and Public Library (left)

Carteret is governed under the borough form of New Jersey municipal government, which is used in 218 municipalities (of the 564) statewide, making it the most common form of government in New Jersey. The governing body is comprised of the mayor and the borough council, with all positions elected at-large on a partisan basis as part of the November general election. A mayor is elected directly by the voters to a four-year term of office. The borough council includes six members, who are elected to serve three-year terms on a staggered basis, with two seats coming up for election each year in a three-year cycle. The borough form of government used by Carteret is a "weak mayor / strong council" government in which council members act as the legislative body with the mayor presiding at meetings and voting only in the event of a tie. The mayor can veto ordinances subject to an override by a two-thirds majority vote of the council. The mayor makes committee and liaison assignments for council members, and most appointments are made by the mayor with the advice and consent of the council.

As of 2026, the mayor of Carteret is Democrat Daniel J. Reiman, whose term of office ends December 31, 2026. The members of the Borough Council are Council President Dennis DiMascio (D, 2027), Vincent Bellino (D, 2028), Jorge Diaz (D, 2028), Ajmar "AJ" Johal (D, 2027), Randy Krum (D, 2026) and Susan R. Naples (D, 2026).

First elected in 2002, Reiman was paid an annual salary of $102,610 in 2016, placing him 13th among the highest-paid mayors in the state. He has been elected for 6 consecutive elections, some of them unopposed.

In May 2016, the borough council selected Ajmar Singh Johal from three candidates nominated by the Democratic municipal committee to fill the seat expiring in December 2018 that became vacant following the death of Joseph W. "Skippy" Sitarz the previous month.

Members of Carteret's 13.9% South Asian community have been active in local government, serving on several governing boards and contesting elections. Members of notable activity in the government include Sultan M. Babar, an alternate member of the board of health and the head of its medical department. Babar also ran for borough council and was a candidate in the Democratic primaries. He has been chosen to represent the 10th delegate district part of Middlesex County, which consists of 18th and 19th state legislative districts, as a delegate to the 2012 Democratic National Convention. Other members of notability are Amijit Cheema, member of the Planning Board; and Hardyal Singh Johal, former member of the Planning Board.

==== Emergency services ====
The borough maintains a 50-person police department. An October 2017 report by NJ.com found that Officer Joseph Reiman, brother of Mayor Daniel Reiman, accounted for 20% of the police department's 115 arrests that involved the use of force in the two years following his July 2015 hiring.

The Carteret Volunteer First Aid Squad, established in 1934, ended operations in April 2013 after becoming financially insolvent. Starting in April 2013, emergency medical services in the borough are provided around the clock by the EMS division of the Carteret Fire Department.

The Borough of Carteret hired its first firefighter in the late 19th century. The department relied on a single paid firefighter up until 1920, when paid staff was expanded to five firefighters to operate the borough's first motorized fire truck. In the 1950s with the construction of the New Jersey Turnpike, which included an exit in Carteret, the department started to purchase trucks designed for safe operation fighting vehicle fires on busy high-speed highways.

In August 1990, a pipeline carrying jet fuel burst in Carteret. The Carteret Fire Department joined with personnel from GATX Terminals Corporation and the Middlesex County Hazardous Materials Unit to construct a temporary dike to prevent the fuel from flowing into the Arthur Kill.

Up until 2011, Carteret would request help from fireboats of the Fire Department of New York when there was a waterfront fire. In 2011, through the assistance of a FEMA Port Security Grant, the department acquired its first fireboat. The 27 feet (8.2 m) vessel cost $297,000.

In December 2014, the Courier News reported on an investigation of serious sexual harassment targeting the department's sole female firefighter.

=== Federal, state and county representation ===
Carteret is located in the 6th Congressional District and is part of New Jersey's 19th state legislative district.

For the 119th United States Congress, New Jersey's 6th congressional district is represented by Frank Pallone (D, Long Branch). New Jersey is represented in the United States Senate by Democrats Cory Booker (Newark, term ends 2027) and Andy Kim (Moorestown, term ends 2031).

For the 2026–2027 session, the 19th legislative district of the New Jersey Legislature is represented in the State Senate by Joe F. Vitale (D, Woodbridge Township) and in the General Assembly by Craig Coughlin (D, Woodbridge Township) and Yvonne Lopez (D, Perth Amboy).

Middlesex County is governed by a Board of County Commissioners, whose seven members are elected at-large on a partisan basis to serve three-year terms of office on a staggered basis, with either two or three seats coming up for election each year as part of the November general election. At an annual reorganization meeting held in January, the board selects from among its members a commissioner director and deputy director. As of 2025, Middlesex County's Commissioners (with party affiliation, term-end year, and residence listed in parentheses) are:

Director Ronald G. Rios (D, Carteret, 2027), Deputy Director Shanti Narra (D, North Brunswick, 2027), Claribel A. "Clary" Azcona-Barber (D, New Brunswick, 2025), Charles Kenny (D, Woodbridge Township, 2025), Leslie Koppel (D, Monroe Township, 2026), Chanelle Scott McCullum (D, Piscataway, 2025) and Charles E. Tomaro (D, Edison, 2026).

Constitutional officers are: Clerk Nancy Pinkin (D, 2025, East Brunswick), Sheriff Mildred S. Scott (D, 2025, Piscataway) and Surrogate Claribel Cortes (D, 2026; North Brunswick).

=== Politics ===
As of March 2011, there were a total of 12,538 registered voters in Carteret, of which 5,187 (41.4%) were registered as Democrats, 1,373 (11.0%) were registered as Republicans and 5,974 (47.6%) were registered as Unaffiliated. There were 4 voters registered as Libertarians or Greens.

United States presidential election results for Carteret
Year	Republican		Democratic		Third party(ies)	
Year	No.	%	No.	%	No.	%
2024	4,010	45.31%	4,630	52.32%	210	2.37%
2020	3,065	32.81%	6,212	66.50%	65	0.70%
2016	2,506	29.50%	5,832	68.66%	156	1.84%
2012	2,002	24.89%	5,997	74.54%	46	0.57%
2008	2,643	32.66%	5,387	66.56%	63	0.78%
2004	3,097	41.65%	4,283	57.60%	56	0.75%
2000	2,305	34.44%	4,155	62.08%	233	3.48%

In the 2012 presidential election, Democrat Barack Obama received 74.5% of the vote (5,997 cast), ahead of Republican Mitt Romney with 24.9% (2,002 votes), and other candidates with 0.6% (46 votes), among the 8,124 ballots cast by the borough's 13,032 registered voters (79 ballots were spoiled), for a turnout of 62.3%. In the 2008 presidential election, Democrat Barack Obama received 65.8% of the vote (5,387 cast), ahead of Republican John McCain with 32.3% (2,643 votes) and other candidates with 0.8% (63 votes), among the 8,182 ballots cast by the borough's 12,390 registered voters, for a turnout of 66.0%. In the 2004 presidential election, Democrat John Kerry received 57.1% of the vote (4,283 ballots cast), outpolling Republican George W. Bush with 41.3% (3,097 votes) and other candidates with 0.5% (56 votes), among the 7,495 ballots cast by the borough's 11,749 registered voters, for a turnout percentage of 63.8.

Gubernatorial election results for Carteret
Year	Republican		Democratic		Third party(ies)	
Year	No.	%	No.	%	No.	%
2025	1,710	28.59%	4,227	70.67%	44	0.74%
2021	1,516	36.54%	2,591	62.45%	42	1.01%
2017	1,188	32.17%	2,488	67.37%	17	0.46%
2013	2,112	48.24%	2,224	50.80%	42	0.96%
2009	1,938	41.70%	2,460	52.94%	249	5.36%
2005	1,452	31.71%	2,934	64.08%	193	4.21%

In the 2013 gubernatorial election, Democrat Barbara Buono received 50.8% of the vote (2,224 cast), ahead of Republican Chris Christie with 48.2% (2,112 votes), and other candidates with 1.0% (42 votes), among the 4,564 ballots cast by the borough's 13,247 registered voters (186 ballots were spoiled), for a turnout of 34.5%. In the 2009 gubernatorial election, Democrat Jon Corzine received 51.6% of the vote here (2,460 ballots cast), ahead of Republican Chris Christie with 40.7% (1,938 votes), Independent Chris Daggett with 4.5% (213 votes) and other candidates with 0.8% (36 votes), among the 4,765 ballots cast by the borough's 12,073 registered voters, yielding a 39.5% turnout.

United States Senate election results for Carteret1
Year	Republican		Democratic		Third party(ies)	
Year	No.	%	No.	%	No.	%
2024	3,089	38.60%	4,590	57.36%	323	4.04%
2018	1,909	29.38%	4,434	68.24%	155	2.39%
2012	1,628	21.76%	5,761	76.99%	94	1.26%
2006	1,365	28.95%	3,259	69.12%	91	1.93%

United States Senate election results for Carteret2
Year	Republican		Democratic		Third party(ies)	
Year	No.	%	No.	%	No.	%
2020	2,578	28.53%	6,218	68.81%	240	2.66%
2014	975	25.52%	2,788	72.97%	58	1.52%
2013	753	37.19%	1,254	61.93%	18	0.89%
2008	2,021	28.23%	4,979	69.56%	158	2.21%

== Education ==
The Carteret School District serves students in pre-kindergarten through twelfth grade. As of the 2023–24 school year, the district, comprised of six schools, had an enrollment of 4,009 students and 315.9 classroom teachers (on an FTE basis), for a student–teacher ratio of 12.7:1. Schools in the district (with 2023–24 enrollment data from the National Center for Education Statistics) are Columbus School with 625 students in grades PreK–4, Nathan Hale School with 439 students in grades PreK–4, Private Nicholas Minue School with 527 students in grades PreK–4, Carteret Middle School with 567 students in grades 5–6, Carteret Junior High School with 586 students in grades 7–8 and Carteret High School with 1,182 students in grades 9–12.

In 2016, borough voters turned down a ballot proposal to switch from an elected school board to an appointed board.

Eighth grade students from all of Middlesex County are eligible to apply to attend the high school programs offered by the Middlesex County Magnet Schools, a county-wide vocational school district that offers full-time career and technical education at its schools in East Brunswick, Edison, Perth Amboy, Piscataway and Woodbridge Township, with no tuition charged to students for attendance.

Saint Joseph School serves students in Pre-K–8 as part of Saint Joseph Roman Catholic Church and is overseen by the Roman Catholic Diocese of Metuchen.

A private rabbinical college, Yeshiva Gedola of Carteret, opened in 2006.

== Transportation ==
=== Roads and highways ===
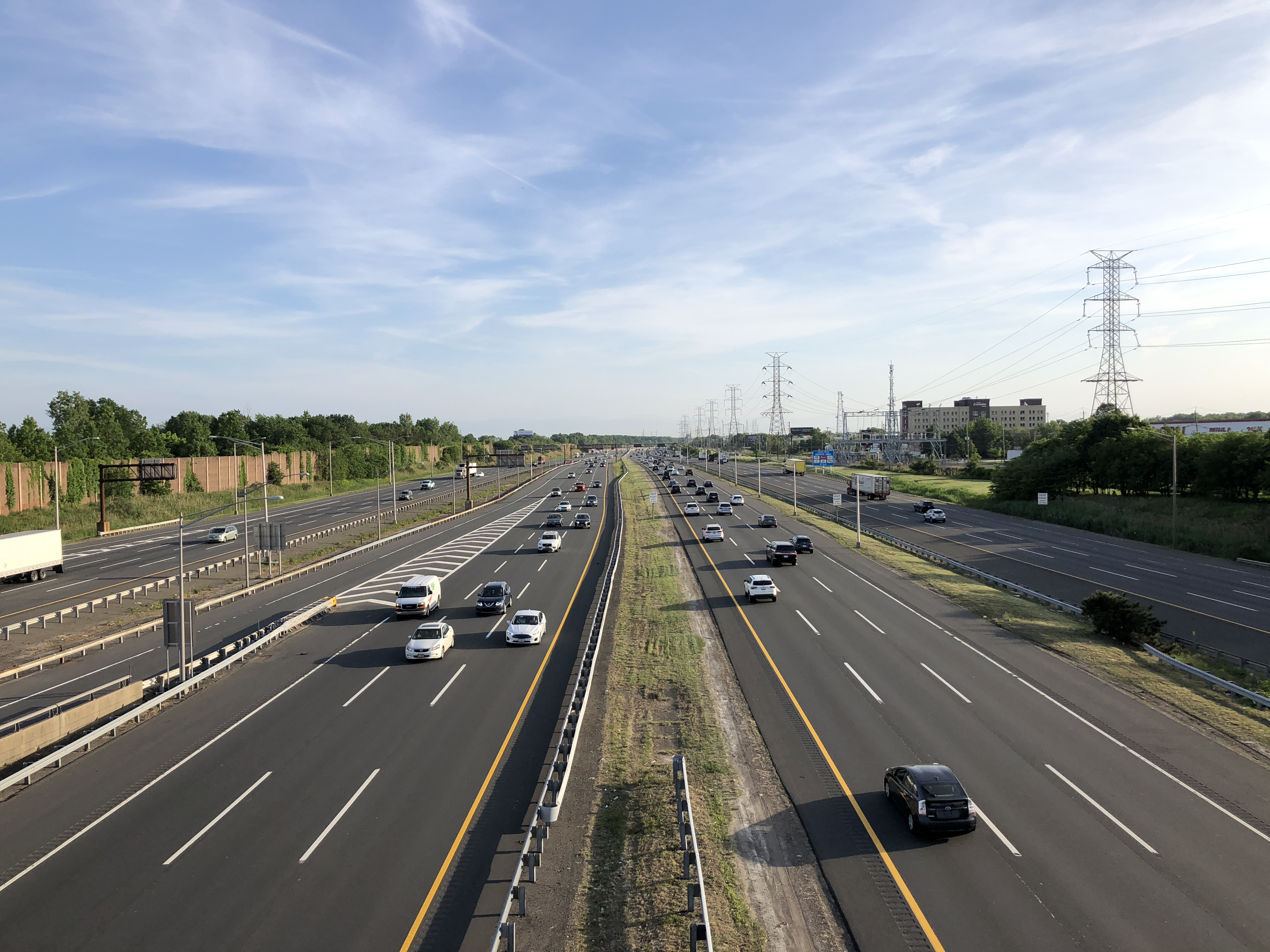
View south along the New Jersey Turnpike (Interstate 95) in Carteret

As of May 2010, the borough had a total of 59.24 miles (95.34 km) of roadways, of which 52.95 miles (85.21 km) were maintained by the municipality, 4.77 miles (7.68 km) by Middlesex County and 1.52 miles (2.45 km) by the New Jersey Turnpike Authority.

The only major road that passes through Carteret is the New Jersey Turnpike (Interstate 95). Interchange 12 of the turnpike, located in the borough, was updated as part of an $80 million project that added five additional toll lanes and new ramps to CR 602.

=== Public transportation ===
NJ Transit local bus service is provided on the 116 route to the Port Authority Bus Terminal in Midtown Manhattan, New York City and Perth Amboy, and on the 48 route to Elizabeth and Perth Amboy.

There are plans to introduce ferry service between Waterfront Park and Lower Manhattan via Arthur Kill and Kill van Kull. As of 2021, funding for the construction of a landing dock and purchase of a boat was in place. As of 2023, dredging had been completed and construction of bulkhead was underway. Mayor Daniel J. Reiman, expected the ferry terminal to be complete by 2025, but construction didn't begin until December of that year.

Ground was broken for the ferry terminal on December 12, 2025, with an anticipated opening of 2028. The terminal will feature a ticket and waiting area, retail and event space and a restaurant and bar. The terminal site will feature 700 parking spaces with a designated bus station for NJ Transit buses, municipal jitneys and for rideshare such as Uber and Lyft. The municipal Jitneys will connect to the Rahway and Woodbridge train stations.

== Notable people ==
People who were born in, residents of, or otherwise closely associated with Carteret include:

- Jim Babjak (born 1957), Dennis Diken (born 1957) and Mike Mesaros of the pop/rock group The Smithereens are former Carteret residents who met in school there
- Joseph A. Cafasso (born 1956), former Fox News consultant on military and counterterrorism issues who left the network after allegations surfaced that he misrepresented his military record
- Jim Conti, of the ska band Streetlight Manifesto
- Thomas Deverin (1921–2010), former mayor of Carteret who served 22 years in the New Jersey General Assembly
- Keith Hughes (1968–2014), basketball player at Syracuse University and Rutgers who was selected by the Houston Rockets in the 1991 NBA draft, but never played in the NBA
- Sam Kamara (born 1997), professional football defensive end for the Cleveland Browns
- Chad Kinch (1958–1994), shooting guard who played in the NBA for the Cleveland Cavaliers and Dallas Mavericks
- Isa Leshko (born 1971), artist and author of Allowed to Grow Old: Portraits of Elderly Animals from Farm Sanctuaries
- Jim McGreevey (born 1957), former Governor of New Jersey, grew up in Carteret
- Art McMahon (born 1946), defensive back for the Boston / New England Patriots football team from 1968 to 1970 and 1972
- Joe "Ducky" Medwick (1911–1975), left fielder for the St. Louis Cardinals during the "Gashouse Gang" era of the 1930s, elected to the Baseball Hall of Fame in 1968, by the Veterans Committee Ranked #7 on the Sports Illustrated list of The 50 Greatest New Jersey Sports Figures.
- Nicholas Minue (1905–1943), United States Army Private who received the Medal of Honor for military service in World War II. An elementary school on Post Boulevard is named in his honor
- Lamont O. Repollet (born 1971), educator and academic administrator who serves as the 18th president of Kean University
- Joseph Sirola (1929–2019), was an actor known as "The King of the Voice-Overs"
- Joel Weisman (1943–2009), physician who was one of the first to identify a pattern of illnesses that was ultimately diagnosed as AIDS
- Laurence S. Weiss (1919–2003), business executive and politician who served in the New Jersey Senate from 1978 to 1992
- Jason Worilds (born 1988), football player selected by the Pittsburgh Steelers in the 2010 NFL draft
