= Chrome, New Jersey =

Populated place in Middlesex County, New Jersey, US

- Unincorporated community
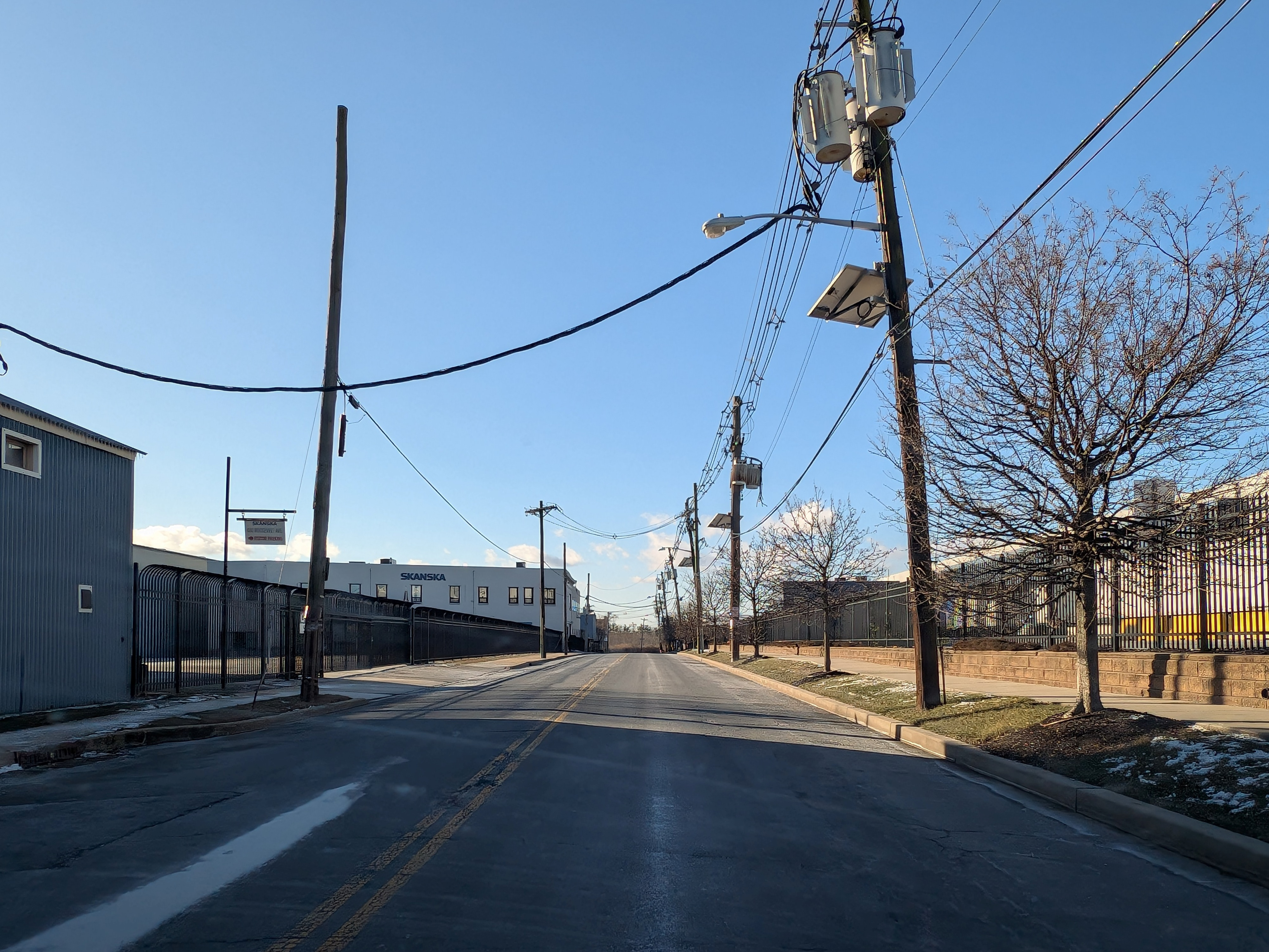
- Southbound Roosevelt Avenue (CR 602) in Chrome

- Location within Middlesex County, New Jersey Location within New Jersey Location within the United States
- Coordinates: 40°34′35″N 74°12′59″W
- Country: United States
- State: New Jersey
- County: Middlesex
- Borough: Carteret
- Elevation: 13 ft (4.0 m)
- GNIS feature ID: 875428

Chrome is an unincorporated community located within Carteret in Middlesex County, in the U.S. state of New Jersey.

The area first received the name in the mid-1900s decade due to the many steel plants in the neighborhood, including the Chrome Steel company. It and the village of Carteret seceded from Woodbridge Township in 1906 to become the borough of Roosevelt (renamed to Carteret in 1922). The neighborhood's main street was once a bustling shopping district.
