= Keith Hughes (basketball) =

American basketball player (1968–2014)

Personal information
- Born: June 29, 1968 Carteret, New Jersey, U.S.
- Died: February 8, 2014 (aged 45) Perth Amboy, New Jersey, U.S.
- Listed height: 6 ft 8 in (2.03 m)
- Listed weight: 235 lb (107 kg)

Career information
- High school: Carteret (Carteret, New Jersey)
- College: Syracuse (1986–1988); Rutgers (1989–1991)
- NBA draft: 1991: 2nd round, 47th overall pick
- Drafted by: Houston Rockets
- Playing career: 1991–2007
- Position: Power forward

Career history
- 1991–1992: Oklahoma City Cavalry
- 1992: Albany Patroons
- 1993–1994: Galatasaray
- 1994–1995: Le Havre
- 1995–1996: Poznań
- 1996: Saint-Brieuc
- 1996–1997: Pepinster
- 1997: Estudiantes de Olavarría
- 1997–1998: Unia Tarnów
- 1999: Toros de Aragua
- 1999–2000: Cherno More
- 2000–2001: Abeconsa Ferrol
- 2001: Koper mladi
- 2002–2003: BBC Nyon
- 2006–2007: BC Alvina Varna

Career highlights
- Bulgarian Cup winner (2000); Atlantic 10 Player of the Year (1991); First-team All-Atlantic 10 (1991); Second-team All-Atlantic 10 (1990)
- Stats at Basketball Reference

Keith Hughes (June 29, 1968 – February 8, 2014) was an American basketball player who played for two years at Syracuse University and then transferred to Rutgers University, before being drafted by the Houston Rockets, and subsequently being traded to the Cleveland Cavaliers, in the 1991 NBA draft.

== High school career ==
Hughes started playing basketball with Carteret High School. He was named to the New Jersey All Sophomore team 1984. In 1986, he was nominated to the McDonald's All-American Game (Top 50). He attended Five Star basketball Camp in Western Pennsylvania and was named MVP twice, and was also selected to the Nike All American 50. He was a first round draft pick for the Jersey Shore Summer Basketball League (JSBL) and led in scoring and rebounds from 1984 to 1986. Most notably, Hughes was named Player of the Year in New Jersey in 1986.

== College career ==
Hughes college career began at Syracuse University for two seasons. In his sophomore season, Hughes came off the bench, averaging 5.4 points in a limited role. He led the team in scoring in a win over St. Bonaventure University with 19 points. Seeing very little playing time, he left the team in February 1988 and transferred to Rutgers University.

After sitting out one season due to transfer rules, Hughes went on to star for Rutgers. Ranked in their first AP Poll Top 25 appearance since 1976, he led the Scarlet Knights to an NCAA Tournament Basketball appearance in 1991, losing to Arizona State in first round, 79–76.

He would score 1,257 points in two seasons (64 games) and pull down 575 rebounds, for averages of 19.6 ppg and 9.0 rpg. He was the season single scoring leader in 1989–90 and 1990–91. He would be named to the Atlantic 10 Conference second team his junior season, and the conference first team his senior season. Hughes was named Atlantic 10 Conference Men's Basketball Player of the Year in 1991. He had a career high 40 points versus Penn State to stop the nation's longest home game winning streak with a 79–78 win. In his four years of college ball, Hughes scored 1,397 points for an average of 13.6 points per game.

== Professional career ==
Hughes was drafted by the Houston Rockets in the second round (47th overall), and was traded to the Cleveland Cavaliers, in the 1991 NBA draft. After being drafted, Hughes played in the Continental Basketball Association (CBA) for one season. He began the year playing for the Oklahoma City Cavalry, then for the Albany Patroons. In 47 games, Hughes averaged 11.4 points and 9.1 rebounds per game.

Hughes began his international career in 1992 with the Argentine Club, Banco De Cordoba in Provincia, averaging 27 ppg and 10 rpg. After the team folded in 1993, he played in 2 games for Italy's Pallacanestro Viola in Reggio Calabria as a replacement player.

During the 1993–94 season, Hughes played four games in Turkey for Galatasaray Medical Park, averaging 18.2 points and 9.2 rebounds. For the 1994–95 season, he joined Le Havre in France and averaged 21.3 points and 11.5 rebounds in 20 games. He played for Poznań in Poland during the 1995–96 season.

Hughes started the 1996–97 season with French team Saint-Brieuc, where he played seven games and averaged 19.4 points and 12.3 rebounds. He then moved to Belgian team Pepinster for the rest of the season. He started the 1997–98 season with Estudiantes de Olavarría in Argentina but was released in November. In December, he signed with Unia Tarnów in Poland for the rest of the season.

In April 1999, Hughes joined Toros de Aragua in Venezuela, but left after two games.

For the 1999–2000 season, Hughes joined Cherno More in Bulgaria and played in the Saporta Cup, where he led the competition in steals with 4.6 per game. He helped the team win the Bulgarian Cup. He played for Abeconsa Ferrol in Spain during the 2000–01 season, where he averaged 11.4 points and 10.9 rebounds per game.

Hughes joined Koper mladi in Slovenia for the 2001–02 season, but left the team in December due to a knee injury. In the 2002–03 season, he played for BBC Nyon in Switzerland.

Hughes played a final season in 2006–07 for BC Alvina Varna in Bulgaria. In seven games, he averaged 14.4 points, 8.3 rebounds, 1.3 assists and 1.9 steals per game.

== Personal life ==
Keith Hughes left behind 3 sons and is remembered as a New Jersey Basketball legend.

== Death ==
Hughes died in his Perth Amboy home on February 8, 2014, at the age of 45.

== Sources ==
- Profile — TheDraftReview.com
- — Orangehoops.org
- — Eurobasket.com
- – ESPN
- Scarletknights.com
