= Isa Leshko =

American fine art photographer (born 1971)

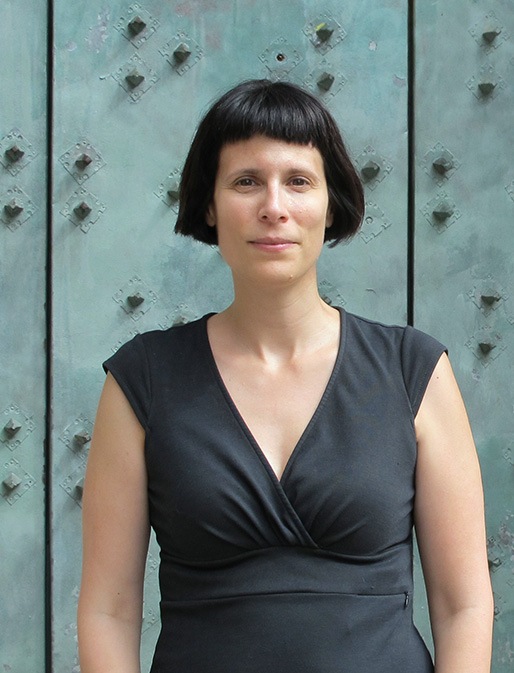
- Born: 1971 (age 54–55)
- Education: Haverford College
- Known for: Fine art photography
- Website: isaleshko.com

Isabell Carmella Leshko (born 1971) is an American fine art photographer best known for her Elderly Animals series which focuses on animal rights, aging and mortality.

== Life ==
Leshko grew up in Carteret, New Jersey in an Italian-American working-class family. She received her bachelor's degree from Haverford College, where she studied cognitive psychology, neurobiology, and gender studies.

Her work has been published in The Atlantic, The Boston Globe, The Guardian, Harper's Magazine, and The New York Times.

Leshko began traveling to animal sanctuaries across the country, photographing elderly farm animals that rarely live out their full natural lifespans. She started this series after caring for her mother who had Alzheimer's disease. This series provided an outlet for dealing with her grief and also became a commentary on commonly held assumptions about aging and animals in their later years. Some of the animals are factory farm rescues, others are pets.

She has exhibited her work widely in the United States, including shows at the Griffin Museum of Photography, the Houston Arts Alliance, the Houston Center for Photography, the Museum of Fine Arts, Houston, the Photographic Resource Center, and the Silver Eye Center for Photography. Her prints are in the collections of the Boston Public Library, the Harry Ransom Center, and the Museum of Fine Arts, Houston. She has received fellowships from the Culture & Animals Foundation, the Houston Center for Photography, the Millay Colony for the Arts, and the Silver Eye Center for Photography.

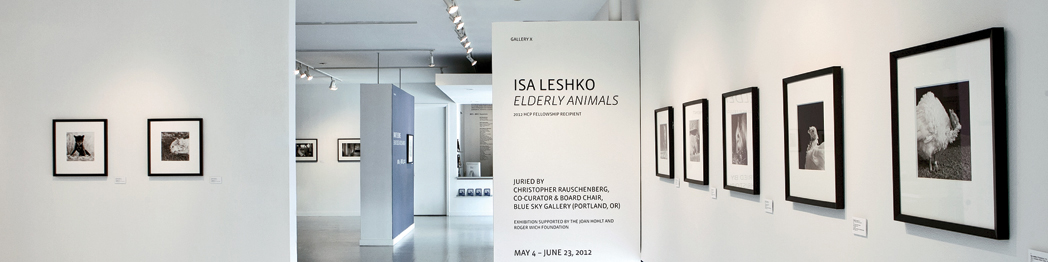
Elderly Animals Installation, Fellowship Exhibition at the Houston Center for Photography, 2012
