= Joseph A. Cafasso =

American military imposter

Joseph Anthony Cafasso Jr.
- Born: August 2, 1956 (age 70); Carteret, New Jersey
- Occupation: Former consultant

Joseph Anthony Cafasso Jr. (born August 2, 1956) is an American former Fox News consultant on military and counterterrorism issues who left the network in 2002 after it was discovered he was a military imposter. Cafasso claimed to have been a retired Special Forces lieutenant colonel who was a Vietnam War veteran and recipient of the Silver Star, but his official service records showed he had been administratively separated in 1976 during basic training after 44 days.

== Early life ==
Born in 1956 to Joseph A. Cafasso Sr. and Giovanna "Jenny" Cafasso (née Mosca), Cafasso was raised in Carteret, New Jersey. He has four sisters and one brother. Cafasso graduated from Carteret High School before enlisting in the Army in 1976.

== TWA Flight 800 investigation ==
In the late 1990s, Cafasso became involved with events following the crash of TWA Flight 800 through his association with the Associated Retired Aviation Professionals (ARAP), an organization founded by William S. Donaldson that claimed to be conducting its own independent investigation into the cause of the crash. Some time thereafter, members of the group began questioning Cafasso's military background, and, according to Donaldson, Cafasso would not produce his official record when requested to do so. As a result, Donaldson disassociated his organization from Cafasso.

== Political activities ==
Prior to his employment with Fox News, Cafasso had worked for the Pat Buchanan 2000 presidential campaign, fundraising and running petition drives. Official campaign finance records show that Cafasso was being reimbursed by the Buchanan campaign committee for travel and other expenses.

He also became involved with a humanitarian organization led by Serbian-American activist David Vuich that was seeking to help people in Yugoslavia in the aftermath of the 1999 NATO bombing of Yugoslavia.

== Departure from Fox News ==
Cafasso had claimed to have been a retired lieutenant colonel in the Special Forces, a veteran of the Vietnam War, a recipient of the Silver Star, and a participant in Operation Eagle Claw. However, his official military record indicated that he served only 44 days in the U.S. Army from May to June 1976, being administratively separated from the service.

Around the time the New York Times was developing a story about Cafasso he sent the newspaper an email claiming that his leaving Fox News was tantamount to "political assassination by a group of self-centered individuals with their own political agendas."

Cafasso appeared briefly in Outfoxed: Rupert Murdoch's War on Journalism, the 2004 documentary film that made the argument that Fox News had a right-wing bias. In it he delivers a short comment on decision-making at the network, comparing it to what he calls the "Christian fundamentalist movement".

In an interview published in a companion book to the film, Cafasso hinted at seeing evidence of "right-wing religious extremism" at the network, and claimed that Fox vice president and Washington, D.C. bureau chief Kim Hume once asked him whether he was "an angel."

== Religious activities ==
According to a 2007 article published in the Simpson County News, under the nickname "Jay", Cafasso was referenced as Director of Development for Mendenhall Ministries in Mendenhall, Mississippi, and was investigated by the local authorities who discovered that he had a long history of using many pseudonyms, claiming credentials he did not have, and claiming illness. In that article, Mendenhall Mayor Neely is quoted as saying that the last time he had seen him, Cafasso said he was going to St. Dominic's to have his gall bladder removed. The article concludes "It is suspected warrants exist for him under other names" and urges "anyone with information regarding this man" to contact the Simpson County Sheriff or a Mendenhall Police investigator.

== Arrests ==
Cafasso was arrested January 21, 2009 in Porter County, Indiana on a failure to appear warrant. He had previously been arrested in Porter County in 2008 for speeding, driving with a suspended license, and giving false information to police and did not appear as scheduled to address those charges. The alias he had been using in Indiana was "Robert Stormer"; the authenticity of Stormer's identity had previously been challenged by a journalist in October 2007. His other alleged aliases mentioned in news coverage are "Jay Mosca" and "Gerry Blackwood" and the Internet handle "Shipdude", allegedly used on dating sites.

At the time of his arrests, Cafasso had been living with a 63-year-old woman whom he had befriended under a false name via a dating site. According to her son, Cafasso defrauded her of her life savings. After Cafasso's January arrest, convicted criminal Jack Idema, who spoke as a consultant on one occasion for a local Fox News affiliate, attempted to obtain a laptop computer that had been used by Cafasso from the woman he had been living with. She surrendered it to police. The social security number Cafasso gave police at the time of his arrest belonged to a 13-year-old girl living in Rhode Island. Cafasso also reportedly told the arresting officer that he was hiding from the CIA and the FBI.
