= West Carteret, New Jersey =

Populated place in Middlesex County, New Jersey, US

- Unincorporated community
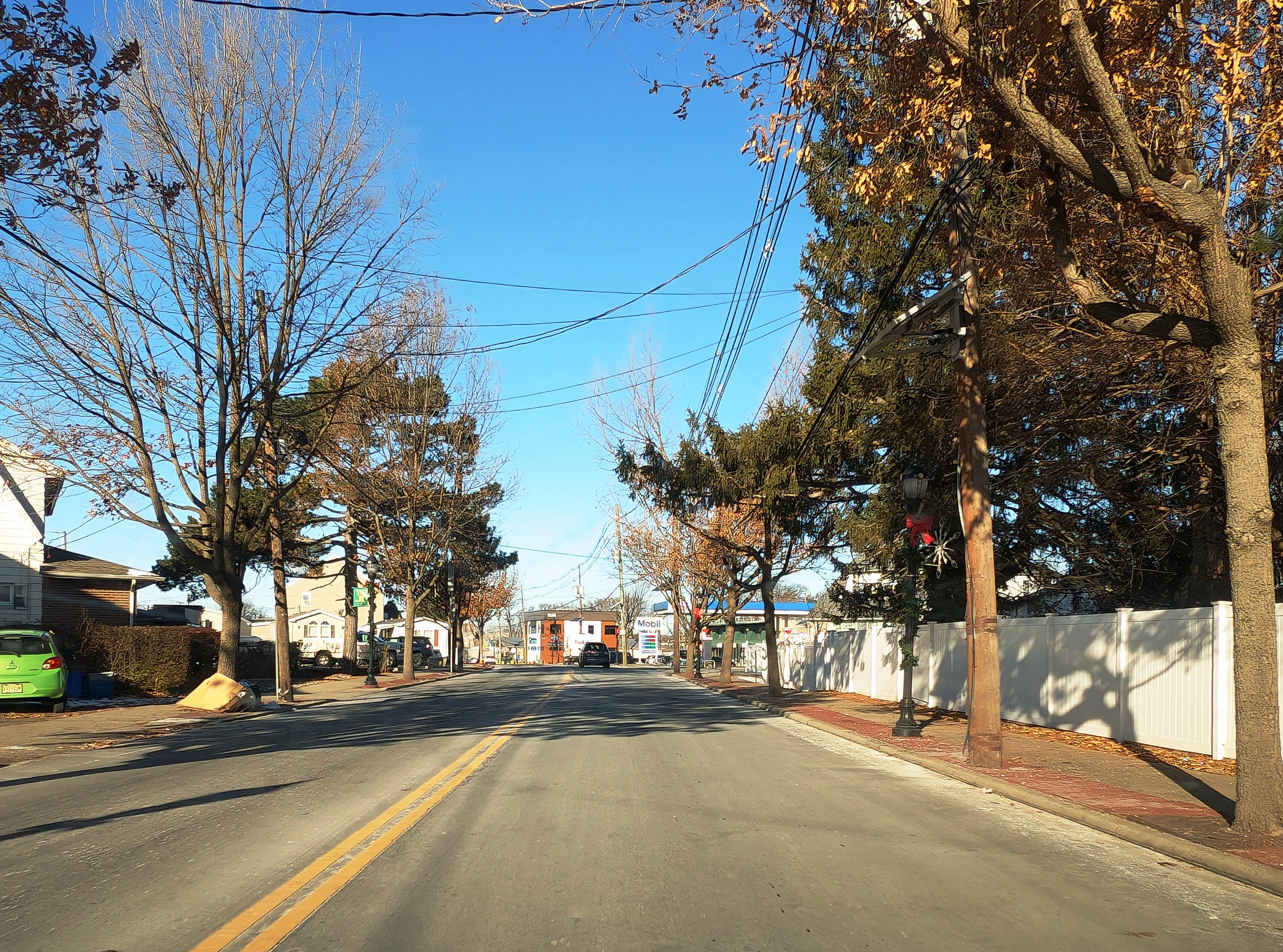
- Westbound Roosevelt Avenue (CR 602) in West Carteret

- Location of West Carteret in Middlesex County Inset: Location of county within the state of New Jersey West Carteret (New Jersey) West Carteret (the United States)
- Coordinates: 40°35′40″N 74°14′47″W
- Country: United States
- State: New Jersey
- County: Middlesex
- Borough: Carteret
- Elevation: 30 ft (9.1 m)
- GNIS feature ID: 881691

West Carteret is an unincorporated community located within Carteret in Middlesex County, in the U.S. state of New Jersey. Joseph Medwick Park is a greenway of parkland along the banks the Rahway River.
