= Carteret High School =

High school in Middlesex County, New Jersey, US

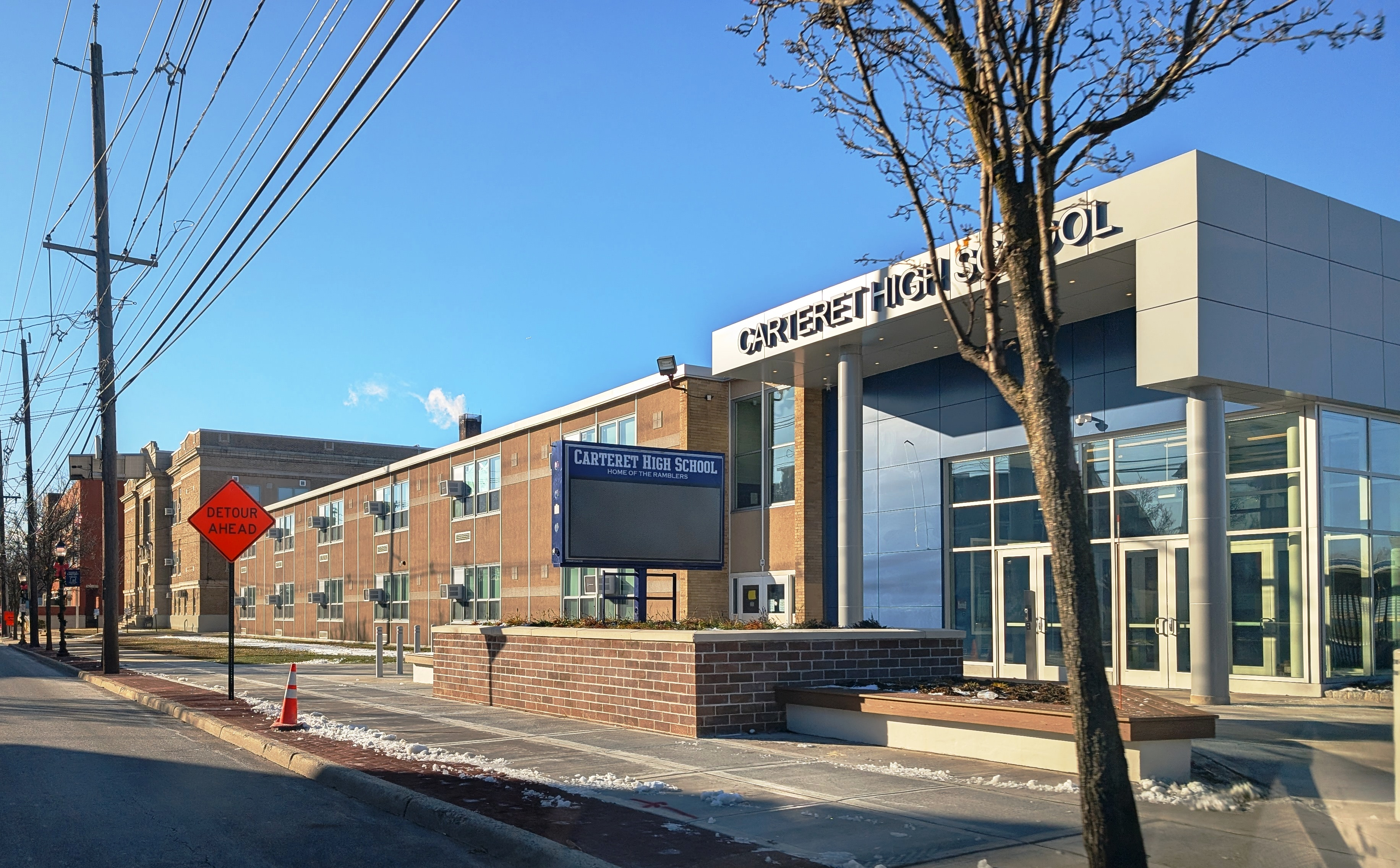

Location
- 199 Washington Avenue; Carteret, Middlesex County, New Jersey 07008; United States; 40.580765°N 74.22697°W

Information
- Type: Public high school
- Established: 1929
- School district: Carteret School District
- NCES School ID: 340282003268
- Principal: Joanna Joaquin
- Faculty: 87.2 FTEs
- Grades: 9–12
- Enrollment: 1,188 (as of 2024–25)
- Student to teacher ratio: 13.6:1
- Colors: Royal blue and white
- Athletics conference: Greater Middlesex Conference (general); Big Central Football Conference (football)
- Team name: Ramblers
- Rival: Perth Amboy High School
- Accreditation: Middle States Association of Colleges and Schools
- Yearbook: Loudspeaker
- Website: Official website

Carteret High School is a four-year comprehensive public high school that serves students in ninth through twelfth grades from Carteret in Middlesex County, in the U.S. state of New Jersey, as the lone secondary school of the Carteret School District. The school has been accredited by the Middle States Association of Colleges and Schools Commission on Elementary and Secondary Schools since 1929 and is accredited through January 2027.

As of the 2024–25 school year, the school had an enrollment of 1,188 students and 87.2 classroom teachers (on an FTE basis), for a student–teacher ratio of 13.6:1. There were 749 students (63.0% of enrollment) eligible for free lunch and 114 (9.6% of students) eligible for reduced-cost lunch.

In 2019, 18% of students achieved proficiency in mathematics and 44% in reading. The graduation rate was 82%.

Advanced Placement (AP) courses are offered in AP Biology, AP Calculus AB/BC, AP Computer Science A, AP Computer Science Principles, AP English Language and Composition, AP English Literature and Composition, AP Human Geography, AP Physics 1, AP Psychology, AP Statistics, AP Spanish, AP US History. The Project Acceleration Program allows students to receive college credit from Seton Hall University and over 200 other colleges and universities. Schedule permitting, students may also dual enroll, allowing students to earn college credits by attending classes at Middlesex County College.

== Awards, recognition and rankings ==
The school was the 261st-ranked public high school in New Jersey out of 339 schools statewide in New Jersey Monthly magazine's September 2014 cover story on the state's "Top Public High Schools", using a new ranking methodology. The school had been ranked 296th in the state of 328 schools in 2012, after being ranked 302nd in 2010 out of 322 schools listed. The magazine ranked the school 272nd in 2008 out of 316 schools. The school was ranked 312th in the magazine's September 2010 issue, which surveyed 332 schools across the state. Schooldigger.com ranked the school 270th out of 367 public high schools statewide in its 2010 rankings (an increase of 17 positions from the 2009 rank) which were based on the combined percentage of students classified as proficient or above proficient on the language arts literacy and mathematics components of the High School Proficiency Assessment (HSPA).

== Athletics ==
The Carteret High School Ramblers compete in the Greater Middlesex Conference, which is comprised of public and private high schools located in the Middlesex County area and operates under the supervision of the New Jersey State Interscholastic Athletic Association (NJSIAA). With 770 students in grades 10–12, the school was classified by the NJSIAA for the 2019–20 school year as Group III for most athletic competition purposes, which included schools with an enrollment of 761 to 1,058 students in that grade range. The football team competes in Division 3 of the Big Central Football Conference, which includes 60 public and private high schools in Hunterdon, Middlesex, Somerset, Union and Warren counties, which are broken down into 10 divisions by size and location. The school was classified by the NJSIAA as Group III North for football for 2024–2026, which included schools with 700 to 884 students.

School colors are royal blue and white. Sports offered include softball, bowling (men and women), track and field spring (men and women), soccer (men and women), basketball (men and women), football, tennis (women), wrestling (men) and baseball (men).

The boys' basketball team won the Group III state championship in 1932 vs. Weehawken High School by a final score of 28-27 and the Group II title in 1934 with a 42–38 victory over Ramsey High School in the tournament final.

The boys track team won the indoor track Group III state championship in 1973 and the Group II title in 1987.

The boys track team won the Group III spring / outdoor track state championship in 1973.

The football team won the NJSIAA state sectional championships in Central Jersey Group III in 1976 and in Central Jersey Group II in 1992, 1996, 2007 and 2012. The 1976 team won the Central Jersey Group III sectional title in front of a hometown crowd of 4,500 with a 29–22 win against Long Branch High School in the championship game. In 1992, the team became the first in program history to finish the season with no ties or losses, ending the season 11-0 after winning the Central Jersey Group II title with a 14–0 win against Princeton High School, one of the team's five shutouts that season; the 1991 team earned consideration from the Courier News as one of "the best in GMC history". The 2007 football team won the Central Jersey, Group II state sectional title by a score a 20–14 over Rumson-Fair Haven High School in the tournament championship game played at Rutgers Stadium; The win was Carteret's fourth sectional title, and its first since 1996. The 2012 football team went undefeated at 12-0 and were crowned Central Jersey Group II champions as well, defeating Weequahic High School by the score of 13–12 in the championship game played at Metlife Stadium. Dating back to 1927, Carteret has had a Thanksgiving Day football rivalry with Perth Amboy High School that was listed at 8th on NJ.com's 2017 list "Ranking the 31 fiercest rivalries in N.J. HS football". Perth Amboy lead the rivalry with a 46-42-2 overall record as of 2017.

The boys track team won the indoor relay championship in Group II in 1987.

The 1990 baseball team finished the season with a record of 21-2 after coming back to defeat Hanover Park High School and win the Group II state championship by a score of 13–7 in nine innings in the tournament final.

The boys bowling team won the overall state championship in 2005 with a pinfall of 2,988, which was 29 pins more than Bordentown Regional High School in second place.

The girls bowling team won the Group II state championship in 2008.

== Administration ==
The principal is Joanna Joaquin. Her administration team includes two vice principals.

== Controversy ==
Nicholas Sysock, then vice principal, was suspended without pay in October 2012 after being charged with possession of child pornography. After pleading guilty to a single count of possession of child pornography, Syscock was sentenced in August 2013 to three years in prison and has limits on his access to children after his release.

== Notable alumni ==
- Jim Babjak (born 1957), founding member of The Smithereens
- Joseph A. Cafasso (born 1956), former Fox News consultant on military and counterterrorism issues who left the network after allegations surfaced that he misrepresented his military record
- Dennis Diken (born 1957, class of 1975), founding member of The Smithereens
- Keith Hughes (1968-2014), former professional basketball player who coached the Carteret High School basketball team for one season
- Sam Kamara (born 1997), football defensive end for the Cleveland Browns of the National Football League
- Art McMahon (born 1946, class of 1964), defensive back who played for the Boston / New England Patriots football team from 1968 to 1970 and 1972
- Joe Medwick (1911-1975), left fielder for the St. Louis Cardinals who was inducted into the National Baseball Hall of Fame and Museum in 1968
- Mike Mesaros (class of 1975), founding member of The Smithereens
- Lamont O. Repollet (born 1971), educator and academic administrator who serves as the 18th president of Kean University
- Laurence S. Weiss (1919–2003), business executive and politician who served in the New Jersey Senate from 1978 to 1992
- Jason Worilds (born 1988), outside linebacker for the Pittsburgh Steelers
