= Sam Kamara =

American football player (born 1997)

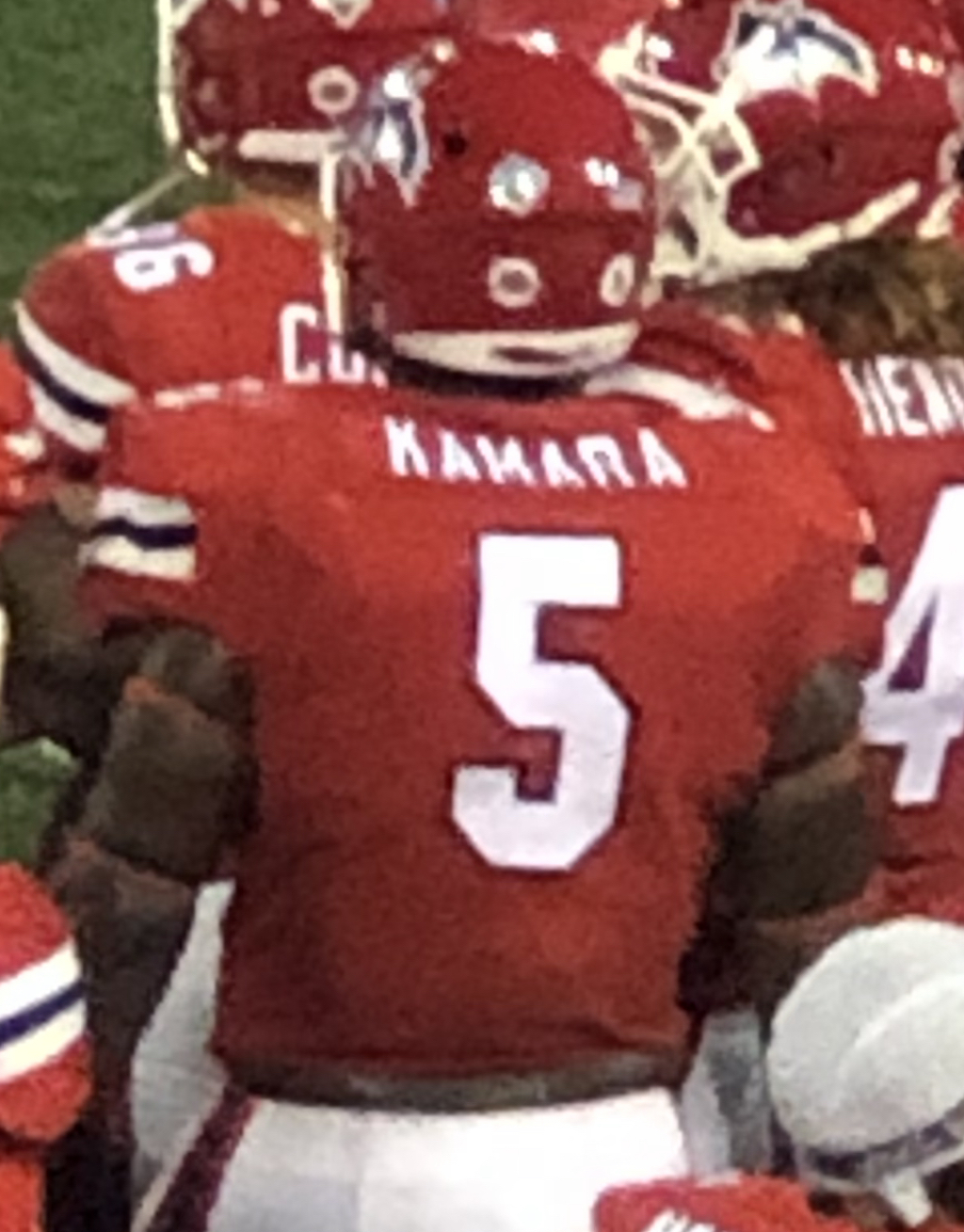
- Kamara at Stony Brook in 2019

No. 92 – Cleveland Browns
- Position: Defensive end
- Roster status: Active

Personal information
- Born: December 21, 1997 (age 28); Carteret, New Jersey, U.S.
- Listed height: 6 ft 0 in (1.83 m)
- Listed weight: 272 lb (123 kg)

Career information
- High school: Carteret
- College: Stony Brook (2016–2020)
- NFL draft: 2021: undrafted

Career history
- Chicago Bears (2021); Cleveland Browns (2022–present)

Awards and highlights
- First-team All-CAA (2020); Second-team All-CAA (2018)

Career NFL statistics as of 2026
- Total tackles: 46
- Sacks: 1
- Pass deflections: 1
- Stats at Pro Football Reference

Sam Kamara (born December 21, 1997) is an American professional football defensive end for the Cleveland Browns of the National Football League (NFL). Kamara played college football for the Stony Brook Seawolves.

== Early life ==
Kamara was raised in Carteret, New Jersey. He attended Carteret High School, where he played on both sides of the ball, also scoring seven touchdowns as the team's fullback. Kamara earned first-team All-Conference honors as well as the Mini Max award, a New Jersey accolade based on performance, academic achievement and community service. His head coach compared him favorably to fellow Carteret standout Jason Worilds, a second-round draft pick from Virginia Tech in 2010. Although Kamara earned FCS offers from colleges including Maine, Monmouth and Stony Brook, the only FBS school to show interest in him was Pittsburgh.

== College career ==
Kamara played in eight games in his freshman season in 2016, making three starts. His first career start came on October 29, 2016, against New Hampshire, where he became the first true freshman to start a game for Stony Brook in the season. In his sophomore season, Kamara started all thirteen games at defensive end, recording 31 tackles and a sack.

Kamara led the team with nine sacks in his 2018 junior season, also recording 42 tackles with 11.5 for loss. He set a collegiate career high with seven tackles against Air Force, and also recorded six tackles and 2.5 sacks against Southeast Missouri State in the first round of the FCS playoffs. He was named second-team All-Colonial Athletic Association (CAA) after the season. Before his senior season, Kamara was named one of three team captains by head coach Chuck Priore and saw his name floated as a potential NFL draft pick, with NFLPA scouting director Dane Vandernat declaring that Kamara "possesses all the physical attributes that pro scouts require." However, he played only five games before suffering a shoulder injury and missing the rest of the season. Kamara was granted a waiver by the NCAA to return for a fifth year in 2020, but the season was postponed to the spring as a result of the COVID-19 pandemic. In the shortened spring season, Kamara recorded 12 tackles and two sacks in three games, earning first-team All-CAA honors as a defensive lineman.

=== College statistics ===
Year	Team	GP	Defense				
Year	Team	GP	Tackles	For Loss	Sacks	Int	FF
2016	Stony Brook	8	9	0.5	0	0	0
2017	Stony Brook	13	31	4.5	1.0	0	0
2018	Stony Brook	12	42	11.5	9.0	0	0
2019	Stony Brook	5	16	4.5	3.0	0	0
2020	Stony Brook	3	12	3.0	2.0	0	2
College totals		41	110	24.0	15.0	0	2

== Professional career ==
Pre-draft measurables
Height	Weight
6 ft 1 in (1.85 m)	275 lb (125 kg)
Values from Pro Day

=== Chicago Bears ===
Kamara signed with the Chicago Bears following the 2021 NFL draft as an undrafted free agent. Designated as the fourth-string linebacker in the team's first depth chart, Kamara made his preseason debut on August 14, 2021, against the Miami Dolphins. He ended preseason with six tackles, three quarterback hits and a sack. He was waived on August 31, 2021, and re-signed to the practice squad the next day. Kamara was promoted to the active roster on October 12 due to a season ending injury to teammate Jeremiah Attaochu.

Kamara made his NFL debut on October 17 against the Green Bay Packers and recorded his first tackle on Aaron Jones. He was waived by the team on November 3 and re-signed to the practice squad. He was flexed to the active roster ahead of the Bears' Monday Night Football game against the Pittsburgh Steelers and recorded two tackles in his first multi-tackle game. Kamara was flexed to the active roster for the Bears' Thanksgiving game against the Detroit Lions, where he was Chicago's third-highest graded defensive player before exiting the game with a concussion. Kamara was placed on the reserve/COVID-19 list on December 14. He was signed to the active roster on December 23. He recorded a career-high three tackles against the New York Giants on January 2. Kamara had his first tackle for loss and pass deflection on January 9 against the Minnesota Vikings. He ended his rookie season playing eight games, recording 10 tackles with one tackle-for-loss, and one pass deflection.

On August 30, 2022, Kamara was waived by the Bears and signed to the practice squad the next day. He was released on September 9.

=== Cleveland Browns ===
On October 4, 2022, Kamara was signed to the Cleveland Browns' practice squad. He played in one game in the for the team in Week 18 against the Pittsburgh Steelers. He signed a reserve/future contract with Cleveland on January 9, 2023.

On August 29, 2023, Kamara was waived by the Browns and re-signed to the practice squad. He was signed to the active roster on December 12. Kamara was released on December 29 and re-signed to the practice squad on January 2, 2024. Kamara was signed to the active roster on January 5. Kamara recorded seven tackles in the season finale against the Cincinnati Bengals.

On August 27, 2024, Kamara was waived by the Browns and re-signed to the practice squad. He was promoted to the active roster on September 11. He was waived on October 8, and signed to the practice squad the next day. He was promoted back to the active roster on November 16. In Week 18, Kamara led the Browns with six tackles against the Baltimore Ravens. He ended the season with 15 tackles.

On August 26, 2025, Kamara was released by the Browns as part of final roster cuts and re-signed to the practice squad the next day. He was signed to the active roster on December 2.

On March 24, 2026, Kamara re-signed with the Browns. He was released by Cleveland as a part of final roster cuts on August 30. On September 1, Kamara was re–signed to the Browns' practice squad. He was elevated to the active roster for Week 5 against the New York Jets, where Kamara recorded his first career sack, against Geno Smith. He was signed to the active roster on November 7.

== NFL career statistics ==
Year	Team	Games		Tackles					Interceptions						Fumbles	
Year	Team	GP	GS	Comb	Solo	Ast	Sack	TFL	PD	Int	Yds	Avg	Lng	TD	FF	FR
2021	CHI	8	0	10	7	3	0.0	1	1	0	0	0.0	0	0	0	0
2022	CLE	1	0	0	0	0	0.0	0	0	0	0	0.0	0	0	0	0
2023	CLE	2	0	7	4	3	0.0	1	0	0	0	0.0	0	0	0	0
2024	CLE	11	1	15	10	5	0.0	1	0	0	0	0.0	0	0	0	0
2025	CLE	4	1	6	3	3	0.0	3	0	0	0	0.0	0	0	0	0
2026	CLE	2	1	8	5	3	1.0	1	0	0	0	0.0	0	0	0	0
Career		28	3	46	29	17	1.0	7	1	0	0	0.0	0	0	0	0
