= Carteret Performing Arts Center =

Nonprofit theater in New Jersey, U.S.

- CPAC, CarteretPAC, Carteret Performing Arts & Events Center
- Location: 46 Washington Street; Carteret, New Jersey, U.S.
- Capacity: 2,200
- Type: Performing arts center

Construction
- Opened: 2021

Website
- carteretpac.com

The Carteret Performing Arts Center (also known as the Carteret Performing Arts & Events Center, CarteretPAC or CPAC) is a not-for-profit 50,000-square-foot theater and events center in Carteret, New Jersey that opened in 2021.

== Background ==
The building contains a 500-seat black box theater, a 1,600-plus-seat main auditorium/theater, and a 5,000-square-foot art gallery that wraps around the building, as well as an open-air rooftop terrace that holds approximately 200 people.

== History ==
CPAC was built on the site of the Ritz Theatre, which opened in 1927 with actor George Sidney in Lost at the Front and four acts of live vaudeville. The theater closed in 1965 and was used as a clothing factory and, in later years, as a bakery. Vacant by 2014, the theater was demolished in August 2017 after it was determined a new building would be required rather than restoration. The newly built, "state-of-the-art" venue opened in December 2021.

== Programming ==
Carteret natives The Smithereens played the opening concert at the venue.

== See also ==
- List of New Jersey music venues by capacity
- Avenel Performing Arts Center
