= Edward Caraballo =

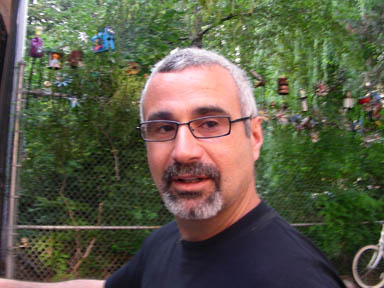
- Born: c. 1961 (age 64–65); Bronx, New York City
- Occupation: Video Journalist
- Website: http://www.edcaraballo.com

Edward Caraballo (born c. 1961) is an American videographer and investigative photojournalist, specializing in covert photography. He was arrested in Afghanistan in 2004 while documenting the exploits of a vigilante group led by U.S. mercenary Jonathan "Jack" Idema. Caraballo was implicated as an associate of Idema and was charged with entering the country illegally (later dropped), running a private prison, and torture. He was sentenced to an eight-year prison term (later reduced on appeal to two years) and incarcerated in Afghanistan's Pul-e-Charkhi prison.

Throughout his trial and imprisonment, Caraballo insisted that he was not involved in the alleged torture, and was officially embedded in what he believed was a legitimate military operation.

While in prison, Caraballo sought to distance himself from Idema and eventually converted to Islam. He has said his conversion was initially a survival tactic in prison in order to gain the respect of Afghan inmates.

There was at least one attempt on his life while he was incarcerated and that he was almost lynched during a prison riot started by other inmates with suspected links to the Taliban and al Qaeda. Caraballo used a satellite phone to call CNN journalist Anderson Cooper as the riot was occurring to say his life was in danger. One prison official, claiming that Caraballo was "never in danger" during the riot despite threats made against him, questioned why he refused to accept offers of protection and emerge from his cell. However, Caraballo has emphatically stated that he refused to leave the relative security of his cell because of the chaotic and dangerous situation still happening inside cellblock. Still, Caraballo managed to make peace with one of the prisoners who he said had tried to seize the prison and helped teach a few inmates and guards some English.

In April 2006, Afghan President Hamid Karzai granted Caraballo a presidential pardon, two months before his sentence was scheduled to end. Caraballo has since returned to the United States.

== Career ==
Caraballo has worked for most of the major broadcast news outlets in the U.S., including, ABC News, CBS News, CNN and National Geographic. In 1992 and 1993, while working for WWOR-TV's "I-team" with reporter Joe Collum and producer Gary Scurka, Caraballo won four local Emmy awards: the "Outstanding Editing" award at the 35th Annual New York Emmy Awards and three awards at the 36th Annual New York Emmy Awards one for "Outstanding Single News Feature" (as a producer for a piece entitled "HOT SPOTS (PT.1)" on the Channel 9 News, November 21, 1991), one for "Outstanding Issues Programming"(as a producer for a documentary called "Crime Chronicles," and one for "Outstanding Editing". He is currently working on a documentary film and book about his experiences in Afghanistan.
