= Knightsbridge International =

US-based non-government organization

Knightsbridge International is a US-based non-governmental organization based in West Hills, California that provides humanitarian assistance and disaster relief to regions around the world. KBI was founded in 1995 by members of an American priory of the Knights of Malta. Past missions include relief efforts in Afghanistan during Operation Enduring Freedom and after 2004 Boxing Day tsunami disaster. The organization was the subject of a 2006 documentary film Beyond the Call, and a 2008 book entitled A Prescription For Peace.
