= Jason Worilds =

American football player (born 1988)

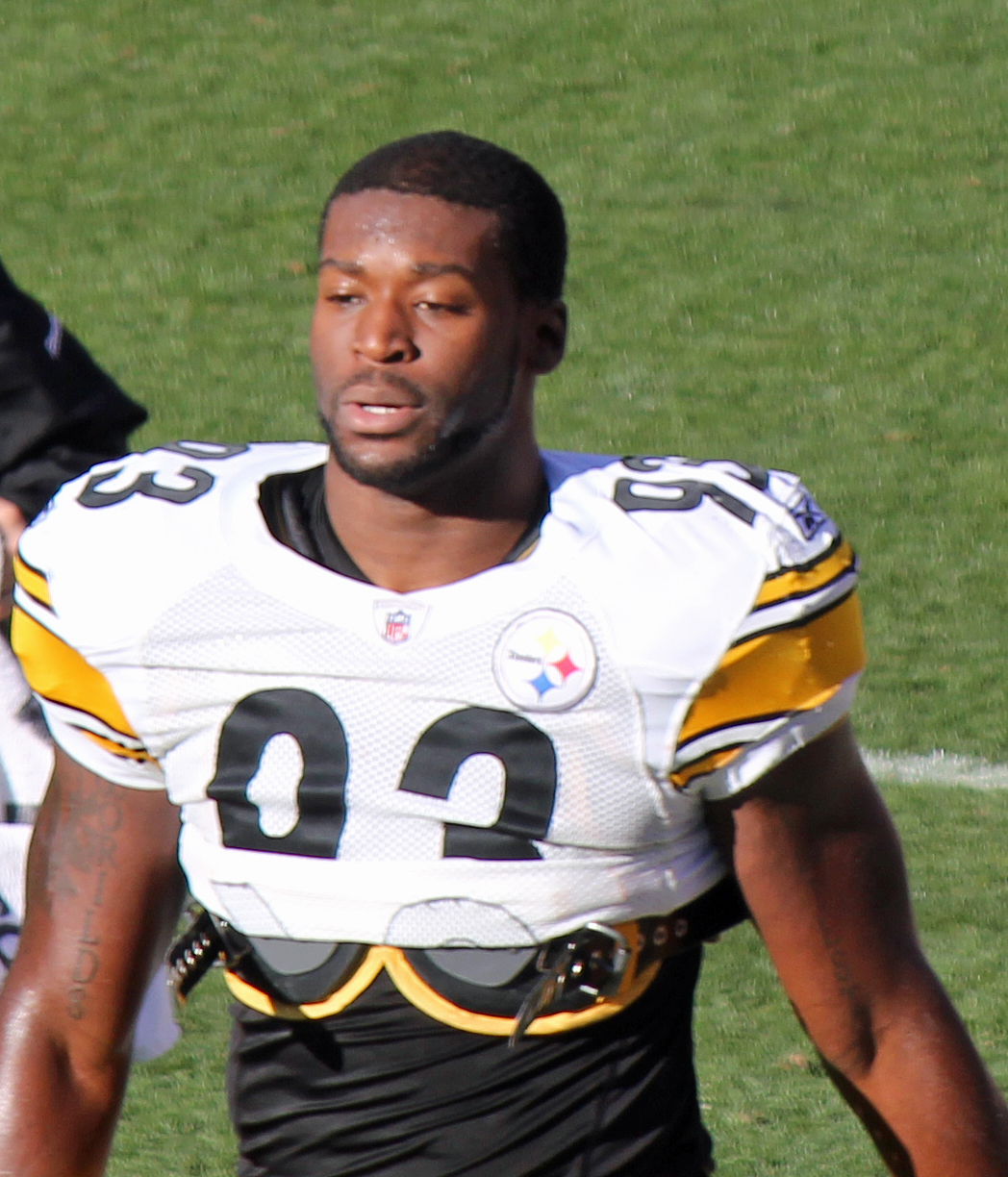
- Worilds with the Pittsburgh Steelers in 2012

No. 97, 93
- Position: Linebacker

Personal information
- Born: March 3, 1988 (age 38); Rahway, New Jersey, U.S.
- Listed height: 6 ft 2 in (1.88 m)
- Listed weight: 262 lb (119 kg)

Career information
- High school: Carteret (Carteret, New Jersey)
- College: Virginia Tech (2006–2009)
- NFL draft: 2010: 2nd round, 52nd overall pick

Career history
- Pittsburgh Steelers (2010–2014)

Awards and highlights
- 2× Second-team All-ACC (2008, 2009)

Career NFL statistics
- Total tackles: 204
- Sacks: 25.5
- Forced fumbles: 4
- Fumble recoveries: 3
- Interceptions: 1
- Stats at Pro Football Reference

Jason Adjepong Worilds (born March 3, 1988) is an American former professional football player who was a linebacker for the Pittsburgh Steelers of the National Football League (NFL). He played college football for the Virginia Tech Hokies and was selected by the Steelers in the second round of the 2010 NFL draft. He retired during the prime of his career to become one of Jehovah’s Witnesses.

== Early life ==
Worilds attended Carteret High School in Carteret, New Jersey where he was a two-sport athlete in football and track. He played on the defensive line as well as linebacker and fullback. During his junior year, he posted 87 tackles, 22 of them for a loss and 12 sacks. On the opposite side of the ball, he had 61 carries for 330 yards and four touchdowns. He earned Associated Press All-State honors. His success continued on into his senior year in which he had 107 tackles, 18 for a loss and 10 sacks, again earning All-State honors and becoming the first player in school history to have the honor in consecutive honors.

Coming out of high school, Worilds was rated the seventh best strongside defensive end by Rivals.com. He was ranked the eight best in the country from scout.com.

== College career ==
Worilds began by seeing the field in two games on defense and special teams. He blocked a punt against the North Carolina Tar Heels and returned it for seven yards. After though, he elected to have season-ending shoulder surgery and was granted a medical red-shirt. Worilds picked up where he left off in 2007, and had two quarterback hurries in the opener against East Carolina University. In a game against Ohio, Worilds suffered a high-ankle sprain and missed the following game against William & Mary. The next season, he started 12 games and played in 13 games. He was 4th on his team in tackles with 62. His 21 quarterback hurries led the Hokies. Jason posted 7 tackles against Virginia Tech's bitter rivals, University of Virginia. However, he had to sit out of the Orange Bowl because of a shoulder injury. In 2009, Worlids started in all of Virginia Tech's 13 games. During that time, he recorded 49 tackles, 11 tackles for loss, 4.5 sacks, 1 pass broken up, 1 pass defended, 1 forced fumble, 42 quarterback hurries, and a whopping 32 quarterback hits. After his junior year, Worilds decided to declare for the 2010 NFL Draft. He finished his college career with 41 games played, 25 games started, 132 tackles (62 solo tackles), 34 tackles for loss, 15.00 sacks, 2 pass break-ups, 2 passes defended, 67 quarterback hits, 3 forced fumbles, and 1 blocked kick.

== Professional career ==
Pre-draft measurables
Height	Weight	Arm length	Hand span	40-yard dash	10-yard split	20-yard split	20-yard shuttle	Three-cone drill	Vertical jump	Broad jump	Bench press
6 ft 1 in (1.85 m)	254 lb (115 kg)	32 7/8 in (0.84 m)	9 1/4 in (0.23 m)	4.72 s	1.62 s	2.71 s	4.29 s	6.95 s	38 1/2 in (0.98 m)	9 ft 8 in (2.95 m)	24 reps
All values from NFL Combine

The Pittsburgh Steelers selected Worilds in the second round (52nd overall) of the 2010 NFL draft. On March 3, 2014, he signed his $9.754 million transition tender to stay with Pittsburgh.

"I appreciate all of the interest from the organizations that have reached out to us the past few days, with that being said, after much thought & consideration I have chosen to step away from football as I have opted to pursue other interests. I am especially grateful of the opportunity to play before some of the greatest fans in football today. Despite any concern and speculation that may ensue, I appreciate those that are respectful of my decision."

— Jason Worilds

On March 11, 2015, Worilds unexpectedly announced his retirement from the NFL at the age of 27 and after five years as a Pittsburgh Steeler. The choice to retire surprised many due to the start of the free agency period starting the day prior. He became an unrestricted free agent for the first time in his career and was expected to receive a $7-$8 million salary with at least $15 million guaranteed. Worilds chose to retire to dedicate his life to Jehovah God as one of Jehovah's Witnesses.

He finished his career with 25.5 career sacks.

=== NFL statistics ===
Year	Team	GP	COMB	TOTAL	AST	SACK	FF	FR	FR YDS	INT	IR YDS	AVG IR	LNG	TD	PD
2010	PIT	14	17	12	5	2.0	0	1	0	0	0	0	0	0	0
2011	PIT	12	38	27	11	3.0	1	0	0	0	0	0	0	0	0
2012	PIT	16	27	23	4	5.0	0	0	0	0	0	0	0	0	2
2013	PIT	15	63	43	20	8.0	2	0	0	0	0	0	0	0	1
2014	PIT	16	59	39	20	7.5	1	2	0	1	30	30	30	0	2
Career		73	204	144	60	25.5	4	3	0	1	30	30	30	0	5
