= From Jersey It Came! The Smithereens Anthology =

Compilation album by The Smithereens
- Released: September 7, 2004
- Recorded: 1980–1999
- Genre: Rock
- Length: 2:16:40
- Label: Capitol

The Smithereens chronology
God Save The Smithereens (1999)	From Jersey It Came! The Smithereens Anthology (2004)	Extended Versions (2006)

Professional ratings
Review scores
Source	Rating
AllMusic	4/5 stars
The Encyclopedia of Popular Music	4/5 stars

From Jersey It Came! The Smithereens Anthology is a two-disc, career-spanning compilation album by the Smithereens, released in 2004. It features most of the band's singles, as well as album and EP tracks, non-album B-sides and a handful of rarities.

== Overview ==
The album contains 39 songs spanning 1980 to 1999, and includes five previously unreleased tracks: a 1980 demo of "Elaine"; the surf rock instrumental, "Back to Balboa"; a 1987 live recording of "White Castle Blues"; an alternate mix of "Cut Flowers"; and a 1992 demo of "Love is Gone".

Also included are an alternate mix of "Everything I Have Is Blue", which was only released as a promotional single; two B-sides, "One After 909" and an instrumental mix of "If You Want the Sun to Shine"; and The Smithereens' version of "Downbound Train", originally recorded for the Bruce Springsteen tribute album, One Step Up/Two Steps Back: The Songs of Bruce Springsteen.

== Track listing ==
Adapted from the album's liner notes.

All tracks written by Pat DiNizio, except where noted.

=== Disc one ===
1. "Girls About Town" — 2:53
  - from Girls About Town EP (1980)
2. "Back to Balboa" (Jim Babjak, Dennis Diken, DiNizio, Mike Mesaros) — 1:58
  - previously unreleased; recorded summer 1982 at Rock Bite Studio, New York City
3. "Much Too Much" (Diken, DiNizio)— 2:24
  - from Beauty and Sadness EP (1983); 1988 remix by Ed Stasium
4. "Beauty and Sadness" — 3:24
  - from Beauty and Sadness EP (1983); 1988 remix by Ed Stasium
5. "Blood and Roses" — 3:35
  - from Especially for You (1986)
6. "Strangers When We Meet" — 3:45
  - from Especially for You (1986)
7. "In a Lonely Place" — 4:04
  - from Especially for You (1986)
8. "Behind the Wall of Sleep" — 3:24
  - from Especially for You (1986)
9. "White Castle Blues" (Live) (Babjak, Robert Banta) — 7:42
  - previously unreleased; recorded live May 22, 1987 at The Stone Pony, Asbury Park, New Jersey; album version originally released as bonus track from Especially for You (1986)
10. "Cigarette" — 2:27
  - from Especially for You (1986)
11. "Crazy Mixed-Up Kid" — 2:07
  - from Especially for You (1986)
12. "Time and Time Again" — 3:06
  - from Especially for You (1986)
13. "Something New" — 1:56
  - from Green Thoughts (1988)
14. "Only a Memory" — 3:43
  - from Green Thoughts (1988)
15. "If the Sun Doesn't Shine" — 3:32
  - from Green Thoughts (1988)
16. "Drown in My Own Tears" — 3:12
  - from Green Thoughts (1988)
17. "Especially for You'" (Babjak, DiNizio) — 3:07
  - from Green Thoughts (1988)
18. "House We Used to Live In" — 4:03
  - from Green Thoughts (1988)
19. "Elaine" (1980 Demo) — 3:00
  - previously unreleased; recorded early 1980 at Odyssey Studio, Long Branch, New Jersey
20. "Elaine" — 2:33
  - from Green Thoughts (1988)
21. "One After 909" (John Lennon, Paul McCartney) — 3:36
  - B-side to "Top of the Pops" (1991); recorded during the Green Thoughts sessions, December 1987

=== Disc two ===
1. "A Girl Like You" — 4:42
  - from 11 (1989)
2. "Blues Before and After" — 3:15
  - from 11 (1989)
3. "Blue Period" — 2:57
  - from 11 (1989)
4. "Yesterday Girl" — 3:27
  - from 11 (1989)
5. "Cut Flowers" (Honeys Mix) (Babjak, DiNizio) — 3:00
  - previously unreleased; alternate mix – album version from 11 (1989)
6. "Baby Be Good" — 3:20
  - from 11 (1989)
7. "Now and Then" (Babjak) — 3:50
  - from Blow Up (1991)
8. "Too Much Passion" — 4:35
  - from Blow Up (1991)
9. "Tell Me When Did Things Go So Wrong" — 2:22
  - from Blow Up (1991)
10. "If You Want the Sun to Shine" (Instrumental) (DiNizio, Julian Lennon) — 5:50
  - B-side to "Too Much Passion" (1992); album version from Blow Up (1991)
11. "Top of the Pops" — 4:32
  - from Blow Up (1991)
12. "Evening Dress" — 3:12
  - from Blow Up (1991)
13. "Miles from Nowhere" — 4:18
  - from A Date with The Smithereens (1994)
14. "Love is Gone" (Babjak Studio Demo) (Babjak) — 3:38
  - previously unreleased; recorded December 1992 at Trax East Recording Studio, South River, New Jersey; album version from A Date with The Smithereens (1994)
15. "Everything I Have Is Blue" (Guitar Mix) — 4:21
  - promotional single (1994); remix by Sean Slade and Paul Q. Kolderie; album version from A Date with The Smithereens (1994)
16. "She's Got a Way" (Babjak, Diken, DiNizio, Mesaros, Danny Tate) — 3:24
  - from God Save The Smithereens (1999)
17. "Downbound Train" (Bruce Springsteen) — 3:48
  - recorded 24 January 1997 at Chicago Recording Company, Chicago, Illinois; from One Step Up/Two Steps Back: The Songs of Bruce Springsteen (1997)
18. "I Believe" (Babjak, Diken, DiNizio, Mesaros, Tate) — 3:12
  - from God Save The Smithereens (1999)

== Personnel ==
Credits adapted from the album's liner notes.

The Smithereens

- Pat DiNizio – lead vocals, guitar
- Jim Babjak – guitar, backing vocals, lead vocals (Disc one, track 9; disc two, track 14)
- Dennis Diken – drums, percussion, backing vocals
- Mike Mesaros – bass, backing vocals

Additional musicians

- Marshall Crenshaw – Hammond organ and piano (Disc one, track 6)
- Jeffrey Berman – vibraphone (Disc one, track 7)
- Frank Christian – acoustic guitar (Disc one, track 7)
- Suzanne Vega – vocals (Disc one, track 7)
- Joe Kernich – piano (Disc one, track 8)
- Kenny Margolis – keyboards, piano, organ, accordion, harpsichord
- Don Dixon – piano, guitar, percussion, backing vocals
- Marti Jones – backing vocals (Disc one, track 13)
- Steve Berlin – saxophone (Disc one, track 17)
- Maria Vidal – backing vocals (Disc two, track 1)
- Michael Hamilton – guitar, keyboards, Mellotron
- Belinda Carlisle – vocals (Disc two, track 3)
- Gerri Sutyak – cello (Disc two, track 3)
- Ed Stasium – backing vocals, percussion
- The Honeys – backing vocals (Disc two, tracks 5, 6)
- The Cowsills – backing vocals (Disc two, track 7)
- Diana Graselli – backing vocals (Disc two, tracks 8, 11)
- Alex Acuña – percussion (Disc two, track 8)
- Sid Paige, Joel Derouin, Berj Garabedian, Michele Richards – violin (Disc two, track 8)
- Larry Corbett, Suzie Katayama, Melissa Hasin – cello (Disc two, track 8)
- David Campbell – String arrangements (Disc two, tracks 8, 10)
- Kevin Savigar – keyboards (Disc two, track 10)
- Maria Vidal – backing vocals (Disc two, track 11)
- The Grip Weeds – backing vocals (Disc two, track 14)
- Bill Maryniak – organ (Disc two, track 17)

Production personnel

- The Smithereens – producer (Disc one, track 1; disc two, tracks 13, 15)
- Andy Shernoff – producer (Disc one, track 2)
- Alan Betrock – producer (Disc one, tracks 3, 4)
- Don Dixon – producer (Disc one, tracks 5–8, 10–18, 20, 21; disc two, tracks 13, 15), liner notes
- Ed Stasium – producer (Disc two, tracks 1–12)
- Lou Giordano – associate producer (Disc two, tracks 13, 15)
- Jim Babjak – producer (Disc two, track 14)
- Don Fleming – producer (Disc two, tracks 16, 18)
- Mike Mesaros – producer (Disc two, track 17)
- David English – compilation producer
- Dennis Diken – supervising producer, track annotations
- Kevin Bartley – mastering
- Diana Barnes – art direction
- Bill Merryfield – design
- Tim Gabor – illustrations
- Michael Halsband – photography
- Deborah Feingold – photography
