= The Best of The Smithereens =

Compilation album by The Smithereens
- Released: August 15, 1997
- Recorded: 1985–1991
- Genre: Rock
- Length: 38:36
- Label: EMI, Capitol
- Producer: Don Dixon, Ed Stasium

The Smithereens chronology
Attack of The Smithereens (1995)	The Best of The Smithereens (1997)	God Save The Smithereens (1999)

Alternative cover

Professional ratings
Review scores
Source	Rating
AllMusic	3.5/5 stars

The Best of The Smithereens is a compilation album by Carteret, New Jersey–based rock band The Smithereens, released in 1997.

== Track listing ==
All tracks are written by Pat DiNizio.

No.	Title	Original album	Length
1.	"Strangers When We Meet"	Especially for You, 1986	3:47
2.	"Only a Memory"	Green Thoughts, 1988	3:45
3.	"A Girl Like You"	11, 1989	4:42
4.	"Behind the Wall of Sleep"	Especially for You	3:24
5.	"Blood and Roses"	Especially for You	3:38
6.	"Yesterday Girl"	11	3:29
7.	"In a Lonely Place"	Especially for You	4:13
8.	"Too Much Passion"	Blow Up, 1991	4:32
9.	"Drown in My Own Tears"	Green Thoughts	3:11
10.	"House We Used to Live In"	Green Thoughts	4:02

== Personnel ==
The Smithereens

- Pat DiNizio – vocals, guitar
- Jim Babjak – guitar
- Dennis Diken – drums
- Mike Mesaros – bass
