= Attack of the Smithereens =

Compilation album by The Smithereens
- Released: 21 November 1995
- Recorded: 1980–1992
- Genre: Rock
- Length: 79:40
- Label: Capitol
- Producer: The Smithereens, Don Dixon, Ed Stasium, Andy Shernoff, Michael Hamilton

The Smithereens chronology
A Date with The Smithereens (1994)	Attack of the Smithereens (1995)	The Best of The Smithereens (1997)

Professional ratings
Review scores
Source	Rating
AllMusic	4/5 stars

Attack of the Smithereens is a rarities compilation album by The Smithereens, released in 1995 by Capitol Records. It contains a number of B-sides and rare tracks as well as previously unreleased demos and live recordings.

== Track listing ==
Adapted from the album's liner notes.

All songs by Pat DiNizio, except where noted.

1. "Here Come the Smithereens" – 0:28
  - 1945 Smith College women's choir
2. "Girl Don't Tell Me" (Live) (Brian Wilson) – 2:32
  - Previously unreleased; recorded live in March 1980 at Englander's Bar, Hillside, New Jersey.
3. "Girls About Town" – 2:48
  - From the Girls About Town EP; released 31 October 1980; recorded August–September 1980 at Chelsea Sound Studios, New York City, New York.
4. "Time and Time Again" (Band demo) – 2:31
  - Previously unreleased; recorded February 1980 at Quality Sound Studio, Plainfield, New York.
5. "Don't Be Cruel" (Live) (Otis Blackwell, Elvis Presley) – 2:41
  - Otis Blackwell backed by The Smithereens; previously unreleased; recorded live 1983 at Folk City, New York City.
6. "Hang Ten High" (Dominic Frontiere) – 2:15
  - From the various artists compilation album The East Coast 60's Rock & Roll Experiment; released in 1986; recorded summer 1982 at Rock Bite Studios, New York City.
7. "Tracey's World" (Live) – 4:24
  - Previously unreleased; in-store live performance recorded 1 October 1983 at Capitol Records record store, Hartford, Connecticut.
8. "Blood and Roses" (Demo) – 1:18
  - Previously unreleased; recorded January 1985 at Pat's apartment, New York City
9. "Blood and Roses" (Band demo) – 3:23
  - Previously unreleased; recorded 1985 at Pat's Dad's house, Scotch Plains, New Jersey
10. "Just a Little" (Live) (Ron Elliott, Bob Durand) – 2:43
  - Sal Valentino and Declan Mulligan of The Beau Brummels backed by The Smithereens; previously unreleased; recorded live autumn 1985 at Irving Plaza, New York City
11. "The Seeker" (Pete Townshend) – 3:20
  - B-side to "Only a Memory", released 6 April 1988; recorded spring 1987 at the Record Plant, New York City.
12. "Yesterday Girl" (4-track home demo) – 2:08
  - Previously unreleased; recorded 1988 at Pat's house, Upstate New York.
13. "Poor Little Pitiful One" – 3:33
  - B-side to "Top of the Pops", released 23 September 1991; recorded during sessions for Blow Up, spring 1991 at A&M Studios and Brooklyn Recording Studios, Hollywood, Los Angeles, California.
14. "Maria Elena" (Acoustic) – 2:44
  - B-side to "Blues Before and After", released 24 January 1990; recorded summer 1989 at Rumbo Recorders, Los Angeles; original version from 11.
15. "You Really Got Me" (Live) (Ray Davies) – 3:46
  - Ray and Dave Davies backed by The Smithereens; previously unreleased; recorded live 22 November 1991 at Boston Garden, Boston, Massachusetts.
16. "One After 909" (John Lennon, Paul McCartney) – 3:36
  - B-side to "Top of the Pops", released 23 September 1991; recorded during sessions for Green Thoughts in December 1987 at Capitol Studio B, Hollywood, Los Angeles.
17. "World Keeps Going 'Round" (Ray Davies) – 2:40
  - B-side to "Too Much Passion", released 10 February 1992; recorded during sessions for Blow Up, spring 1991 at A&M Studios and Brooklyn Recording Studios, Hollywood, Los Angeles.
18. "Behind the Wall of Sleep" (Live) – 4:02
  - B-side to "Yesterday Girl", released 20 June 1990; recorded 13 December 1989 at National Video Center, New York City for MTV Unplugged.
19. "Something Stupid" (C. Carson Parks) – 2:46
  - B-side to "Get a Hold of My Heart", released 18 May 1992; recorded during sessions for Green Thoughts in December 1987 at Capitol Studio B, Hollywood, Los Angeles.
20. "Shakin' All Over" (Johnny Kidd) – 4:06
  - B-side to "Top of the Pops", released 23 September 1991; recorded during sessions for Blow Up, spring 1991 at A&M Studios, Hollywood, Los Angeles.
21. "Rudolph, The Red-Nosed Reindeer" (Johnny Marks) – 3:03
  - Released as promotion only CD single on 30 November 1992 and on the various artists compilation album, Classic Rockin' Christmas, in 1993; recorded summer 1992 at the Chicago Recording Company, Chicago, Illinois.
22. "Ruler of My Heart" (Naomi Neville) – 3:03
  - B-side to "House We Used to Live In", released 1988; recorded during sessions for Green Thoughts in December 1987 at Capitol Studio B, Hollywood, Los Angeles.
23. "It Don't Come Easy" (Richard Starkey) – 3:12
  - B-side to "Too Much Passion", released 10 February 1992; recorded during sessions for Blow Up, spring 1991 at A&M Studios and Brooklyn Recording Studios, Hollywood, Los Angeles.
24. "Lust For Life" (Iggy Pop, David Bowie) – 5:08
  - B-side to "Only a Memory", released 1988; recorded during sessions for Green Thoughts in December 1987 at Capitol Studio B, Hollywood, Los Angeles.
25. "Like Someone in Love" – 3:59
  - B-side to "A Girl Like You", released 18 October 1989; recorded during sessions for 11, spring-summer 1989 at American Recorders and Rumbo Recorders, Los Angeles.
26. "A Girl Like You" (Strip Club Version) – 3:29
  - B-side to "A Girl Like You", released 18 October 1989; recorded summer 1989 at Crystal Studios, New York City.

== Personnel ==
Adapted from the album's liner notes and Discogs.

The Smithereens

- Pat DiNizio – lead vocals, guitar
- Jim Babjak – guitar, vocals, co-lead vocals (16), lead vocals (17), drums (26)
- Dennis Diken – drums, vocals, lead vocals (2)
- Mike Mesaros – bass, vocals

Additional musicians

- Ken Jones – bass (2, 4)
- Otis Blackwell – lead vocals (5)
- Sal Valentino – lead vocals (10)
- Declan Mulligan – guitar (10)
- Ray Davies – lead vocals, guitar (15)
- Dave Davies – guitar (15)
- Kenny Margolis – accordion (14), electric piano (16), piano (23)
- Graham Parker – lead vocals (18)
- Marti Jones – co-lead vocal (19)
- Don Dixon – piano (22)
- Ray Anderson – trombone (26)
- Michael 'Tone' Hamilton – guitar (26)

Technical

- The Smithereens – production (3, 4, 6, 11, 13, 17, 20, 23, 26)
- Andy Shernoff – production (6)
- Jim T. Bradt – recorded by (7)
- Ed Stasium – production (13, 14, 20, 25)
- Don Dixon – production (16, 19, 22, 24)
- Michael 'Tone' Hamilton – production (17, 23)
- Kevin Reeves – mastering
- Wayne Watkins – project director
- Cheryl Pawelski – compilation producer, compiled by
- Dan Stout – sonic restoration
- Tommy Steele – art direction
- Everett Peck – illustrations
- Jeffrey Fey – design
- Pat DiNizio – liner notes
- Dennis Diken – liner notes
