= Live in Concert! Greatest Hits and More =

Live album by The Smithereens
- Released: May 27, 2008
- Recorded: January 30–February 2, 2008
- Venue: Court Tavern, New Brunswick, New Jersey
- Genre: Rock, power pop
- Length: 78:24
- Label: Koch Records
- Producer: Pat DiNizio, Jim Babjak, Dennis Diken, Kurt Reil

The Smithereens chronology
Christmas with The Smithereens (2007)	Live in Concert! Greatest Hits and More (2008)	B-Sides The Beatles (2008)

Professional ratings
Review scores
Source	Rating
Allmusic	link
PopMatters	7/10 stars
Contactmusic.com	9/10 stars

Live in Concert! Greatest Hits and More is a live album by New Jersey rock band The Smithereens, released in 2008 by Koch Records.

The album features music from The Smithereens' four-night stint at The Court Tavern in New Brunswick, New Jersey, which took place January 30 - February 2, 2008. The band, all hailing from surrounding Central Jersey towns, played the Court Tavern often at the start of their career. Jim Babjak: "There's no doubt the Court Tavern was our Cavern Club, so it was a natural choice". The band charged only $5 for admission, the same price as when they used to play there in the early 1980s. Kurt Reil of The Grip Weeds recorded all four nights on his portable studio equipment and later mixed the best performances at his House of Vibes studio.

In addition to the band's best-known songs, the album features live recordings of two Pat DiNizio solo songs, "Any Other Way" and "Since You Went Away", originally released on his 2007 album, Pat DiNizio. The set also includes Buddy Holly's "Well All Right", and an interpretation of the "Batman Theme", a live staple for the band. Though the album's 11 minute version of "House We Used to Live In" wasn't planned, according to Babjak, the song always had an extended ending for live shows. "When I thought I was about to wrap up the jam at what is now the halfway point, Pat pulled out a harmonica", Babjak explained. "This surprise added a whole new dimension and I was thrilled when I heard the results. The chemistry between the four of us was really strong that night. Luckily, this spontaneous jam was captured on tape".

== Track listing ==
All songs written by Pat DiNizio, except where noted.

No.	Title	Writer(s)	Length
1.	"Behind the Wall of Sleep"		3:27
2.	"Drown in My Own Tears"		3:14
3.	"Miles from Nowhere"		4:04
4.	"Room Without a View"		4:40
5.	"Only a Memory"		4:53
6.	"House We Used to Live In"		10:58
7.	"Spellbound"		4:18
8.	"Since You Went Away"		2:56
9.	"She's Got a Way"	Jim Babjak, Dennis Diken, DiNizio, Mike Mesaros, Danny Tate	3:21
10.	"Yesterday Girl"		3:28
11.	"Well All Right"	Norman Petty, Buddy Holly, Jerry Allison, Joe B. Mauldin	2:38
12.	"Especially For You"	Babjak, DiNizio	3:28
13.	"Any Other Way"		4:03
14.	"Top of the Pops"		4:06
15.	"Time and Time Again"		4:08
16.	"Blood and Roses"		5:47
17.	"A Girl Like You"		6:00
18.	"Batman Theme"	Neal Hefti	2:55

== Personnel ==
The Smithereens

- Pat DiNizio – vocals, guitar
- Jim Babjak – guitar, vocals
- Severo "The Thrilla" Jornacion – bass, vocals
- Dennis Diken – drums, vocals

Technical

- Kurt Reil – engineer, mixing
- Mike Olear – assistant
- John Koneval – assistant
- Kristin Pinell – assistant
- Joe Lambert – mastering
- Paul Grosso – creative direction
- Andrew Kelley – art direction, design
- Todd Sinclair - original cover concept
- Anne M. Bray – front cover photography
- Paulie Gee – back cover & inside booklet photography
- Chris Jordan – liner notes
