= This Is Pat DiNizio =

Studio album by Pat DiNizio
- Released: 23 May 2006
- Studio: Hollingsworth House, Scotch Plains, New Jersey
- Genre: Pop, rock, smooth jazz
- Length: 56:36
- Label: Fuel 2000
- Producer: Pat DiNizio

Pat DiNizio chronology
Songs and Sounds (1997)	This Is Pat DiNizio (2006)	Pat DiNizio (2007)

This Is Pat DiNizio is the second solo album by Pat DiNizio of The Smithereens, released in 2006 by Fuel 2000. The album features DiNizio accompanied by jazz pianist Jay Rowe interpreting songs from mainly the 1960s.

== Background ==
This Is Pat DiNizio is inspired and influenced by the 1975 vocal-piano album The Tony Bennett/Bill Evans Album, on which singer Tony Bennett and pianist Bill Evans interprets The Great American Songbook. "I really loved the record", Pat DiNizio explained. "I loved the challenge of it, because it’s just the naked solo human voice with one instrument. ... I wanted to do something similar, which was to do standards of my generation". With a few exceptions, most of the songs recorded for This Is Pat DiNizio are "songs that our generation grew up listening to firsthand when they were initially released", DiNizio wrote in the album's liner notes.

The album was recorded at Hollingsworth House, DiNizio's home in Scotch Plains, New Jersey, and all vocal and piano tracks are one-take, unedited performances with no overdubs.

== Critical reception ==
Professional ratings
Review scores
Source	Rating
AllMusic	3.5/5 stars

AllMusic's Mark Deming rated the album 3½ stars out of 5, saying that pianist Jay Rowe handles the melodies in a tasteful and elegant manner, and that DiNizio's phrasing is intelligent and well-considered. Deming felt that the "naturally moody tone" of DiNizio's vocals tends to favor the blue side of the song selection, which works well on certain songs but doesn't quite fit the material on others. He concluded that "DiNizio has both the pipes and the musical sense to make this sort of project work", and that the album was "a very pleasant surprise".

== Releases ==
The album was originally available through Pat DiNizio's website in a limited edition of 500 copies as a 3-disc set in 2005, but was quickly snapped up by Fuel 2000 for a single CD release in May 2006. In March 2012, Fuel 2000 released an expanded edition of the album with a slightly different track listing and a second disc of bonus tracks. A limited edition vinyl release followed in July 2012, released by The Great American Music Company.

== Track listing ==
No.	Title	Writer(s)	Original artist(s)	Length
1.	"For No One"	John Lennon, Paul McCartney	The Beatles	2:07
2.	"Wichita Lineman"	Jimmy Webb	Glen Campbell	3:14
3.	"Where Is Love?"	Lionel Bart	from the musical Oliver!	3:13
4.	"California Dreaming"	John Phillips, Michelle Phillips	The Mamas & The Papas	2:41
5.	"My Funny Valentine"	Lorenz Hart, Richard Rodgers	from the musical Babes in Arms	3:37
6.	"You Only Live Twice"	John Barry, Leslie Bricusse	Nancy Sinatra	2:51
7.	"Moon River"	Henry Mancini, Johnny Mercer	from the film Breakfast at Tiffany's	3:01
8.	"The Shadow of Your Smile"	Johnny Mandel, Paul Francis Webster	from the film The Sandpiper	2:53
9.	"Homeward Bound"	Paul Simon	Simon and Garfunkel	3:01
10.	"Days of Wine and Roses"	Mancini, Mercer	from the film Days of Wine and Roses	2:50
11.	"Our Town"	Sammy Cahn, Jimmy Van Heusen	Frank Sinatra	3:03
12.	"She Knows Me Too Well"	Mike Love, Brian Wilson	The Beach Boys	2:49
13.	"This Guy's in Love with You"	Burt Bacharach, Hal David	Herb Alpert	4:36
14.	"Everything That Touches You"	Terry Kirkman	The Association	3:08
15.	"The End of the World"	Sylvia Dee, Arthur Kent	Skeeter Davis	3:10
16.	"Surfer Girl"	Wilson	The Beach Boys	2:55
17.	"Blue Period"	Pat DiNizio	The Smithereens	3:17
18.	"Behind the Wall of Sleep"	DiNizio	The Smithereens	4:10
Total length:				56:36

== 2012 expanded edition ==
Released 20 March 2012, this 2-disc edition includes the original 18-track album with a different track listing and a second CD of bonus tracks. The songs "Blue Period" and "Behind the Wall of Sleep" from the original edition have been replaced with "How Can I Be Sure?" and "Anyone Who Had a Heart". "Blue Period", though, is included on the second CD.

=== Disc One ===
No.	Title	Writer(s)	Original artist(s)	Length
1.	"For No One"	John Lennon, Paul McCartney	The Beatles	2:07
2.	"Wichita Lineman"	Jimmy Webb	Glen Campbell	3:14
3.	"Where Is Love?"	Lionel Bart	from the musical Oliver!	3:13
4.	"California Dreaming"	John Phillips, Michelle Phillips	The Mamas & The Papas	2:41
5.	"My Funny Valentine"	Lorenz Hart, Richard Rodgers	from the musical Babes in Arms	3:37
6.	"You Only Live Twice"	John Barry, Leslie Bricusse	Nancy Sinatra	2:51
7.	"Moon River"	Henry Mancini, Johnny Mercer	from the film Breakfast at Tiffany's	3:01
8.	"How Can I Be Sure?"	Eddie Brigati, Felix Cavaliere	The Young Rascals	2:12
9.	"The Shadow of Your Smile"	Johnny Mandel, Paul Francis Webster	from the film The Sandpiper	2:53
10.	"Homeward Bound"	Paul Simon	Simon and Garfunkel	3:01
11.	"Days of Wine and Roses"	Mancini, Mercer	from the film Days of Wine and Roses	2:50
12.	"Anyone Who Had a Heart"	Burt Bacharach, Hal David	Dionne Warwick	3:12
13.	"Our Town"	Sammy Cahn, Jimmy Van Heusen	Frank Sinatra	3:03
14.	"She Knows Me Too Well"	Mike Love, Brian Wilson	The Beach Boys	2:49
15.	"This Guy's in Love with You"	Burt Bacharach, Hal David	Herb Alpert	4:36
16.	"Everything That Touches You"	Terry Kirkman	The Association	3:08
17.	"The End of the World"	Sylvia Dee, Arthur Kent	Skeeter Davis	3:10
18.	"Surfer Girl"	Wilson	The Beach Boys	2:55
Total length:				54:35

=== Disc Two ===
No.	Title	Writer(s)	Original artist(s)	Length
1.	"The Kids Are Alright"	Pete Townshend	The Who	3:09
2.	"You've Got to Hide Your Love Away"	John Lennon, Paul McCartney	The Beatles	2:37
3.	"Words of Love"	Buddy Holly	Buddy Holly	1:40
4.	"Well All Right"	Jerry Allison, Holly, Joe Mauldin, Norman Petty	Buddy Holly	3:07
5.	"Tired of Waiting"	Ray Davies	The Kinks	3:11
6.	"Don’t Fear the Reaper"	Donald "Buck Dharma" Roeser	Blue Öyster Cult	4:43
7.	"Paranoid"	Geezer Butler, Tony Iommi, Ozzy Osbourne, Bill Ward	Black Sabbath	3:16
8.	"I’m A Loser"	Lennon, McCartney	The Beatles	2:38
9.	"I'll Be on My Way"	Lennon, McCartney	Billy J. Kramer with the Dakotas	2:07
10.	"Afternoon Tea"	Pat DiNizio	The Smithereens	3:37
11.	"Evening Dress"	DiNizio	The Smithereens	2:58
12.	"Green Thoughts"	DiNizio	The Smithereens	2:32
13.	"I Believe"	Jim Babjak, Dennis Diken, DiNizio, Mike Mesaros, Danny Tate	The Smithereens	3:45
14.	"In a Lonely Place"	DiNizio	The Smithereens	4:56
15.	"Blue Period"	DiNizio	The Smithereens	3:18
16.	"Cigarette"	DiNizio	The Smithereens	3:03
17.	"Especially for You"	Babjak, DiNizio	The Smithereens	3:24
18.	"Room Without a View"	DiNizio	The Smithereens	3:33
Total length:				57:36

== 2012 vinyl edition ==
This Is Pat DiNizio was also issued as a limited edition LP in July 2012. The vinyl edition included the song "September Song", which was not included on either of the two previous CD releases.

Side A
No.	Title	Writer(s)	Original artist(s)	Length
1.	"For No One"	John Lennon, Paul McCartney	The Beatles
2.	"Wichita Lineman"	Jimmy Webb	Glen Campbell
3.	"Where Is Love?"	Lionel Bart	from the musical Oliver!
4.	"California Dreaming"	John Phillips, Michelle Phillips	The Mamas & The Papas
5.	"My Funny Valentine"	Lorenz Hart, Richard Rodgers	from the musical Babes in Arms
6.	"You Only Live Twice"	John Barry, Leslie Bricusse	Nancy Sinatra

Side B
No.	Title	Writer(s)	Original artist(s)	Length
7.	"Moon River"	Henry Mancini, Johnny Mercer	from the film Breakfast at Tiffany's
8.	"The Shadow of Your Smile"	Johnny Mandel, Paul Francis Webster	from the film The Sandpiper
9.	"Homeward Bound"	Paul Simon	Simon and Garfunkel
10.	"Days of Wine and Roses"	Mancini, Mercer	from the film Days of Wine and Roses
11.	"Our Town"	Sammy Cahn, Jimmy Van Heusen	Frank Sinatra
12.	"September Song"	Maxwell Anderson, Kurt Weill	from the musical Knickerbocker Holiday

== Personnel ==
Musicians

- Pat DiNizio – vocals, acoustic guitar (expanded edition disc two, tracks 1–9)
- Jay Rowe – piano (except expanded edition disc two, tracks 1–9, 13), electric piano (expanded edition disc two, track 13)

Technical

- Pat DiNizio – producer, engineer
- Rich Lamb – mixing
