= Seder Anything =

Episode of Gossip Girl (S2 E21)

"Seder Anything" is the twenty-first episode of the second season of the CW television series Gossip Girl. It premiered on CTV, Monday, 20 April 2009.

== Plot ==
Serena returns from her trip to Spain with Poppy and Gabriel. Blair makes a secret deal with Nate's grandfather. Dan takes a job to earn money for college.

== Cultural references ==
The episode title is derived from Say Anything... (1989), a romantic movie starring John Cusack and Ione Skye which was written and directed by Cameron Crowe.
