= Blue Period =

Blue Period may refer to:

- Picasso's Blue Period, the works of Pablo Picasso between 1901 and 1904
- Blue Period (album), a 1953 studio album by Miles Davis
- Blue Period (manga), a 2017 manga series by Tsubasa Yamaguchi
- "Blue Period" (song), a 1990 song by The Smithereens
