= Pat DiNizio/Buddy Holly =

Studio album by Pat DiNizio
- Released: January 27, 2009
- Studio: House of Vibes, Highland Park, New Jersey, Spectrum Studios, Pompano Beach, Florida, Rockhouse Studios, St. Joseph, Minnesota
- Genre: Rock
- Length: 30:54
- Label: Koch Records
- Producer: Kurt Reil

Pat DiNizio chronology
Pat DiNizio (2007)	Pat DiNizio/Buddy Holly (2009)	The Best of Pat DiNizio (2015)

Pat DiNizio/Buddy Holly is the fourth solo album by Pat DiNizio of The Smithereens, released in 2009 by Koch Records. The album features DiNizio interpreting eleven songs from the Buddy Holly songbook. The string arrangements, performed by the Encore Chamber String Quartet, were created by Charles Calello, famed for his work with The Four Seasons, Neil Diamond, Barbra Streisand, Bruce Springsteen and Laura Nyro. The album also features 1960s teen idol Bobby Vee on vocals and production by long-time Smithereens collaborator Kurt Reil of The Grip Weeds. The album's liner notes include an essay by noted Buddy Holly authority Bill Griggs along with reminiscences by Bobby Vee.

== Background ==
Inspired by The Beatles’ use of strings on "Eleanor Rigby" and "Yesterday", DiNizio chose to include string arrangements on most of the songs on the album. "We didn't take the material and do wacky things with it just to be different," DiNizio said. "I went to someone who was alive and making records when Buddy was still alive – Charles Calello – to arrange all of the strings." DiNizio said of the album: "I wanted to honor the memory of the musical artist from whom I got the most inspiration from – and in fact, provided the necessary encouragement to want to be a songwriter. I felt that on the fiftieth anniversary of his passing that someone should say something, but I didn’t want to do a typical knock-off Buddy Holly album, so I took a more baroque string-driven direction. On virtually every track there is a string quartet. So, it honors his memory, but I make the songs my own."

== Critical reception ==
Professional ratings
Review scores
Source	Rating
AllMusic	4/5 stars

AllMusic's Mark Deming rated the album 4 stars out of 5, saying that "DiNizio has opened up an unexpected side of the songs on Pat DiNizio/Buddy Holly that's strikingly effective", noting that "the concise, dramatic tone of the arrangements lends them a mature tone that dovetails remarkably well with Holly's lyrics and melodies". Deming added that much of the album "suggests how Holly might possibly have tackled these songs if he'd lived long enough to still perform them at age 55 or 60". Dave Tianen of the Milwaukee Journal Sentinel wrote that the use of strings on most of the songs make them sound "a little fuller, a little darker and at times a bit baroque". He felt that it "freshens" the music without violating Holly's original vision. He added that "Dinizio has done something here that probably sounds a little weird but works". In a more critical review Gene Triplett of The Oklahoman said that although DiNizio's voice was well-suited for the songs, and the acoustic and electric guitars "drive things swimmingly along for the most part", he felt that "such meant-to-be-snappy tunes as "Everyday" and "Peggy Sue" are inexplicably slowed to a maddeningly sluggish midtempo crawl, a gosh-awful doo-wop a cappella treatment of "That’ll Be the Day" cries out for guitar, and all of the songs are overladen with syrupy chamber strings, seriously marring DiNizio's well-intentioned salute to Holly".

== Track listing ==
No.	Title	Writer(s)	Length
1.	"Words of Love"	Buddy Holly	2:46
2.	"It Doesn't Matter Anymore"	Paul Anka	3:10
3.	"Heartbeat"	Bob Montgomery, Norman Petty	2:20
4.	"Well All Right"	Jerry Allison, Holly, Joe Mauldin, Petty	2:44
5.	"True Love Ways"	Holly, Petty	2:59
6.	"Listen to Me"	Charles Hardin, Petty	2:40
7.	"Raining in My Heart"	Boudleaux Bryant, Felice Bryant	3:53
8.	"Learning the Game"	Holly	2:05
9.	"Everyday"	Holly, Petty	2:41
10.	"Peggy Sue"	Allison, Holly, Petty	2:39
11.	"That'll Be the Day"	Allison, Holly, Petty	2:57
Total length:			30:54

== Personnel ==
Credits adapted from the album's liner notes.

Musicians

- Pat DiNizio – vocals, acoustic guitar
- Kurt Reil – drums, harmonica, vocals, guitar, 6-string bass
- Charles Calello – string arrangements
- John DiPuccio – 1st violin
- Laszlo Pap – 2nd violin
- Katrenna Johnson – viola
- Barbara Corcillo – cello
- Bobby Vee – harmony and lead vocals on "Listen to Me"
- Kristin Pinel – lead guitar on "Raining in My Heart"
- Tommy Frangione – guitar on "Raining in My Heart"
- Frank Iovino – a cappella vocals (bass) on "That'll Be the Day"
- Tony Alexander – a cappella vocals (baritone) on "That'll Be the Day"
- Spanky Pionegro – a cappella vocals (2nd tenor) on "That'll Be the Day"
- Dino Pionegro – a cappella vocals (1st tenor) on "That'll Be the Day"

Technical

- Kurt Reil – production, engineering, mixing, liner notes
- Zach Ziskin – engineering (Spectrum Studios)
- Arnold Mischkulnig – mastering
- Paul Grosso – creative direction, art direction, design
- Alice Butts – art direction, design
- Michael Halsband – photography
- Bill Griggs – liner notes
- Bobby Vee – liner notes

Notes

- Recorded at House of Vibes, Highland Park, New Jersey
- String Quartet and acapella vocals recorded at Spectrum Studios, Pompano Beach, Florida
- Bobby Vee vocals recorded at Rockhouse Studios, St. Joseph, Minnesota
- Mastered at Chop Shop Studios, Brooklyn, New York
