= Strangers When We Meet =

Strangers When We Meet may refer to:

- Strangers When We Meet, a 1958 novel by Evan Hunter
- Strangers When We Meet (film), a 1960 film adaptation
- "Strangers When We Meet" (David Bowie song)
- "Strangers When We Meet" (The Smithereens song)
