= Songs and Sounds =

Album by Pat DiNizio

Studio album by Pat DiNizio
- Released: 7 October 1997
- Studio: Reflection Sound Studios, Charlotte, North Carolina
- Genre: Rock
- Length: 44:03
- Label: Velvel
- Producer: Don Dixon

Pat DiNizio chronology
Songs and Sounds (1997)	This is Pat DiNizio (2006)

Songs and Sounds is the debut solo album by Pat DiNizio of the Smithereens, released in 1997 on Velvel Records.

Recorded during a hiatus from the Smithereens, the album features bassist J.J. Burnel, drummer Tony "Thunder" Smith and saxophonist Sonny Fortune billed as the Pat DiNizio Foursome. The album is produced by Smithereens veteran Don Dixon. The album is not a major departure from the jangly, Beatlesque power pop that the Smithereens were known for, though on a few songs DiNizio explores jazz, soundtrack and torch song influences. The album opens and closes with two songs from classic films: the melancholy "Where I Am Going (Jennie's Song)" from Portrait of Jennie (1948) and the jazz-tinged "I'd Rather Have the Blues" from Kiss Me Deadly (1955).

In 2005, Songs and Sounds, expanded with rare demos and live recordings, was included on the deluxe edition reissue of the Smithereens' God Save The Smithereens album.

== Background ==
Before Pat DiNizio began recording the album, the musicians had never met each other. DiNizio, though, knew them all individually - jazz saxophonist Sonny Fortune, Lou Reed drummer Tony "Thunder" Smith and Stranglers bassist J.J. Burnel. "In fact, Sonny had never heard a single note of anything I'd ever written. It's sort of my dream band," DiNizio said. "It's comprised of musicians I had admired and been influenced by at some level throughout the course of my career. The Stranglers were probably my favorite band of all time, next to the Beatles. Sonny Fortune was one of my favorite jazz artists, dating back to the '70s. And I had enjoyed Tony Smith's playing since I first saw him with Jan Hammer and Jeff Beck back in the mid-'70s". DiNizio wanted to do something a little different, "create a hybrid of musicians who perhaps had no real reason to be in the same room together", he explained. DiNizio didn't think that the album was a total departure from his past work, "but the approach is completely different than what the Smithereens might have recorded having been given that material", he said. "I pretty much gave [the musicians] the freedom to do whatever they wanted to do on the record."

The album contains songs about the end of DiNizio's marriage; "Liza" is about the separation from his daughter; and "Somewhere Down the Line" is about the (temporary) demise of the Smithereens. There are certain declarations of independence, like "Running, Jumping, Standing Still".

DiNizio toured the album with Burnel and Smith as the Pat DiNizio Trio between January and February 1998. Fortune only joined them for the band's New York City date, due to other commitments.

== Critical reception ==
Professional ratings
Review scores
Source	Rating
AllMusic	4/5 stars
Boston Phoenix	3/4 stars
Chicago Tribune	3/4 stars
The Encyclopedia of Popular Music	3/5 stars

Mark Caro of the Chicago Tribune rated the album three stars out of four, saying that although DiNizio begins his first solo album by "crooning Bernard Herrmann's "Where I Am Going" over jazz veteran Sonny Fortune's smoky alto-sax leads, he's soon back to delivering compact, crunchy guitar-pop songs not unlike those he writes and sings for the Smithereens", adding that DiNizio maintains his "devotion to the hook". Keith Phipps of The A.V. Club said "there are enough modifications and departures on Songs And Sounds to avoid a Smithereens retread, and enough familiar strengths to make it the solidly entertaining album that should be expected of DiNizio". AllMusic's Stephen Thomas Erlewine wrote: "DiNizio retains his gift for catchy, effortless melodies, and that ties together the diverse strands of the record". He added that the album "is the kind of record he couldn't have made with the Smithereens, and that's what makes it such a welcome effort". Sam MacDonald of The Daily Press said that while the album contains a few jazzy experiments, "Songs and Sounds isn't an enormous departure from The Smithereens' work. It's an uneven effort. But the disc includes some jewels - the Buddy Holly-like "A World Apart," the lovely, aching "No Love Lost," the quiet, brooding "I'd Rather Have The Blues." Michael McCall of the Weekly Wire wrote that the album "allows Dinizio to display a newfound artistic breadth. From the soul-baring melancholy of the album's moody opener, "Where I Am Going," to the jazz-tinged, cabaret pop of the closing "I'd Rather Have the Blues (Than What I've Got)," Dinizio proves he's capable of creating distinctly personal songs in a wide variety of musical settings".

== Track listing ==
All tracks are written by Pat DiNizio.

No.	Title	Writer(s)	Length
1.	"Where I Am Going (Jennie's Song)"	Bernard Hermann	1:47
2.	"Nobody but Me"	DiNizio, David Spring	2:42
3.	"124 MPH"		4:11
4.	"Running, Jumping, Standing Still"		4:05
5.	"Everyday World"		2:49
6.	"No Love Lost"		5:07
7.	"A World Apart"		3:35
8.	"Today It's You"		2:02
9.	"Liza"		3:17
10.	"Somewhere Down the Line"		2:51
11.	"You Should Know"	DiNizio, Danny Tate	3:42
12.	"I'd Rather Have the Blues"	Frank De Vol	7:53

== Personnel ==
The Pat DiNizio Foursome

- Pat DiNizio – vocals, guitar
- J.J. Burnel – bass, vocals
- Sonny Fortune – saxophone, flute
- Tony "Thunder" Smith – drums, vocals, percussion

Additional musicians

- Marti Jones – vocals on "Liza"
- Don Dixon – piano solo on "Somewhere Down the Line", recorder on "Liza"
- Valerie Vardel – vocals on "Running, Jumping, Standing Still"
- John Thorton – trumpet, french horn on "Everyday World"
- Chuck Farmer – trombone on "Everyday World"

Technical

- Don Dixon – producer, liner notes
- Mark Williams – engineer
- Tracey Schroeder – assistant engineer
- Billy Siegle – producer, engineer on pre-production demos (Mayberry Studios, Tempe, Arizona)
- Kevin Weremychik – guitars, tea, sympathy, production coordination
- Greg Calbi – mastering
- Michael Daks – photography
- Leah Sherman/Reiner NYC – art direction
