= Pat DiNizio (album) =

Studio album by Pat DiNizio
- Released: 25 September 2007
- Studio: House of Vibes, Highland Park, NJ
- Genre: Rock
- Length: 29:31
- Label: East West Records
- Producer: Kurt Reil

Pat DiNizio chronology
This is Pat DiNizio (2006)	Pat DiNizio (2007)	Pat DiNizio/Buddy Holly (2009)

Pat DiNizio is the third solo album by Pat DiNizio of The Smithereens, released in 2007 by East West Records. Following two solo albums that showed DiNizio moving away from the sound and style of The Smithereens to explore new musical directions, Pat DiNizio sees him return to 1960s-style pop with a big guitar sound. The album features Smithereens members Jim Babjak and Severo "The Thrilla" Jornacion on guitar and bass respectively, as well as Kurt Reil of The Grip Weeds on drums, who also handles production duties.

Six of the album's ten songs first appeared on Revolutions, a 3-disc set (2 CD/1 DVD) available through Pat DiNizio's website in a limited edition of 300 copies in 2006. "Since You Went Away", "Night Without Sleep", "I Need You" and "You Said" are exclusive to Pat DiNizio.

== Critical reception ==
Professional ratings
Review scores
Source	Rating
AllMusic	3/5 stars

AllMusic's Mark Deming rated the album 3 stars out of 5, noting that although DiNizio "offer a few change-ups from the prototypical Smithereens approach with some spare, acoustic based numbers (such as "Night Without Sleep" and "Love") ... [other songs] are his old band in all but name". And while the gloomy "Since You Went Away" and "Sometimes" attempt to take DiNizio's songwriting into a new direction, Deming felt that "the results just don't stretch as far from established territory as they need to have an identity of their own". Deming concluded that the album "sounds less like a solo effort than a slightly misbegotten Smithereens disc, and DiNizio's back catalog demonstrates he can do better than this".

== Track listing ==
All tracks are written by Pat DiNizio

No.	Title	Length
1.	"Since You Went Away"	2:56
2.	"Night Without Sleep"	2:57
3.	"Wonderful"	2:51
4.	"Any Other Way"	3:12
5.	"I Need You"	2:16
6.	"Dear World"	3:04
7.	"Love"	2:50
8.	"Sometimes"	2:35
9.	"You Said"	3:50
10.	"Don't Look Now"	3:00
Total length:		29:31

=== Revolutions track listing ===
Released in 2006, this 3-disc limited edition includes the same track listing on disc one and two, disc two being acoustic versions of the same songs, and in the same order, as on disc one. Disc three contains the DVD Night Without Sleep - The Making of an Album.

No.	Title	Length
1.	"World Ends"
2.	"So Wonderful"
3.	"Any Other Way"
4.	"Sometimes"
5.	"Someday Boy"
6.	"Love Runs Wild"
7.	"King Of The World"
8.	"On The Beach"
9.	"Dear World"
10.	"Don't Look Now"

== Personnel ==
Credits adapted from the album's liner notes.

Musicians

- Pat DiNizio – vocals, guitar
- Jim Babjak – guitar
- Severo "The Thrilla" Jornacion – bass
- Kurt Reil – drums, guitar, Mellotron, vocals
- Vince Grogan – bass on "Wonderful" and "Dear World"

Technical

- Kurt Reil – production, engineering, mixing
- Danny Clinch – cover photo
- Todd Sinclair – design, art direction
