= Say Anything... =

1989 film by Cameron Crowe

- Theatrical release poster
- Directed by: Cameron Crowe
- Written by: Cameron Crowe
- Produced by: Polly Platt
- Starring: John Cusack; Ione Skye; John Mahoney
- Cinematography: László Kovács
- Edited by: Richard Marks
- Music by: Richard Gibbs; Anne Dudley
- Production company: Gracie Films
- Distributed by: 20th Century Fox
- Release date: April 14, 1989
- Running time: 100 minutes
- Country: United States
- Language: English
- Budget: $16 million
- Box office: $21.5 million

Say Anything... is a 1989 American teen romantic comedy-drama film written and directed by Cameron Crowe in his feature directorial debut. The film follows the romance between Lloyd Dobler (John Cusack), an average student, and Diane Court (Ione Skye), the class valedictorian, immediately after their graduation from high school.

Say Anything... was released theatrically in the United States on April 14, 1989, by 20th Century Fox. The film received critical acclaim. In 2002, Entertainment Weekly named Say Anything... the best modern romance film, and in 2012, ranked it number 11 on its list of the "50 Best High School Movies".

== Plot ==
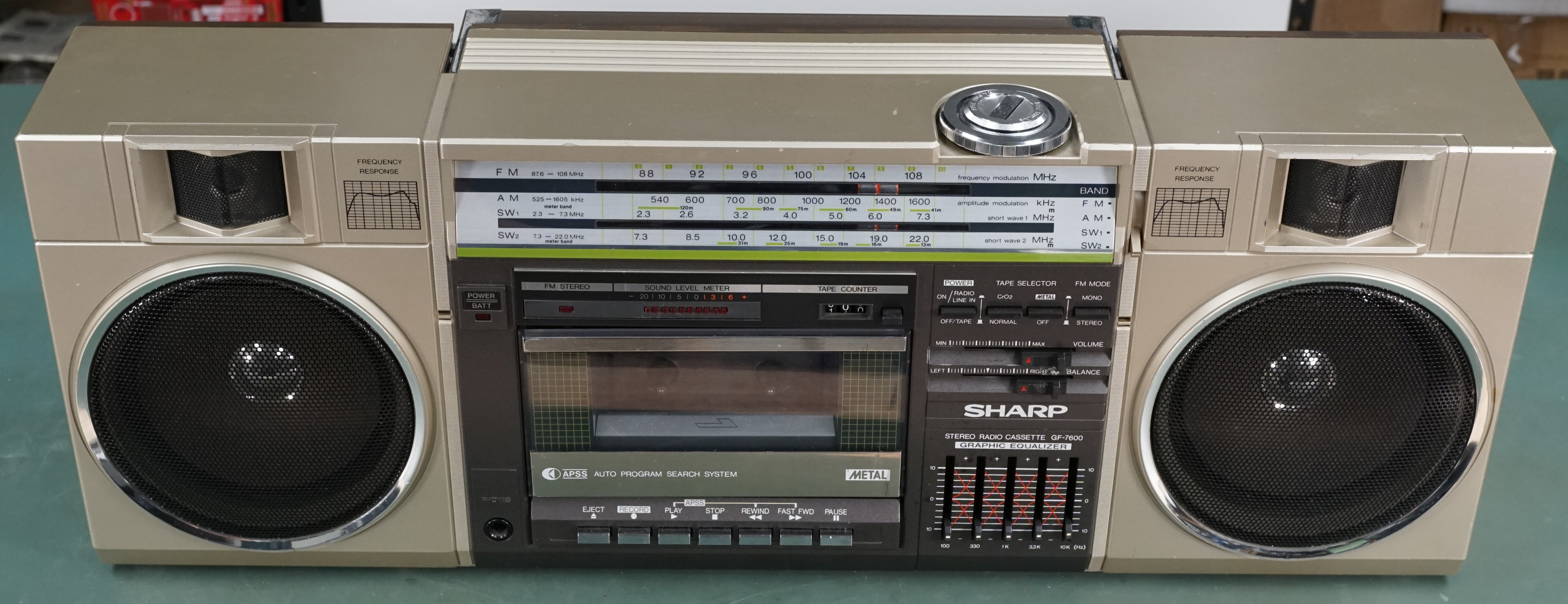
The Sharp GF-7600 boombox that Cusack held above his head

At the end of their high school senior year, noble underachiever Lloyd Dobler is smitten with valedictorian Diane Court. He plans to ask her out, although they belong to different social groups.

Lloyd's parents are stationed in Germany in the U.S. Army, so he lives with his sister Constance, a single mother, and still has no plans for his future. Diane comes from a sheltered academic upbringing, living with her doting divorced father Jim, who owns the retirement home where she works. She will take up a prestigious fellowship in England at the end of the summer.

Lloyd offers to take Diane to their graduation party. She agrees, to everyone's surprise. Their next "date" is a dinner at Diane's, where Lloyd fails to impress Jim, and IRS agents arrive unexpectedly to inform the latter he is under scrutiny for tax fraud.

Diane introduces Lloyd to the retirement home residents and he teaches her to drive her manual transmission Ford Tempo graduation gift. They grow closer and lose their virginity together in the car, to her father's concern. Lloyd's musician best friend Corey, who has never overcome her unfaithful ex-boyfriend Joe, warns him to take care of Diane.

Jim urges Diane to break up with Lloyd, feeling he is not an appropriate match, and suggests she give him a pen as a parting gift. Worried about her father, Diane tells Lloyd she wants to stop seeing him and concentrate on her studies, giving him the pen. Devastated, he seeks advice from Corey, who tells him to "be a man" because it takes more to be a "man" rather than just being a "guy". Meanwhile, Jim discovers his credit cards are declined as the investigation continues.

At dawn, Lloyd stands under Diane's open bedroom window and plays "In Your Eyes" by Peter Gabriel on a boombox, which played when they had sex. The next day, she meets with an IRS investigator, who says they have evidence incriminating Jim with embezzling funds from his retirement home residents. He suggests she accept the fellowship as matters with her father will only worsen.

Diane finds the cash concealed at home and confronts Jim, who tells her he took it to give her financial independence. He feels justified in doing so, insisting he provided better care of his residents than their families. Distraught, Diane reconciles with Lloyd at his kickboxing gym.

At the end of the summer, Jim is incarcerated on a nine-month sentence after accepting a plea deal. Lloyd visits him at the prison, saying he is accompanying Diane to England. Jim reacts angrily when Lloyd gives him a letter from Diane, but she arrives to say goodbye and they embrace. She gives Jim the pen he had suggested she give to Lloyd, asking him to write to her in England. Lloyd supports and comforts Diane, who is afraid of flying, on their flight.

== Cast ==
- John Cusack as Lloyd Dobler
- Ione Skye as Diane Court
- John Mahoney as Jim Court
- Lili Taylor as Corey Flood
- Amy Brooks as D.C.
- Pamela Segall as Rebecca
- Jason Gould as Mike Cameron
- Loren Dean as Joe
- Glenn Walker Harris Jr. as Jason Dobler
- Polly Platt as Mrs. Flood
- Jeremy Piven as Mark
- Bebe Neuwirth as Mrs. Evans
- Eric Stoltz as Vahlere
- Kim Walker as Sheila
- Chynna Phillips as Mimi
- Joanna Frank as Mrs. Kerwin
- Richard Portnow as IRS Agent Stewart
- Philip Baker Hall as IRS boss
- Don "The Dragon" Wilson as sparring partner
- Joan Cusack as Constance Dobler (uncredited)
- Dan Castellaneta as Diane's teacher (uncredited)
- Lois Chiles as Diane's mother (uncredited)

== Production ==
Jennifer Connelly and Ione Skye vied for the role of Diane Court, but Skye was cast in the end. Robert Downey Jr. was offered the role of Lloyd Dobler, but turned it down. Christian Slater and Kirk Cameron were also considered for the role. Dick Van Dyke and Richard Dreyfuss were considered for the role of Jim Court.

Cusack initially refused to film the boombox scene as he felt that Dobler wouldn't do something so theatrical and performative. Instead, he wanted to do it while sitting in the car, with the boombox playing on top of the hood. To get the shot he wanted, director Cameron Crowe tricked him. Crowe had the camera rolling but without film in it for a prior take, allowing Cusack to perform the scene one last time while venting his real-life frustration, which created the perfect on-screen emotion.

== Soundtrack ==
The Smithereens originally wrote "A Girl Like You" for the film, but the film's producers ultimately cut the song believing it revealed too much of the plot, and used "In Your Eyes" by Peter Gabriel in its place; "A Girl Like You" was released later that year on their album 11 and became a top 40 entry in the US. AllMusic wrote that the soundtrack, like the film, is "much smarter than the standard teen fare of the era." The soundtrack consists of these songs:

No.	Title	Artist	Length
1.	"All for Love"	Nancy Wilson	4:37
2.	"Cult of Personality"	Living Colour	5:07
3.	"One Big Rush"	Joe Satriani	3:25
4.	"You Want It"	Cheap Trick	3:43
5.	"Taste the Pain"	Red Hot Chili Peppers	5:04
6.	"In Your Eyes"	Peter Gabriel	5:23
7.	"Stripped"	Depeche Mode	6:41
8.	"Skankin' to the Beat"	Fishbone	2:49
9.	"Within Your Reach"	The Replacements	4:26
10.	"Keeping the Dream Alive"	Freiheit	4:14
11.	"Lloyd Dobler Rap"	John Cusack	0:33
Total length:			45:29

== Critical reception ==
Say Anything... was well reviewed. On the review aggregator website Rotten Tomatoes, the film holds an approval rating of 98% based on 50 reviews, with an average rating of 8.2/10. The website's critics consensus reads, "One of the definitive Generation X movies, Say Anything is equally funny and heartfelt—and it established John Cusack as an icon for left-of-center types everywhere." On Metacritic, which assigns a weighted average score out of 100 to reviews from mainstream critics, the film received an average score of 86 based on 19 critics, indicating "universal acclaim". Audiences surveyed by CinemaScore gave the film a grade B+ on scale of A to F.

Giving the film four stars out of four, Chicago Sun-Times film critic Roger Ebert called Say Anything... "one of the best films of the year—a film that is really about something, that cares deeply about the issues it contains—and yet it also works wonderfully as a funny, warmhearted romantic comedy." He later included it in his 2002 Great Movie list, writing, "Say Anything exists entirely in a real world, is not a fantasy or a pious parable, has characters who we sort of recognize, and is directed with care for the human feelings involved."

Pauline Kael in The New Yorker was similarly enthusiastic, writing, "It's a slight movie, but that's not a put-down. Its slightness has to do with the writer-director Cameron Crowe's specialty: he's wired into teen-age flakes and the sloppy, exuberant confusion of high-school dating. Crowe is great here on oddity and fringe moments; the comedy helps to dry out the romanticism -- to give it lightness and a trace of enchantment."

In a less positive review, Variety called it a "half-baked love story, full of good intentions but uneven in the telling." But, the review also said the film's "[a]ppealing tale of an undirected army brat proving himself worthy of the most exceptional girl in high school elicits a few laughs, plenty of smiles and some genuine feeling." In a mixed review, Caryn James of The New York Times wrote:

[The film] resembles a first-rate production of a children's story. Its sense of parents and the summer after high school is myopic, presented totally from the teenagers' point of view. Yet its melodrama—Will Dad go to prison? Will Diane go to England?—distorts that perspective, so the film doesn't have much to offer an actual adult, not even a sense of what it's truly like to be just out of high school these days. The film is all charming performances and grace notes, but there are plenty of worse things to be.

== Cultural influence ==
The film features one of the most enduring scenes in romance films, in which John Cusack holds a boombox above his head outside Diane's bedroom window to let her know that he has not given up on her. Crowe and producer James L. Brooks believed the scene could become a hallmark of the movie, though Crowe found it difficult to film because Cusack felt it was "too passive". The scene was first scored with Fishbone's "Question of Life", but after viewing the scene, Crowe opted to replace it with Peter Gabriel's "In Your Eyes" to better fit the mood that he wished to convey. Gabriel initially turned down Crowe because he confused the film with another film in production at the time, a John Belushi biography titled Wired. "That scene is like Romeo under the trellis," said Crowe reminiscing about the scene. "But I have this feeling when I watch it that it's filled with double emotion – both with the story and the actors, whose own trepidation bleeds in."

In a September 2012 interview with Rolling Stone, discussing the 25th anniversary of So (from which "In Your Eyes" hails), Gabriel commented on the cultural impact of the scene, "It definitely gave [the song] a second life, because now it's so often parodied in comedy shows and it is one of the modern day Romeo and Juliet balcony clichés. I've talked to John Cusack about that. We're sort of trapped together in a minuscule moment of contemporary culture." In October 2012, as Gabriel played the first few bars of the song during a performance at the Hollywood Bowl, Cusack walked onto the stage, handed him a boombox and took a bow, before quickly walking off again. Cameron Crowe was also present at the concert and later tweeted "Peter Gabriel and John Cusack on stage together at the Hollywood Bowl tonight. Won't forget that... ever." At a concert in Madison Square Garden on September 18, 2023 (touring his album I/O), Gabriel held up an inflatable toy boombox during a performance of "In Your Eyes," reported as "a nod to Lloyd Dobler."

== Canceled TV series ==
A television series based on the film was planned by NBC and 20th Century Fox, but producers Aaron Kaplan and Justin Adler did not know that Crowe had not approved of the project. When they found out his views, the show was dropped.
