= Tell Me When Did Things Go So Wrong =

Song by The Smithereens

from the album Blow Up
- Released: September 10, 1991
- Genre: Power pop, alternative rock
- Length: 2:22
- Label: Capitol
- Songwriter(s): Pat DiNizio
- Producer(s): Ed Stasium

"Tell Me When Did Things Go So Wrong" is a song by the American alternative rock group The Smithereens, appearing on their fourth album Blow Up. Despite not being released as a single, the song charted in the United States.

== Charts ==
Chart (1991)	Peak position
U.S. Billboard Mainstream Rock Tracks	28
U.S. Billboard Modern Rock Tracks	11
