= Top of the Pops (song) =

Single by The Smithereens

from the album Blow Up
- B-side: "Poor Little Pitiful One"
- Released: August 19, 1991
- Genre: Power pop, alternative rock
- Length: 4:32
- Label: Capitol
- Songwriter: Pat DiNizio
- Producer: Ed Stasium

The Smithereens singles chronology
| "Blue Period" (1990) | "Top of the Pops" (1991) | "Too Much Passion" (1991) |

"Top of the Pops" is a song by the American alternative rock group The Smithereens. It is the first single released in support of their fourth album Blow Up.

== Formats and track listing ==
All songs written by Pat DiNizio, except where noted.

European 7" single (204 558 7)

1. "Top of the Pops" – 4:32
2. "Poor Little Pitiful One" – 3:33

European CD single (CDP 650)

1. "Top of the Pops" – 4:32
2. "Poor Little Pitiful One" – 3:33
3. "One After 909" (Lennon–McCartney) – 3:36
4. "Shakin' All Over" (Johnny Kidd, Gus Robinson) – 4:06
5. "A Girl Like You (MTV Unplugged)" – 4:44

US cassette single (4 km-44762)

1. "Top of the Pops" – 4:32
2. "Poor Little Pitiful One" – 3:33
3. "Anywhere You Are (instrumental version)" – 3:44

== Charts ==
Chart performance for "Top of the Pops"
| Chart (1991–1992) | Peak position |
|---|---|
| Australia (ARIA) | 77 |
| Canada Top Singles (RPM) | 58 |
| Netherlands (Single Top 100) | 64 |
| US Mainstream Rock (Billboard) | 19 |
| US Alternative Airplay (Billboard) | 2 |
