= In a Lonely Place (song) =

Single by The Smithereens

from the album Especially for You
- B-side: "Blood and Roses" (live)
- Released: November 1986
- Recorded: The Record Plant, New York City
- Genre: Power pop, alternative rock
- Length: 4:04
- Label: Enigma
- Songwriter(s): Pat DiNizio
- Producer(s): Don Dixon

The Smithereens singles chronology
"Behind the Wall of Sleep" (1986)	"In a Lonely Place" (1986)	"Strangers When We Meet" (1987)

"In a Lonely Place" is a song by the American alternative rock group the Smithereens, released in 1986. It is the third single released in support of their debut album Especially for You. It features Suzanne Vega on background vocals, as well as guest musicians Frank Christian on acoustic guitar and Jeffrey Berman on vibraphone.

== Background ==
The song takes its title from the 1950 film noir In a Lonely Place, starring Humphrey Bogart and Gloria Grahame, and its pre-chorus lyrics are largely adapted from key lines of dialogue in the film; at one point, Bogart's character says, "I was born when she kissed me. I died when she left me. I lived a few weeks while she loved me," while in the film's climactic scene, Grahame's character says, "Yesterday, this would've meant so much to us. Now it doesn't matter... it doesn't matter at all." The relevant lyrics are:

"I was born the day I met you/Lived a while when you loved me/Died a little when we broke apart//Yesterday, it would have mattered/Now today, it doesn't mean a thing/All my hopes and dreams are shattered now."

Songwriter Pat DiNizio originally wanted to record the song with Brazilian samba and bossa nova singer Astrud Gilberto, known for her performance of the song "The Girl from Ipanema". He went to see a concert she gave in New York City and approached her about singing on the song. "I went to see her specifically, not only because I loved her singing, the records she’d made, but I knew she was perfect for this", DiNizio told PopEntertainment.com. "She said, ‘Call my manager.’ She could have been sincere about wanting to do it – of course for a price, probably. For a fee. I just got the feeling I was barking up the wrong tree". Instead, DiNizio decided to record the song with Suzanne Vega, whom he knew from when they worked together at an office.

== Formats and track listing ==
All songs written by Pat DiNizio, except where noted.

US 7" single (B-75003)

1. "In a Lonely Place" – 4:04
2. "Blood and Roses (live)" – 5:45

US 12" single (V-75501)

1. "In a Lonely Place" – 4:04
2. "Behind the Wall of Sleep (live)" – 3:26
3. "Beauty and Sadness (live)" – 4:10

UK 7" single (Enig 1)

1. "In a Lonely Place" – 4:04
2. "Beauty and Sadness" – 3:47

UK 12" single (Enig 1T)

1. "In a Lonely Place" – 4:04
2. "In a Lonely Place (live)"
3. "Blood and Roses (live)" – 5:12
4. "Beauty and Sadness" – 4:10
5. "Mr. Eliminator" (Dick Dale) – 2:00

== Charts ==
Chart (1987)	Peak position
UK Indie Chart	5

== Personnel ==
The Smithereens

- Pat DiNizio – vocals
- Jim Babjak – guitar
- Mike Mesaros – bass guitar
- Dennis Diken – drums, percussion

Additional musicians

- Suzanne Vega – vocals
- Frank Christian – acoustic guitar
- Jeffrey Berman – vibraphone
