= Blues Before and After =

Single by The Smithereens

from the album 11
- B-side: "Maria Elena (acoustic version)"
- Released: January 22, 1990
- Recorded: American Recording, Rumbo Recorders, The Grey Room, Los Angeles, CA
- Genre: Power pop, alternative rock
- Length: 3:15
- Label: Capitol/Enigma
- Songwriter: Pat DiNizio
- Producer: Ed Stasium

The Smithereens singles chronology
"A Girl Like You" (1989)	"Blues Before and After" (1990)	"Yesterday Girl" (1990)

"Blues Before and After" is a song by the American alternative rock group The Smithereens. It is the second single released in support of their third album 11.

== Formats and track listing ==
All songs written by Pat DiNizio

US cassette single (4JM-44516)

1. "Blues Before and After" – 3:15
2. "Maria Elena (acoustic version)" – 2:47

== Charts ==
Chart (1990)	Peak position
US Billboard Hot 100	94
US Mainstream Rock (Billboard)	7
US Alternative Airplay (Billboard)	18

== Uses in Media ==
From 2009-2025, this song could be found on the secret list of Hollywood Rip Ride Rockit. The code was 102, and the song played from the beginning.
