= Especially for You (The Smithereens album) =

Studio album by The Smithereens
- Released: July 1986
- Recorded: April 1985; December 1985
- Studios: The Record Plant, New York City
- Genres: Power pop; post-punk; alternative rock
- Length: 38:07
- Label: Enigma
- Producer: Don Dixon

The Smithereens chronology
Beauty and Sadness (1983)	Especially for You (1986)	Green Thoughts (1988)

Singles from Especially for You
- 1. "Blood and Roses" Released: 1986; 2. "Behind the Wall of Sleep" Released: 1986; 3. "In a Lonely Place" Released: 1986; 4. "Strangers When We Meet" Released: 1987

Professional ratings
Review scores
Source	Rating
AllMusic	4.5/5 stars
Robert Christgau	B−
Rolling Stone	4/5 stars

Especially for You is the first full-length album by the US rock band The Smithereens, released in July 1986 by Enigma Records.

The album is notable for the hit "Blood and Roses", which has been featured in multiple movie and TV productions. Producer Don Dixon's co-production work on R.E.M.'s Murmur and Reckoning albums added attention to the record's initial release. Two of its songs became hits on Billboard's Album Rock Tracks chart: "Blood and Roses" reached No. 14, while "Behind the Wall of Sleep" peaked at No. 23. The album reached No. 51 on the US Billboard 200 as well as No. 5 on the UK Indie Chart. It was certified platinum in the US for sales over 1,000,000 copies. The album today is highly regarded by most critics, and was one of Kurt Cobain's favorite albums, as noted in his journal.

== Background ==
On April 5, 1985, the Smithereens booked themselves into the Record Plant in New York City and recorded five songs: "Blood and Roses", "Behind the Wall of Sleep", "Cigarette", "Crazy Mixed-Up Kid" and "Alone at Midnight". "All in one evening", according to drummer Dennis Diken. The plan was to shop the finished tapes to all the major and minor labels in the hope of securing a deal. Guitarist Jim Babjak: "After we completed the recordings, we submitted these songs to practically every label out there and were rejected by all except for a small label in California called Enigma." Don Dixon, who had co-produced the first two R.E.M. albums, was selected to produce the album. "We touched up the songs that were in the can and recorded another batch to fill out the album at the Record Plant", Babjak said. Recording and mixing took about 10 days in December 1985, with everything wrapping up on New Year's Eve. Enigma released Especially for You in July 1986. Lead vocalist Pat DiNizio: "This was like a greatest hits album from a band nobody’s heard of because we’d had those songs for five years."

== Songs ==
- "Strangers When We Meet" – to songwriter Pat DiNizio, the song was his attempt to rewrite the Beach Boys' "Don't Worry Baby", "but in the end it turned into something else altogether", he said. The title was taken from the 1960 film of the same name and the lyrics were directly inspired by the plot. Written in 1984 and considered by the band as the main "pop hit single" candidate on the album.
- "Groovy Tuesday" – A recently written song, co-written by DiNizio, Steve Forbert and Mark Johnson. Forbert: "Pat DiNizio and I and Mark Johnson, we were drinking and hanging out and wanted to write something just really off the wall, kind of goofy. We were talking about psychedelic groups like The Flower Pot Men and The Chocolate Watchband and we just wanted to make up a song." Inspired by a listen to The Who Sell Out, the three songwriters picked up guitars and wrote the song. At one point "Groovy Tuesday" was set to be the title of the album.
- "Cigarette" – Written in May 1984 on a train from Stockholm to Amsterdam the day after the Smithereens' first Scandinavian tour ended. DiNizio: "I was feeling lonely and disoriented and homesick, looking out the train window ... This was right around the time that cigarette smoking became extremely unpopular in the United States. But everyone we met in Europe seemed to be happily smoking their brains out! I remembered seeing films that celebrated the romance of the cigarette by showing a couple in bed sharing a smoke after sleeping together, or the actor Charles Boyer putting two cigarettes in his mouth and lighting them both at the same time and then handing one to his lover. That's what the song is about, really."
- "I Don't Want to Lose You" – DiNizio: "Some of the first songs I wrote, while charming, are not great compositions. It’s someone learning how to write songs. Yet some of the songs—in fact my first composition, "I Don’t Want to Lose You" wound up on Especially for You and a lot of folks like that song."
- "Time and Time Again" – One of the first songs DiNizio wrote, "definitely under the influence of early Lennon-McCartney", he said. "The main riff obviously owes a lot to "Oh, Pretty Woman" by the great Roy Orbison, although it took me years to recognize it!" The band's first recording of the song was a 1980 demo.
- "Behind the Wall of Sleep" – Lyrics written by DiNizio on the back of a cocktail napkin on a flight home from Boston to New York City. The Smithereens had shared a bill with the Boston band The Bristols, whose bassist Kim Ernst had caught DiNizio's attention. DiNizio: "My crush on her led me to write that on a very hung-over morning after a party in Boston." The lyrics include references to 1960s model Jean Shrimpton ("She had hair like Jeannie Shrimpton back in 1965") and Rolling Stone Bill Wyman ("She held a bass guitar and she was playing in a band/And she stood just like Bill Wyman/Now I am her biggest fan"). At the time, DiNizio didn't give a lot of thought to the pop imagery in the lyrics, but it "seemed to create a certain interest later on", he said in 1995. The melody came to DiNizio at the same time: "I’m singing the thing to myself for the whole flight, like a mantra, so I don’t forget it. Then I get stuck in traffic for two hours and I’m nearly losing my mind, because I knew I had a good song."
- "In a Lonely Place" – Musically, the song is an homage to the work of Brazilian songwriter Antônio Carlos Jobim, composer of "The Girl from Ipanema". DiNizio tried unsuccessfully to get samba and bossa nova singer Astrud Gilberto to sing on it, but ended up recording the song with Suzanne Vega, whom he knew from when they worked together at an office. It was the only song on the album that hadn't yet been played live. DiNizio had brought this new song into the studio as the band were completing the basic track sessions for the album. It was recorded with no rehearsal at the 11th hour. The song takes its title from the 1950 film noir of the same name, starring Humphrey Bogart and Gloria Grahame, and its pre-chorus lyrics are largely adapted from key lines of dialogue in the film; at one point, Bogart's character says, "I was born when she kissed me. I died when she left me. I lived a few weeks while she loved me," while in the film's climactic scene, Grahame's character says, "Yesterday, this would've meant so much to us. Now it doesn't matter... it doesn't matter at all." The relevant lyrics are: "I was born the day I met you/Lived a while when you loved me/Died a little when we broke apart//Yesterday, it would have mattered/Now today, it doesn't mean a thing/All my hopes and dreams are shattered now."
- "Blood and Roses" – DiNizio: "I was walking home from my job as soundman at NYC's legendary Folk City nightclub through the freezing rain at about four in the morning when the bass line came to me, the chords and melody came later built around the bass part." Lyrically, the song is about a girl DiNizio knew in highschool, who took her own life. The title was taken from a short story of the same name by the Japanese writer Yukio Mishima, a literary hero of DiNizio's. "I found out years later that Blood and Roses was also the title of an obscure early 1960s horror film directed by Roger Vadim", DiNizio said.
- "Hand of Glory" – Written by Jimmy Silva, a friend of the band, who recorded his own version of the song on his album Remnants of the Empty Set in 1986 featuring Dennis Diken on drums. DiNizio explained that it was "the type of song that had a lot of energy live and it always went over great, and we thought we'd give it a shot in the studio, and it wound up on the album."
- "Alone at Midnight" – DiNizio: "I couldn’t get a handle on it. It literally took three years to write the song".
- "White Castle Blues" – Written by Jim Babjak and high school friend Bob Banta in 1977 as an ode to late night cravings for White Castle hamburgers. With some leftover studio time, the band decided to record "the hamburger song", as it was referred to by producer Don Dixon. It was recorded live in the studio in one take, featuring Babjak on lead vocals and Marshall Crenshaw on six-string bass. The band's label, Enigma, decided to include the song as a bonus track on the CD version of the album. Babjak: "It doesn't really belong on the record but it ended up on the record. As a result my friend Bob Banta, who wrote the lyrics and myself who wrote the music ended up in the White Castle Hall of Fame because of the song." The song became a concert favorite for the band, often appearing as an encore.
- "Mr. Eliminator" – Written by Dick Dale. Adapted for the band's live shows and recorded in one take.

== Track listing ==
All tracks are written by Pat DiNizio except where noted.

No.	Title	Writer(s)	Length
1.	"Strangers When We Meet"		3:46
2.	"Listen to Me Girl"		3:00
3.	"Groovy Tuesday"	Pat DiNizio, Steve Forbert, Mark Johnson	2:39
4.	"Cigarette"		2:31
5.	"I Don't Want to Lose You"		3:21
6.	"Time and Time Again"		3:09
7.	"Behind the Wall of Sleep"		3:23
8.	"In a Lonely Place"		4:10
9.	"Blood and Roses"		3:35
10.	"Crazy Mixed-Up Kid"		2:06
11.	"Hand of Glory"	Jimmy Silva	2:45
12.	"Alone at Midnight"		3:42
Total length:			38:07

CD bonus track
No.	Title	Writer(s)	Length
13.	"White Castle Blues"	Jim Babjak, Robert Banta	3:59
Total length:			42:06

1992 CD re-issue bonus tracks
No.	Title	Writer(s)	Length
13.	"White Castle Blues"	Babjak, Banta	3:59
14.	"Mr. Eliminator" (B-side to "Blood and Roses")	Dick Dale	2:02
Total length:			44:08

== Personnel ==
Credits adapted from the album's liner notes.

The Smithereens

- Jim Babjak – guitar, vocals (13)
- Dennis Diken – drums, percussion, backing vocals
- Pat DiNizio – vocals, guitar
- Mike Mesaros – bass guitar, backing vocals

Additional musicians

- Jeffrey Berman – vibraphone (8)
- Frank Christian – acoustic guitar (8)
- Marshall Crenshaw (credited as "Jerome Jerome") – Hammond organ and piano (1), six-string bass (13)
- Don Dixon – piano, percussion, backing vocals
- Mark Johnson – harmony and backing vocals (3)
- Joe Kernich – piano (7)
- Kenny Margolis – accordion (4)
- John Rokosny – tremolo rhythm guitar (2)
- Suzanne Vega – backing vocals (8)

Technical

- Don Dixon – producer
- James A. Ball – associate producer, engineer
- Gray Russell – engineer
- Carol Cafiero – assistant engineer
- Frank Pekoc – assistant engineer
- Paul Special – assistant engineer
- Greg Calbi – mastering (Sterling Sound, NYC)
- Arthur K. Miller – art direction, design
- Pat DiNizio – cover concept
- Jan Dusing – photography

== Charts ==
=== Weekly charts ===
Chart (1986)	Peak position
US Billboard 200	51
Chart (1987)	Peak position
Australia (Kent Music Report)	97
UK Indie Chart	5

=== Year-end charts ===
Chart (1987)	Position
US Billboard 200	73
