= Blow Up (The Smithereens album) =

Studio album by The Smithereens
- Released: September 10, 1991
- Recorded: A&M Studios, Los Angeles, CA; Brooklyn Recording, Los Angeles; Mixed at A&M Studios, One On One Recording - The Grey Room, Los Angeles, CA
- Genre: Rock; alternative rock; power pop
- Length: 47:58
- Label: Capitol
- Producer: Ed Stasium

The Smithereens chronology
11 (1989)	Blow Up (1991)	A Date with The Smithereens (1994)

Singles from Blow Up
- 1. "Top of the Pops" Released: August 1991; 2. "Too Much Passion" Released: December 1991

Professional ratings
Review scores
Source	Rating
Allmusic	2.5/5 stars
Rolling Stone	3/5 stars

Blow Up is the fourth full-length studio album by the Smithereens, released in September 1991 by Capitol Records. The album charted at #120 in the U.S. in October 1991. The album's second single, "Too Much Passion", became the group's second top-40 single, peaking at #37. Top of the Pops was released as the first single of the album.

== Background ==
The Smithereens followed their previous album, the relatively successful 11 (1989), with what Allmusic's Jason Damas called "their most straightforward and mainstream-ready release yet." Produced, like its predecessor, by Ed Stasium, Blow Up features songwriting collaborations with Diane Warren ("Nothing's Gonna Stop Us Now", "I Don't Want to Miss a Thing") and Julian Lennon on two of the album's most accessible tracks. Blow Up was released the same month as Nirvana's Nevermind, an album that would quickly have a huge impact on alternative radio formats, "squeezing out largely pop-oriented bands like the Smithereens," according to Damas. "If there was ever a time for an alternative band to opt for a slicker sound," he said, "1991 wasn't it."

Songwriter Pat DiNizio was quoted on the band's website as saying, "It's an eclectic album in that it showcases every one of our musical influences." Described as an "edgy riff rocker" on the website, "Top of the Pops" has an analogy "that English rock fans should pick up on," referring to the British TV programme with the same name. "Too Much Passion", with its full string section and Motown-style backing vocals, is a result of DiNizio's desire to "write the sort of song Smokey Robinson might have written in 1966." The ballad "Evening Dress" is lyrically inspired by a short story by the Japanese author Yukio Mishima, and "Indigo Blues" is a R&B song on which Los Lobos's Steve Berlin guests as a "one-man sax section." Co-written with Dianne Warren, "Get a Hold of My Heart" features harmony vocals by Carlene Carter, and, according to DiNizio, "Tell Me When Did Things Go So Wrong" is the band's first overtly political song about "what I feel society has turned into." DiNizio described the Julian Lennon co-write "If You Want the Sun to Shine" as a thing between the Beatles' "I Am the Walrus" and Led Zeppelin's "Kashmir". DiNizio called the album "the ultimate pop sampler."

When Blow Up failed to match the success of the band's previous album, they were dropped by Capitol and moved to RCA for 1994's A Date with the Smithereens.

== Critical reviews ==
Dubois Daniels, writing for OffBeat magazine, wrote that the Smithereens "retain their combination of pop vocal melodies over big crunchy guitars, but add keyboards and strings on most of the cuts." He felt that the album is much softer than their previous albums, and that the band "seems to have traded some of their edge for a more pop sound ... but the pop sound has not taken over completely." Rolling Stone's Wayne King wrote, "For those who'd shrug [the Smithereens] off as hopelessly retro, the group makes moves like inviting the Cowsills to sing backup on one song from Blow Up, a gesture either so warped it's cool or just plain pathetic. ... But to dismiss the Smithereens as mere revivalists would be wrong." King felt that, compared to the band's previous album, 11, where producer Ed Stasium "enlarged the group's sound", the band and their producer have made a more versatile and fluid album with Blow Up. He noted that Pat DiNizio "still examines romance as the distance sets in; almost every song deals with loss, resignation, regret."

Among retrospective reviews, Jason Damas of AllMusic said that the Smithereens never released a bad album, and that Blow Up is "in fact a quite good one." He described it as a collection of "catchy, blue-collar power pop distinguished by DiNizio's often moody outlook." Ira Robbins of Trouser Press wrote that the album gets off to a good start with "Top of the Pops" and "Too Much Passion," but then runs out of gas during the third track. Robbins felt that the material was "tired" and "unimproved by restrained playing and arrangements that cover the band's assets in guest keyboards, vocals, strings and saxophone."

== Album cover and title ==
Blow Up's cover design is by movie poster/title sequence artist Saul Bass (Vertigo, West Side Story, North by Northwest, Psycho). Being dedicated film fans, the Smithereens managed to convince Bass that Blow Up should be his first album cover work. The album is named after Michelangelo Antonioni’s 1966 art house film Blowup.

== Track listing ==
All tracks are written by Pat DiNizio, except where noted

No.	Title	Writer(s)	Length
1.	"Top of the Pops"		4:32
2.	"Too Much Passion"		4:35
3.	"Tell Me When Did Things Go So Wrong"		2:22
4.	"Evening Dress"		3:12
5.	"Get a Hold of My Heart"	DiNizio, Diane Warren	4:22
6.	"Indigo Blues"		4:58
7.	"Now and Then"	Jim Babjak	3:50
8.	"Girl in Room 12"		3:22
9.	"Anywhere You Are"		3:44
10.	"Over and Over Again"		3:17
11.	"It's Alright"		3:45
12.	"If You Want the Sun to Shine"	DiNizio, Julian Lennon	5:58

== Personnel ==
The Smithereens

- Pat DiNizio – vocals, guitar, harmonica
- Jim Babjak – guitar, vocals
- Dennis Diken – drums, percussion, vocals
- Mike Mesaros – bass, vocals

Additional musicians

- Kenny Margolis – Hammond organ, piano, keyboards
- Michael Hamilton – additional guitar, keyboards, Mellotron
- Ed Stasium – percussion, backing vocals
- Kevin Savigar – keyboards on "Get a Hold of My Heart" and "If You Want the Sun to Shine"
- Steve Berlin – saxophone on "Indigo Blues"
- Diana Graselli – backing vocals on "Top of the Pops" and "Too Much Passion"
- Maria Vidal – backing vocals on "Top of the Pops"
- Carlene Carter – backing vocals on "Get a Hold of My Heart"
- Max Babjak – backing vocals on "Indigo Blues"
- The Cowsills – backing vocals on "Now and Then"
- Alex Acuña – percussion on "Too Much Passion"
- Sid Paige – violin
- Joel Derouin – violin
- Berj Garabedian – violin
- Michele Richards – violin
- Larry Corbett – cello
- Suzie Katayama – cello
- Melissa Hasin – cello
- David Campbell – String arrangements on "Too Much Passion", "Get a Hold of My Heart" and "If You Want the Sun to Shine"

Production personnel

- Ed Stasium – producer, mixing
- Paul Hamingson – engineer, mixing assistant
- Randy Wine – assistant engineer (at A&M)
- John Aguto – assistant engineer (at A&M)
- Scott Stillman – assistant engineer (at Brooklyn)
- Lori Fumar – assistant engineer (at One On One)
- Dave Collins – digital editing
- Greg Calbi – mastering
- Saul Bass – cover art
- The Smithereens – art direction
- Tommy Steele – art direction
- Pietro Alfieri – design
- Dewey Nicks – photography

== Charts ==
Chart performance for Blow Up
Chart (1991)	Peak position
Australian Albums (ARIA)	68
US Billboard 200	120
