= 11 (The Smithereens album) =

Studio album by The Smithereens
- Released: October 24, 1989
- Recorded: June–July 1989
- Studio: American Recording, Los Angeles; Rumbo Recorders, Los Angeles; The Grey Room, Los Angeles
- Genre: Rock
- Length: 33:57
- Label: Capitol
- Producer: Ed Stasium

The Smithereens chronology
Green Thoughts (1988)	11 (1989)	Blow Up (1991)

Singles from 11
- 1. "A Girl Like You" Released: September 2, 1989; 2. "Blues Before and After" Released: January 22, 1990; 3. "Yesterday Girl" Released: April 30, 1990; 4. "Blue Period" Released: July 1990

Professional ratings
Review scores
Source	Rating
AllMusic	3/5 stars
Chicago Tribune	3/4 stars
The Encyclopedia of Popular Music	4/5 stars

11 is the third studio album by American rock band The Smithereens, released on October 24, 1989, by Capitol Records. It includes the Billboard Top 40 single "A Girl Like You". The album was certified gold by the Recording Industry Association of America in June 1990.

The album title was inspired by the film Ocean's 11, "with a little push from Spinal Tap's famous line, 'This one goes to 11'", according to guitarist Jim Babjak.

== Background ==
The Smithereens switched producers for the album, going from Don Dixon, who had produced their first two albums, to Ed Stasium, who had produced albums by the Ramones and Living Colour. "I'm not sure what we were looking for... maybe a heavier guitar sound, like in "A Girl Like You". We were trying to preserve our integrity, yet find a home on radio", lead singer Pat DiNizio said.

"A Girl Like You" was written by DiNizio on assignment for Cameron Crowe's film Say Anything.... DiNizio based the lyrics on bits of dialogue in the screenplay. When the film's producer asked DiNizio to change the lyrics because it revealed too much of the plot, he refused, and the band decided to keep the song for their next album, 11. Madonna was originally enlisted to sing the harmony vocals, but failed to show up for the recording session. Instead, the band got Maria Vidal to do the vocals.

The song peaked at No. 2 on Billboard's Mainstream Rock chart and at No. 3 on the Modern Rock chart. It became the band's first Top 40 entry on the Billboard Hot 100, peaking at No. 38 and spending 20 weeks on the chart.

== Track listing ==
All tracks are written by Pat DiNizio, except where noted.

No.	Title	Writer(s)	Length
1.	"A Girl Like You"		4:42
2.	"Blues Before and After"		3:15
3.	"Blue Period"		2:57
4.	"Baby Be Good"		3:20
5.	"Room Without a View"		4:09
6.	"Yesterday Girl"		3:27
7.	"Cut Flowers"	Jim Babjak, DiNizio	3:40
8.	"William Wilson"		3:33
9.	"Maria Elena"		2:48
10.	"Kiss Your Tears Away"		3:10

== Personnel ==
Credits adapted from the album's liner notes.

The Smithereens

- Pat DiNizio – vocals, guitar, string arrangement on "Blue Period"
- Jim Babjak – guitar
- Dennis Diken – drums, percussion, cover concept
- Mike Mesaros – bass

Additional musicians

- Belinda Carlisle – vocal on "Blue Period"
- Michael Hamilton – guitar on "A Girl Like You", "Blues Before and After", "Room Without a View" and "Kiss Your Tears Away"
- The Honeys (Ginger Blake, Diane Rovell, Marilyn Wilson) – background vocals on "Baby Be Good" and "Cut Flowers"
- Kenny Margolis – piano, electric piano, accordion, harpsichord, synthesizer
- Ed Stasium – background vocals, percussion
- Gerri Sutyak – cello on "Blue Period"
- Maria Vidal – background vocals on "A Girl Like You"

Production personnel

- Jim Dineen – assistant engineer
- Mick Haggerty – design
- Paul Hamingson – engineer
- Gina Immel – assistant engineer
- Shirley Greer – assistant engineer
- Dewey Nicks – photography
- Ed Stasium – producer
- Francine Stasium – production coordination
- Tommy Steele – art direction

== Charts ==
Chart performance for 11
Chart (1989)	Peak position
Australian Albums (ARIA)	96
US Top Pop Albums (Billboard)	41
