= Drown in My Own Tears (The Smithereens song) =

Single by The Smithereens

from the album Green Thoughts
- B-side: "House We Used to Live In"
- Released: September 28, 1988
- Recorded: Capitol (Hollywood)
- Genre: Power pop, alternative rock
- Length: 3:09
- Label: Capitol
- Songwriter: Pat DiNizio
- Producer: Don Dixon

The Smithereens singles chronology
"House We Used to Live In" (1988)	"Drown in My Own Tears" (1988)	"A Girl Like You" (1989)

"Drown in My Own Tears" is a song by the American alternative rock group The Smithereens. It is the third single released in support of their second album Green Thoughts.

== Background ==
Frontman Pat DiNizio came up with the guitar riff at the soundcheck for the last concert of the Especially for You tour. The title was taken from the song of the same name, best known in the version released as a single in 1956 by Ray Charles, and the lyrics were inspired by the Beatles' "No Reply".

== Release ==
"Drown in My Own Tears" was released as the third single from the band's sophomore album, Green Thoughts. The single reached number 34 on the US Mainstream Rock Charts.

== Formats and track listing ==
All songs written by Pat DiNizio

US 7" single (B-44238)

1. "Drown in My Own Tears" – 3:09
2. "House We Used to Live In" – 4:00

== Charts ==
Chart (1988)	Peak position
US Mainstream Rock (Billboard)	34
