= Blue Period (song) =

Single by The Smithereens featuring Belinda Carlisle

from the album 11
- B-side: "Maria Elena (acoustic version)"
- Released: July 1990
- Recorded: American Recording, Rumbo Recorders, The Grey Room, Los Angeles, CA
- Genre: Power pop, alternative rock
- Length: 2:53
- Label: Enigma
- Songwriter(s): Pat DiNizio
- Producer(s): Ed Stasium

The Smithereens featuring Belinda Carlisle singles chronology
"Yesterday Girl" (1990)	"Blue Period" (1990)	"Top of the Pops" (1991)

"Blue Period" is a song by the American alternative rock group The Smithereens. It is the fourth single released in support of their third album 11. It features singer Belinda Carlisle performing vocals.

== Formats and track listing ==
All songs written by Pat DiNizio

European 7" single (ENV21)

1. "Blue Period" – 2:53
2. "Maria Elena (acoustic version)" – 2:42

European CD single (ENVCD 21)

1. "Blue Period" – 2:53
2. "Room Without a View" – 4:09
3. "Maria Elena (acoustic version)" – 2:42

== Charts ==
Chart (1990)	Peak position
Australia (ARIA)	162
UK Singles Chart	99
