= Yesterday Girl (song) =

Single by The Smithereens

from the album 11
- B-side: "Room Without a View"
- Released: April 30, 1990
- Recorded: American Recording, Rumbo Recorders, The Grey Room, Los Angeles, CA
- Genre: Power pop, alternative rock
- Length: 3:27
- Label: Capitol/Enigma
- Songwriter: Pat DiNizio
- Producer: Ed Stasium

The Smithereens singles chronology
"Blues Before and After" (1990)	"Yesterday Girl" (1990)	"Blue Period" (1990)

"Yesterday Girl" is a song by the American alternative rock group The Smithereens. It is the third single released in support of their third album 11.

Pat DiNizio said that the music was based on Louie Louie by The Kingsmen. The song was written about the downsides to success.

== Formats and track listing ==
All songs written by Pat DiNizio

US cassette single (4JM-44587)

1. "Yesterday Girl" – 3:27
2. "Room Without a View" – 4:09
3. "Behind the Wall of Sleep (MTV Unplugged)" – 4:02

== Charts ==
Chart (1990)	Peak position
Canada Top Singles (RPM)	76
US Mainstream Rock (Billboard)	20
US Alternative Airplay (Billboard)	16
