= House We Used to Live In =

Single by The Smithereens

from the album Green Thoughts
- B-side: "Ruler of My Heart"
- Released: August 3, 1988
- Recorded: Capitol (Hollywood)
- Genre: Power pop, alternative rock
- Length: 4:00
- Label: Capitol
- Songwriter: Pat DiNizio
- Producer: Don Dixon

The Smithereens singles chronology
"Only a Memory" (1988)	"House We Used to Live In" (1988)	"Drown in My Own Tears" (1988)

"House We Used to Live In" is a song by the American alternative rock group The Smithereens. It is the second single released in support of their second album Green Thoughts.

== Background ==
"House We Used to Live In" was partially inspired by frontman Pat DiNizio's parents. The lyrics were based on DiNizio's parents losing their house to the IRS after their divorce. DiNizio commented, "The lyrics are partially about that. They could also be about the break-up of a marriage or a relationship, not necessarily my parents'."

== Release ==
"House We Used to Live In" was released as the second single from the band's sophomore album, Green Thoughts. The single reached number 14 on the US Mainstream Rock Charts.

== Formats and track listing ==
All songs written by Pat DiNizio, except where noted.

US 12" single (ENVT 2)

1. "House We Used to Live In" – 4:00
2. "Ruler of My Heart" (Allen Toussaint) – 3:02
3. "House We Used to Live In (live)" – 4:34

UK 7" single (ENV 2)

1. "House We Used to Live In" – 4:00
2. "Ruler of My Heart" (Allen Toussaint) – 3:02

UK CD single (ENVCD 2)

1. "House We Used to Live In" – 4:03
2. "Ruler of My Heart" (Allen Toussaint) – 3:04
3. "House We Used to Live In (live)" – 7:03
4. "Blood and Roses (live)" – 5:47

== Charts ==
Chart (1988)	Peak position
US Mainstream Rock (Billboard)	14
