= Green Thoughts =

1988 studio album by the Smithereens

Studio album by the Smithereens
- Released: March 22, 1988
- Recorded: December 1987
- Studio: Capitol, Hollywood
- Genre: Power pop, alternative rock
- Length: 35:16
- Label: Enigma/Capitol
- Producer: Don Dixon

The Smithereens chronology
Especially for You (1986)	Green Thoughts (1988)	11 (1989)

Singles from Green Thoughts
- 1. "Only a Memory" Released: 6 April 1988; 2. "House We Used to Live In" Released: 3 August 1988; 3. "Drown in My Own Tears" Released: 28 September 1988

Professional ratings
Review scores
Source	Rating
AllMusic	4.5/5 stars
Goldmine	4/5 stars
Record Collector	4/5 stars
Rolling Stone	4/5 stars
The Village Voice	C+

Green Thoughts is the second studio album by the Smithereens, released March 22, 1988 by Enigma/Capitol Records. The single, "Only a Memory", reached No. 92 on the Billboard Hot 100 and topped the Album Rock Tracks chart in 1988.

== Background ==
The Smithereens had toured from May 1986 to September 1987 in support of their debut album, 1986's Especially for You. During the tour songwriter Pat DiNizio had been working on new song ideas for what was to become the Green Thoughts album. Drummer Dennis Diken: "I remember being in the van during the last leg of the EFY [Especially for You] tour seeing Pat sitting in the last set of seats with a recording Walkman, singing riff ideas into a microphone. I know he was very concerned about and consumed by the prospect of coming up with the material for our second album and avoiding a sophomore slump. Pat had the makings of the songs in dribs and drabs and as he put it at the time, ‘I just needed to get organized’."

In August 1987, the band made plans to record the album in November, followed by a January 1988 release. They initially hoped to title it Four More Respected Gentlemen in reference to an unreleased album from 1968 by the English rock band the Kinks. DiNizio explained contemporaneously that the title would serve as both an inside-joke and an expression of his love for the songwriting style of British Invasion groups: "I like concise songs, classic structures, with a hard edge. The songs I write are the kind I like to hear, but by accident they've turned out to be commercial."

After returning to the US, the band began work on Green Thoughts. Pat DiNizio: "Green Thoughts was written intuitively, from the gut. I found myself in a situation where I had to come up with virtually all the songs in a very short period of time. I had to lock myself in my apartment in New York City, take the phone off the hook, distance myself from every relationship I had, and set about the business of putting together bits of melodies, bits of lyrics and song titles into album form. Four weeks later I emerged from the apartment slightly crazed, but I did have an album under my belt." The band then convened in their rehearsal studio and spent two weeks working on song arrangements. The band chose to record in Capitol Studios in Los Angeles, and Don Dixon, who had produced their debut album, was again enlisted to produce. The album, including B-sides, was recorded and mixed in sixteen days. The first two days of the sessions were dedicated to recording the basic tracks for the entire album and concentrating on keeper takes for the bass and drums. The guitars and vocals were rerecorded later with the proper amps and microphones. The band preferred to take an intuitive and spontaneous approach to recording, according to DiNizio, "get virtually everything onto the album by the first or second take. If it's not happening then, it usually doesn't happen." Going for a tougher sound than on their previous album, the Smithereens managed to recreate the guitar power of their live shows on Green Thoughts. "That's partly because they were able to buy Marshalls between albums", Don Dixon explained.

Lyrically, the album contains what Dave Simons, writing for Songwriter101.com, describes as "angst-filled odes to failed romance". DiNizio: "I was always interested lyrically in the darker side of relationships. The lyrics on Green Thoughts, however, are not necessarily reflective of an unhappy state of mind in terms of my personal relationships while I was writing the album. ... If I were as troubled as a lot of the lyric imagery conveys, I'd be in a terrible mess personally." Talking to Terry Gross on Fresh Air about songwriting, DiNizio said: "I've never really been into wordplay or being clever lyrically for the sake of being clever. It just doesn't make any sense to me. I need the lyrics to have some sort of meaning that I can relate to on some sort of emotional level."

Among the songs recorded during the album sessions were cover versions of "Lust for Life", "Ruler of My Heart", "One After 909" and "Something Stupid". They were all used as B-sides for future singles.

Green Thoughts was released 22 March 1988. It reached No. 60 on Billboard 200 and No. 17 on the UK Indie Chart.

== Songs ==
- "Only a Memory" — The song started life during a soundcheck in Madrid on the Especially for You European tour in January 1987. Luckily for Pat DiNizio, the band's roadie was there with his pocket tape recorder when he came up with the intro riff. DiNizio: "[He] heard me scream "Chopper, tape this!!" I would have never remembered it otherwise."
- House We Used to Live In — Part autobiographical, part fiction. Inspired by DiNizio's parents losing their house to the IRS after their divorce. DiNizio: "The lyrics are partially about that. They could also be about the break-up of a marriage or a relationship, not necessarily my parents'."
- "Something New" — DiNizio: "That lyric came moments after a breakup with a girlfriend. And I was in the shower, and it just sort of hit. And the song sort of wrote itself. ... That's why I'm particularly happy with those set of lyrics. Although they are as simple as they are, they're very heartfelt. They have a lot of personal meaning to me."
- "Especially for You" — The song was an attempt at "writing the kind of song Burt Bacharach and Hal David would have written for Dionne Warwick in the '60s", DiNizio said. The Smithereens' first album was called Especially for You but there was no song with that title on the album, "so I decided to confuse everyone by using that title for the second album."
- "Drown in My Own Tears" — DiNizio came up with the guitar riff at the soundcheck for the last concert of the Especially for You tour. The title was taken from the song of the same name, best known in the version released as a single in 1956 by Ray Charles, and the lyrics were inspired by the Beatles' "No Reply".
- "Elaine" — One of DiNizio's earliest songs, originally demoed in 1980.
- "If the Sun Doesn't Shine" — With its Beach Boys-inspired backing vocals, the song is "a definite homage to Brian Wilson", according to DiNizio.
- "Green Thoughts" — As green is most commonly associated with envy, DiNizio said he took a great deal of liberty with the song title: "It's really about jealousy and suspicion in terms of a relationship." The song title was taken from a book of the same name. "The title sort of wrote the lyrics", DiNizio said.

== Reception ==
David Browne, writing for Rolling Stone, gave the album 4 stars out of 5, noting that despite Pat DiNizio's "gloomy" lyrical outlook, the three other musicians are in a "much feistier mood". Apart from a couple of songs with "pseudo-Merseybeat touches", the Smithereens turn other songs into "utterly contemporary wall-of-guitar onslaughts". He added that "even if Pat DiNizio isn't the type of guy you'd invite to your party, Green Thoughts is the kind of album you'll want to bring along." Critic Robert Christgau gave the album a C+ rating, commenting: "I know Pat DiNizio is Beatlesque, but is that why he writes cheerful-sounding love songs that turn out to be kind of mean when you pay attention?"

Retrospective reviews were generally positive. AllMusic's Jason Ankeny gave the album 4½ stars out of 5, calling it an "impressive batch of superbly constructed pop gems", singling out "Only a Memory", "House We Used to Live In" and "Drown in My Own Tears" as "immediately ingratiating". Ankeny also highlighted the album's "curveballs": "the countryish "Something New," the lovely ballad "Especially for You," and the dark, atmospheric "Deep Black," all of which deliver intriguing variations on the Smithereens' basic power pop formula." Terry Staunton of Record Collector gave it 4 stars out of 5, writing that the band had been "broadening their palette" since their first album, delivering "a veritable jukebox of radiofriendly styles." He added: "It's all great fun, performed with delicacy and an innate understanding of what makes an eminently hummable tune." Goldmine magazine gave it 4 stars out of 5, calling it "a solid, consistent effort" and one of the Smithereens' "most enduring records."

== Track listing ==
All tracks are written by Pat DiNizio, except where noted.

No.	Title	Writer(s)	Length
1.	"Only a Memory"		3:42
2.	"House We Used to Live In"		4:00
3.	"Something New"		1:55
4.	"The World We Know"		3:47
5.	"Especially for You"	DiNizio, Jim Babjak	3:09
6.	"Drown in My Own Tears"		3:09
7.	"Deep Black"		2:55
8.	"Elaine"		2:31
9.	"Spellbound"		4:09
10.	"If the Sun Doesn't Shine"		3:31
11.	"Green Thoughts"		2:28

== Personnel ==
The Smithereens

- Jim Babjak – guitar
- Dennis Diken – drums, percussion, backing vocals
- Pat DiNizio – vocals, guitar
- Mike Mesaros – bass guitar, backing vocals

Additional musicians

- Steve Berlin – saxophone (5)
- Don Dixon – piano, guitar, backing vocals
- Marti Jones – vocals (1)
- Kenny Margolis – piano (2, 5, 9), harpsichord (10), accordion (3)
- Del Shannon – vocals (4)

Technical

- Don Dixon – production
- James A. Ball – engineering
- Peter Doell – assistant engineering
- Mike Hamilton – production coordination
- Greg Calbi – mastering
- Tommy Steele – art direction, design
- Pat DiNizio – art direction
- Jeff Lancaster – design
- Deborah Feingold – photography

== Charts ==
Charts (1988)	Peak position
Australia (Kent Music Report)	85
UK Indie Chart	7
US Billboard 200	60
