= Strangers When We Meet (The Smithereens song) =

Single by The Smithereens

from the album Especially for You
- B-side: "The Seeker"
- Released: August 1987
- Recorded: The Record Plant, New York City
- Genre: Power pop, alternative rock
- Length: 3:35
- Label: Enigma
- Songwriter(s): Pat DiNizio
- Producer(s): Don Dixon

The Smithereens singles chronology
"In a Lonely Place" (1986)	"Strangers When We Meet" (1987)	"Only a Memory" (1988)

"Strangers When We Meet" is a song by the American alternative rock group The Smithereens, released as a European-only single in 1987. It is the fourth single released in support of their debut album Especially for You.

== Background ==
According to songwriter Pat DiNizio, the song was his attempt to rewrite the Beach Boys' "Don't Worry Baby", "but in the end it turned into something else altogether", he said. The title was taken from the 1960 film of the same name and the lyrics were directly inspired by the plot. Written in 1984, the song was considered by the band as the main "pop hit single" candidate on the album.

== Release ==
In Europe, "Strangers When We Meet" was released as the fourth single from the band's debut album Especially for You. The single reached number 21 on the UK Indie Charts.

== Formats and track listing ==
UK 7" single (Enig 3)

1. "Strangers When We Meet" (Pat DiNizio) – 3:35
2. "The Seeker" (Pete Townshend) – 3:08

UK 12" single (Enig 31)

1. "Strangers When We Meet" (DiNizio) – 3:35
2. "The Seeker" (Townshend) – 3:08
3. "Hang Ten High" (Dominic Frontiere) – 2:14

== Charts ==
Chart (1987)	Peak position
UK Indie Chart	21

== Personnel ==
The Smithereens

- Jim Babjak – guitar
- Dennis Diken – drums, percussion, backing vocals
- Pat DiNizio – vocals, guitar
- Mike Mesaros – bass guitar, backing vocals

Additional musicians

- Marshall Crenshaw – Hammond organ, piano on "Strangers When We Meet"

Technical

- Don Dixon – production on "Strangers When We Meet"
- Pat DiNizio – production on "The Seeker"
- Andy Shernoff – production on "Hang Ten High"

Notes

- "Strangers When We Meet" recorded 1985 at the Record Plant, New York City
- "The Seeker" recorded spring 1987 at the Record Plant, New York City
- "Hang Ten High" recorded summer 1982 at Rock Bite Studios, New York City
