= The Grip Weeds =

- Origin: Highland Park, New Jersey, United States
- Genres: Power pop, psychedelic rock
- Years active: 1988–present
- Labels: Jem Recordings, Ground Up Records, Twang! Records, Rainbow Quartz Records, Wicked Cool Records, Buy Or Die Compact Discs
- Members: Rick Reil; Kurt Reil; Kristin Pinell; Dave DeSantis
- Website: gripweeds.com

The Grip Weeds are an American rock band from Highland Park, New Jersey.

== History ==
The Grip Weeds were formed in 1988 in New Brunswick, New Jersey, by brothers Rick Reil (guitar) and Kurt Reil (drums). The band is named after the fictional character “Musketeer Gripweed”, played by John Lennon in Richard Lester’s 1967 motion picture How I Won The War. The Reil brothers are joined by guitarist Kristin Pinell, a veteran of New York City's The Rooks. and bassist Dave DeSantis, who joined the band in 2012.

Their music is often classified in the power pop, psychedelic rock and garage rock categories. Influences include The Beatles, The Who, Big Star, Buffalo Springfield, The Yardbirds, The Smithereens, The Byrds, Jefferson Airplane, and others.

The Grip Weeds began their recording career with the 1992 three-song independent release See You Through on their own Ground Up Records label, followed by the single “She Brings The Rain b/w Strange Bird” for the German Twang! label. Their 1994 full-length album debut House Of Vibes, was the first to be recorded in their own fully equipped home studio, also known as “The House Of Vibes”. Known for its laid back atmosphere and a collection of vintage sound equipment and instruments, it has also been put to use by many other recording artists including The Smithereens, Jim Babjak’s Buzzed Meg, Najma Akhtar and Gary Lucas, The Swingin' Neckbreakers, The Anderson Council and more. A second album, for Buy Or Die Compact Discs, The Sound Is In You, followed in 1998. The band signed with Rainbow Quartz Records for their 2001 release Summer Of A Thousand Years, and followed it up with Giant On The Beach in 2004. “Little Steven” Van Zandt’s Wicked Cool label released the compilation CD Infinite Soul: The Best Of The Grip Weeds in 2008, and Van Zandt has been a vocal supporter of the band. Rainbow Quartz released the double CD and double vinyl LP Strange Change Machine in June 2010. 2012 saw the release on Ground Up Records of a live album, Speed of Live (In Concert: In New Jersey) along with a companion DVD release, Live Vibes featuring a "live in the studio" performance taped at The House Of Vibes. Ground Up Records followed the live releases with the 2013 rarities collection, Inner Grooves (Rare And Under-Released Tracks). After signing with Jem Recordings, the band released their sixth studio album How I Won The War on April 7, 2015. A 2015 concert at the Tribeca Performing Arts Center in New York City was filmed and recorded, and released on December 2, 2016, as a limited edition DVD titled Force Of Nature Live In NYC. A companion CD, Force Of Nature Live Via Satellite was released simultaneously, consisting of a 2016 live studio performance recorded for Sirius/XM’s The Loft satellite radio show. On October 19, 2018, Jem Records released The Grip Weeds' seventh album, Trip Around The Sun on compact disc, vinyl LP and download formats. 2020 and 2021 saw the band contributing tracks to the tribute albums Jem Records Celebrates John Lennon, and Jem Records Celebrates Brian Wilson. October 2021 saw the Jem Records release of DiG, an album of cover songs recorded during the 2020 and 2021 COVID-19 pandemic lockdown. DiG was released on vinyl LP and download formats, and in 1 CD and 2 CD versions. An additional accompanying CD A Deeper DiG was released on the band's own Ground Up Records label.

Throughout their career, The Grip Weeds have performed at venues across the United States, and internationally, including the South By Southwest (SXSW) conference in Austin, Texas, The Cavern Club in Liverpool, England, and several tours of Europe, among others.

== Members ==
Current Lineup

- Kurt Reil - vocals, drums (1988–present)
- Rick Reil - vocals, keyboards, guitar (1988–present)
- Kristin Pinell - guitar, vocals (1993–present)
- Dave DeSantis - bass (2012–present)

Former Members

- Jeff Surawski (now performing as Jeff Jefferson) - bass (1988–1989)
- Chris Breetveld - bass (1989–1991)
- Mick Hargrave (now Hargreaves) - bass (1991–1996)
- Tim Mesko - guitar, vocals (1988–1993)
- Michael Nattboy - bass (1997–2002)
- Dennis Ambrose - bass (2002–2003)
- Michael Kelly - bass (2003–2012)

== Discography ==
- See You Through (3 Song EP) (Ground Up Records, 1992)
- She Brings The Rain/Strange Bird (7-inch Single) (Twang! Records, 1993)
- House Of Vibes (Ground Up Records, 1994)
- We’re Not Getting Through/I Can Hear The Grass Grow (7-inch Single) (Twang! Records, 1996)
- The Sound Is In You (Buy Or Die Compact Discs, 1998)
- Summer Of A Thousand Years (Rainbow Quartz Records, 2001)
- The Sound Is In You (Reissue, Remixed With Bonus Tracks) (Rainbow Quartz Records, 2003)
- Giant On The Beach (Rainbow Quartz Records, 2004, Reissued 2020)
- House Of Vibes Revisited (Reissue, Remixed With Bonus Tracks) (Ground Up Records, 2007)
- Infinite Soul: The Best Of The Grip Weeds (Wicked Cool Records, 2008)
- Strange Change Machine (Rainbow Quartz Records, 2010)
- Under the Influence Of Christmas (Rainbow Quartz/Redeye, 2011)
- Speed of Live (In Concert: In New Jersey) (Ground Up Records, 2012)
- Inner Grooves (Rare And Under-Released Tracks) (Ground Up Records, 2013)
- How I Won The War (Jem Recordings, 2015)
- Force Of Nature Live Via Satellite (Ground Up Records, 2016)
- Trip Around The Sun (Jem Recordings, 2018)
- DiG (Jem Recordings, 2021)
- A Deeper DiG (Ground Up Records, 2021)
- Soul Bender (Jem Recordings, 2025)
