= Only a Memory =

Single by The Smithereens

from the album Green Thoughts
- B-side: "The Seeker"
- Released: April 6, 1988
- Recorded: Capitol (Hollywood)
- Genre: Power pop, alternative rock
- Length: 3:39
- Label: Capitol
- Songwriter: Pat DiNizio
- Producer: Don Dixon

The Smithereens singles chronology
"Strangers When We Meet" (1986)	"Only a Memory" (1988)	"House We Used to Live In" (1988)

Music video
- "Only a Memory" on YouTube

"Only a Memory" is a song by the American alternative rock group The Smithereens. It is the first single released in support of their second album Green Thoughts.

== Background ==
"Only a Memory" started life during a soundcheck in Madrid on the Especially for You European tour in January 1987. Luckily for frontman Pat DiNizio, the band's roadie was there with his pocket tape recorder when he came up with the intro riff. DiNizio recalled, "[He] heard me scream "Chopper, tape this!!" I would have never remembered it otherwise."

== Release ==
"Only a Memory" was released as the first single from the band's sophomore album, Green Thoughts. The single was the band's most commercially successful single release to that point, topping the US Mainstream Rock Charts and becoming the first Smithereens song to hit the Billboard Hot 100, reaching number 92.

== In popular culture ==
On May 18, 2010, the song was made available to download in the Rock Band digital store. The song also appeared in the 1988 baseball film Bull Durham.

== Formats and track listing ==
All songs written by Pat DiNizio, except where noted.

US 7" single (B-44150)

1. "Only a Memory" – 3:39
2. "The Seeker" (Pete Townshend) – 3:22

European 7" single (SMIT 1)

1. "Only a Memory" – 3:39
2. "Lust for Life" (David Bowie, Iggy Pop) – 5:10

European 12" single (SMIT T 1)

1. "Only a Memory" – 3:39
2. "Lust for Life" (David Bowie, Iggy Pop) – 5:10
3. "Something New" – 1:53

== Charts ==
Chart (1988)	Peak position
US Billboard Hot 100	92
US Mainstream Rock (Billboard)	1
