= A Girl Like You (The Smithereens song) =

Single by The Smithereens

from the album 11
- B-side: "Cut Flowers"
- Released: September 2, 1989
- Studio: American Recording, Rumbo Recorders, The Grey Room, Los Angeles, CA
- Genre: Power pop
- Length: 4:42
- Label: Enigma
- Songwriter: Pat DiNizio
- Producer: Ed Stasium

The Smithereens singles chronology
"Drown in My Own Tears" (1988)	"A Girl Like You" (1989)	"Blues Before and After" (1990)

"A Girl Like You" is a song by the American alternative rock group The Smithereens. It is the first single released in support of their third album 11.

The song was to be used in the film Say Anything..., but it was ultimately cut because the producers believed the song revealed too much of the story. Backing vocals were provided by Maria Vidal.

== Background ==
Frontman Pat DiNizio attributed the song's harder guitar sound to new producer Ed Stasium: "[The album had] a heavier guitar sound, like in "A Girl Like You". We were trying to preserve our integrity, yet find a home on radio", lead singer Pat DiNizio said.

"A Girl Like You" was written by DiNizio on assignment for Cameron Crowe's film Say Anything.... DiNizio based the lyrics on bits of dialogue in the screenplay. When the film's producer asked DiNizio to change the lyrics, because it revealed too much of the plot, he refused, and the band decided to keep the song for their next album, 11. Pat DiNizio stated that he wrote the lyrics with a separate meaning from the movie in mind.

Madonna was originally enlisted to sing the harmony vocals, but failed to show up for the recording session. Instead, the band got Maria Vidal to do the vocals.

== Release ==
"A Girl Like You" was released as the first single from the band's third album, 11. The track peaked at No. 2 on Billboard's Mainstream Rock chart and at No. 3 on the magazine's Modern Rock chart. It became the band's first Top 40 entry on the Billboard Hot 100, peaking at No. 38 and spending 20 weeks on the chart.

== In popular culture ==
On May 18, 2010, "A Girl Like You" was made available as downloadable content for the Rock Band video game series.

== Formats and track listing ==
All songs written by Pat DiNizio, except where noted.

UK 7" single (ENV 15)

1. "A Girl Like You" – 4:38
2. "Cut Flowers" (Jim Babjak, Pat DiNizio) – 2:56

UK 12" single (12ENV 15)

1. "A Girl Like You" – 4:38
2. "Someone in Love" – 3:54
3. "Cut Flowers" (Jim Babjak, Pat DiNizio) – 2:56

== Charts ==
Chart (1989)	Peak position
US Billboard Hot 100	38
US Mainstream Rock (Billboard)	2
US Alternative Airplay (Billboard)	3
Charts (1990)	Peak position
Canada Top Singles (RPM)	62
