= Behind the Wall of Sleep (The Smithereens song) =

Single by The Smithereens

from the album Especially for You
- B-side: "White Castle Blues"
- Released: July 1986
- Recorded: The Record Plant, New York City
- Genre: Power pop, alternative rock
- Length: 3:04
- Label: Enigma
- Songwriter: Pat DiNizio
- Producer: Don Dixon

The Smithereens singles chronology
"Blood and Roses" (1986)	"Behind the Wall of Sleep" (1986)	"In a Lonely Place" (1986)

"Behind the Wall of Sleep" is a song by the American alternative rock group The Smithereens, released in 1986. It is the second single released in support of their debut album Especially for You.

== Background ==
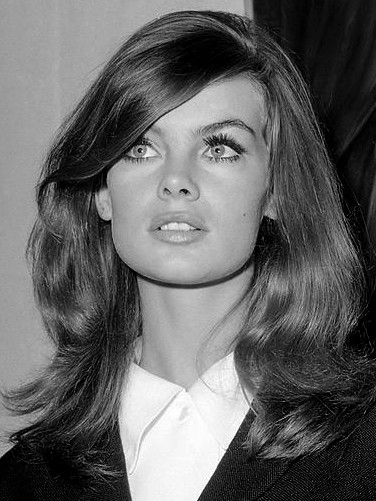
Jean Shrimpton in 1965

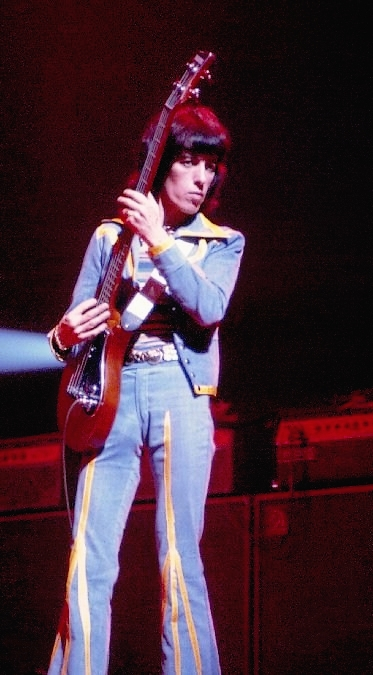
Bill Wyman in 1975

Lead singer Pat DiNizio wrote the lyrics to the song on the back of a cocktail napkin on a flight home from Boston to New York City. The Smithereens had shared a bill with the Boston band The Bristols, whose bassist Kim Ernst had caught DiNizio's attention. DiNizio: "My crush on her led me to write that on a very hung-over morning after a party in Boston." The lyrics include references to 1960s model Jean Shrimpton ("She had hair like Jeannie Shrimpton back in 1965") and Rolling Stone bassist Bill Wyman ("She held a bass guitar and she was playing in a band/And she stood just like Bill Wyman/Now I am her biggest fan"). At the time, DiNizio didn't give a lot of thought to the pop imagery in the lyrics, but it "seemed to create a certain interest later on", he said in 1995. The melody came to DiNizio at the same time: "I'm singing the thing to myself for the whole flight, like a mantra, so I don't forget it. Then I get stuck in traffic for two hours and I'm nearly losing my mind, because I knew I had a good song."

== Release ==
"Behind the Wall of Sleep" was released as the second single from the band's debut album, Especially for You. The track reached number 23 on the US Mainstream Rock Charts, as well as number eight on the UK Indie Charts.

The song was also featured on the compilation Left of the Dial: Dispatches from the '80s Underground.

== Formats and track listing ==
All songs written by Pat DiNizio, except where noted.

US 7" single (B-75002)

1. "Behind the Wall of Sleep" – 3:04
2. "Blood and Roses" – 3:35

US 12" promo single (EPRO-14)

1. "Behind the Wall of Sleep" – 3:04
2. "Behind the Wall of Sleep" – 3:04

UK 7" single (Enig 2)

1. "Behind the Wall of Sleep" – 3:04
2. "White Castle Blues" (Jim Babjak, Dennis Diken, DiNizio, Mike Mesaros) – 3:59

UK 12" single (Enig 2T)

1. "Behind the Wall of Sleep" – 3:04
2. "White Castle Blues" (Babjak, Diken, DiNizio, Mesaros) – 3:59
3. "Behind the Wall of Sleep (live)" – 3:26

German 7" single (INT 113.721)

1. "Behind the Wall of Sleep" – 3:22
2. "Blood and Roses" – 3:35

German 12" single (INT 128.721)

1. "Behind the Wall of Sleep" – 3:22
2. "Blood and Roses (live)" – 5:13
3. "White Castle Blues" (Babjak, Diken, DiNizio, Mesaros) – 3:57

== Accolades ==
Publication	Country	Accolade	Year	Rank
Colin Larkin	United Kingdom	The All-Time Top 100 Singles	2000	90
Bruce Pollock	United States	The 7,500 Most Important Songs of 1944–2000	2005	*

(*) designates unordered lists.

== Charts ==
Chart (1986)	Peak position
US Mainstream Rock (Billboard)	23

Chart (1987)	Peak position
UK Indie Chart	8

== Personnel ==
The Smithereens

- Jim Babjak – guitar
- Dennis Diken – drums, percussion, backing vocals
- Pat DiNizio – vocals, guitar
- Mike Mesaros – bass guitar, backing vocals

Additional musicians

- Joe Kernich – piano
