= Blood and Roses (song) =

Single by The Smithereens

from the album Especially for You
- B-side: "Behind the Wall of Sleep"
- Released: 1986
- Recorded: The Record Plant, New York City
- Genre: Alternative rock
- Length: 3:35
- Label: Enigma
- Songwriter(s): Pat DiNizio
- Producer(s): Don Dixon

The Smithereens singles chronology
"Blood and Roses" (1986)	"Behind the Wall of Sleep" (1986)

"Blood and Roses" is a song by the American alternative rock group The Smithereens. It is the first single released in support of their debut album Especially for You.

== Background ==
DiNizio explained of the song's origin, "I was walking home from my job as soundman at NYC's legendary Folk City nightclub through the freezing rain at about four in the morning when the bass line came to me, the chords and melody came later built around the bass part." Lyrically, the song is about a girl DiNizio knew in highschool, who took her own life. The title was taken from a short story of the same name by the Japanese writer Yukio Mishima, a literary hero of DiNizio's. "I found out years later that Blood and Roses was also the title of an obscure early 1960s horror film directed by Roger Vadim", DiNizio said.

== Release ==
"Blood and Roses" was released as the first single from the band's debut album, Especially for You. The single reached number 14 on the US Mainstream Rock Charts as well as number 99 in Australia. The song was released with a music video that features clips of the band interspersed with clips from the 1986 film Dangerously Close.

== Formats and track listing ==
All songs written by Pat DiNizio, except where noted.

US 7" single (B-75002)

1. "Blood and Roses" – 3:35
2. "Behind the Wall of Sleep" – 3:04

European 12" single (2139-7)

1. "Blood and Roses" – 3:35
2. "Mr. Eliminator" (Dick Dale) – 2:00
3. "Beauty and Sadness" – 3:47

== Accolades ==
Publication	Country	Accolade	Year	Rank
The Village Voice	United States	Singles of the Year	1986	13
Bruce Pollock	United States	The 7,500 Most Important Songs of 1944-2000	2005	*
WOXY.com	United States	Modern Rock 500 Songs of All Time	2009	299

(*) designates unordered lists.

== Charts ==
Chart (1986/87)	Peak position
Australia (Kent Music Report)	99
US Mainstream Rock (Billboard)	14
