= Cultural depictions of Elvis Presley =

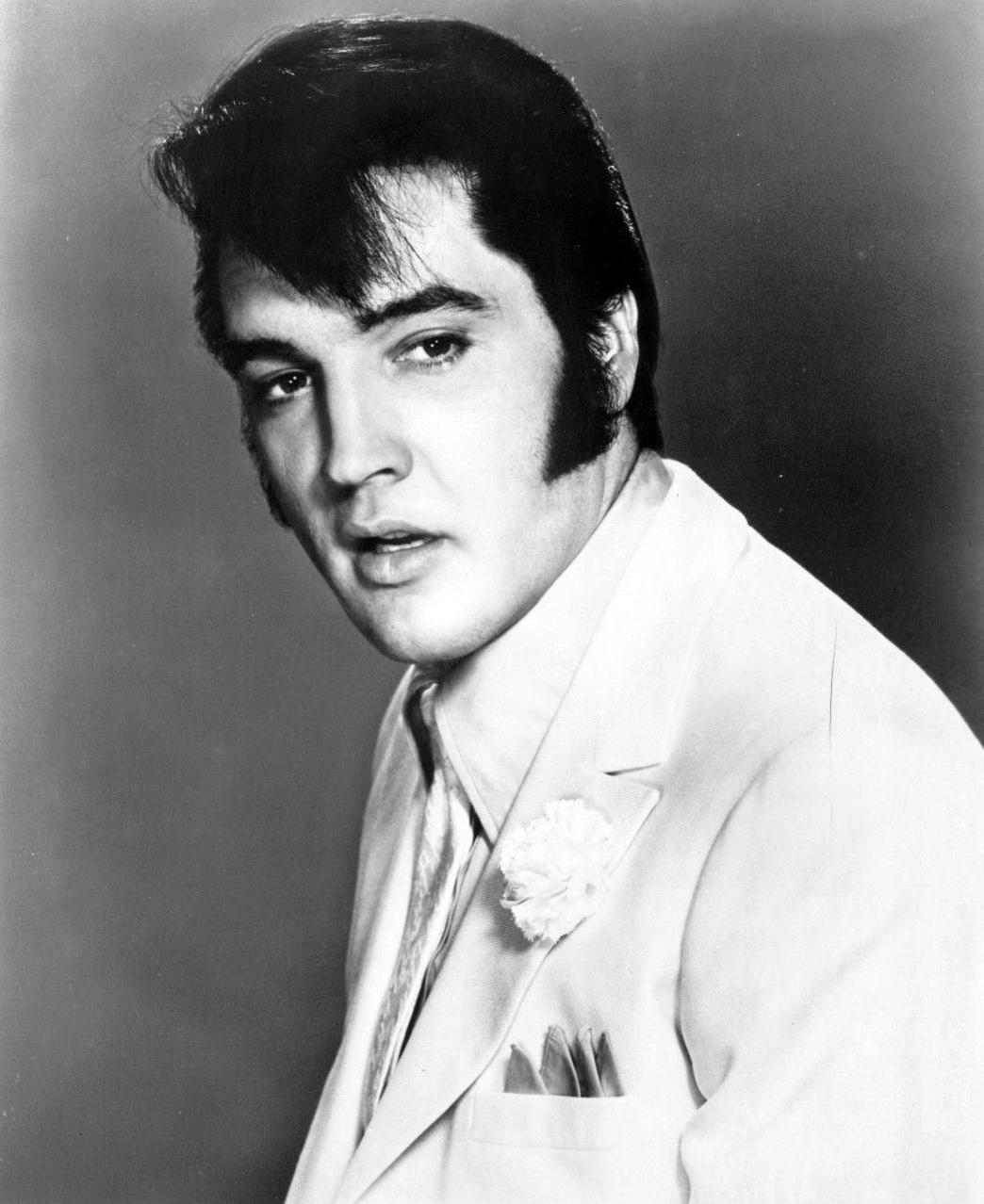
Elvis Presley in 1968

Elvis Presley has inspired artistic and cultural works since he entered the national consciousness. From that point, interest in his personal and public life has never stopped. Some scholars have studied many aspects of his profound cultural influence. Billboard historian Joel Whitburn declared Presley the "#1 act of the Rock era".

The following lists cover various media which include items of historic interest, enduring works of high art, and recent representations in popular culture. Only people and works with Wikipedia articles are included.

For purposes of classification, popular culture music is a separate section from operas and oratorios. Television covers live action series, TV movies, miniseries, and North American animation but not Japanese anime, which appears with manga and graphic novels.

== Portrayals ==
Actors' last names in alphabetical order

Actor	Credited character	Title (year of release; medium)
Lloyd Ahlquist	Elvis Presley	"Michael Jackson vs. Elvis Presley," Epic Rap Battles of History (Season 2, 2012)
Alexander Bayles	Elvis Presley, (adolescent age 13)	Elvis Evolution, London show (2025)
Paul Boensch III	Elvis Presley, child at age 10	This Is Elvis (1981)
Austin Butler	Elvis	Elvis (2022)
Bruce Campbell	Elvis Presley (fictional)	Bubba Ho-Tep (2002)
Rob Delaney	Elvis Presley	Rocketman (2019; deleted scene)
Dick Dale	Elvis Presley	Let's Make Love (1960)
Peter Dobson	i) young Elvis Presley (fictional) ii) The King	i) Forrest Gump (1994) ii) Protecting the King (2007)
Ral Donner	Elvis Presley, narration	This is Elvis (1981)
Jacob Elordi	Elvis Presley	Priscilla (2023)
Randy Gray	Elvis Presley as a boy	Elvis (1979)
Johnny Harra	Elvis Presley, age 42	This Is Elvis (1981)
Tyler Hilton	young Elvis Presley	Walk the Line (2006)
Paul Hipp	Elvis Presley	Liberace: Behind the Music (1988; TV film)
Chaydon Jay	Young Elvis	Elvis (2022)
Don Johnson	Elvis Presley	Elvis and the Beauty Queen (1981; TV film)
Stephen Jones	Elvis ghost segment (fictional)	Mystery Train (1989)
Harvey Keitel	Elvis Presley (fictional)	Finding Graceland (1998)
David Keith	Elvis Presley (fictional)	Heartbreak Hotel (1988)
Val Kilmer	Mentor	True Romance (1993)
Shawn Klush	Elvis Presley (fictional)	"The King and I," Vinyl (Season 1, 2016)
Ron Livingston	Elvis Presley (fictional)	Shangri-La Suite (2016)
Reiley McClendon	Elvis Presley (fictional)	Shangri-La Suite (2016)
Dana MacKay	Elvis Age 35	This Is Elvis (1981)
Gil McKinney	Elvis Presley (fictional)	Elvis Has Left the Building (2004; direct-to-video)
Dale Midkiff	Elvis Presley	Elvis and Me (1988; TV film)
Kevin Milanese	Elvis Presley	Relic Hunter (1999, episode "Thank You Very Much")
Drake Milligan	Elvis Presley	Sun Records (2017)
Chunkey Pandey	Elvis Presley (fictional)	Hello, Darling (2010)
Robert Patrick	Mr. Aaron (fictional)	Lonely Street (2008)
Steven Peri	Old Elvis (fictional)	Eerie, Indiana (1991)
Brady Permenter	Elvis	The Gift (2015)
Rick Peters	Elvis Presley	Elvis Meets Nixon (1997; TV film)
Jonathan Rhys-Meyers	Elvis Presley	Elvis: The Early Years (2005; miniseries)
Kurt Russell	i) Elvis Presley ii) Elvis Presley (fictional) (voice)	i) Elvis (1979; TV film) ii) Forrest Gump (1994)
David Scott	Elvis Presley, age 18	This Is Elvis (1981)
Michael Shannon	Elvis Presley, age 35	Elvis & Nixon (2016)
Jason Alan Smith	Elvis Presley	Crazy
Frank Stallone	Elvis Presley (fictional)	Angels with Angles (2005)
Ron Stein	Elvis Presley (fictional)	Death Becomes Her (1992)
Michael St. Gerard	i–ii) young Elvis Presley iii) young Elvis Presley (fictional)	i) Elvis (1990; mini-series) ii) Great Balls of Fire! (1989) iii) Heart of Dixie (1989)
George Thomas	Elvis Presley (fictional), as John Burrows	Memphis Rising: Elvis Returns (2011)
Jeff Yagher	Elvis Presley (fictional)	"The Once and Future King," The Twilight Zone (Season 2, 1986)
Rob Youngblood	Elvis Presley	Elvis and the Colonel: The Untold Story (1993; TV film)
Jack White	Elvis Presley (fictional)	Walk Hard (2007)

== Advertising branding and tourism ==
Elvis & Kresse, a company owned by Kresse Wesling and James (nicknamed Elvis at university) Henrit whose upcycling of industrial waste, mostly turning old fire hoses into new luxury products including bags and other carry-on accessories yield profits half of which are donated to various charities.

In 2018, the discount store Poundland changed the voice of its self-service checkouts to that of Elvis in all of its stores throughout the United Kingdom.

Other examples include Audi's 2001 Wackel-Elvis campaign, and State Farm's 2015 "Magic Jingle Elvis" commercial, directed by Roman Coppola

in 2023, a plan was announced by developers to construct a "Follow That Dream Park", a 228-lot RV resort on 30 acres off County Road 40. The land is north of the Withlacoochee River and west of U.S. 41 in the city of Dunnellon and will recall the movie that was filmed near the resort land as well as spots in Ocala and Citrus and Levy counties. In fact, West from the RV resort site the road is already known as Follow That Dream Parkway

== Art ==
Elvis-related artwork, or those based on known earlier works focusing on Elvis.

Artworks (excl. Andy Warhol)
Artist	Work	Location / exhibition	Description	Auction / worth ($USD)
Jef Aerosol	"Elvis"	Passage des Postes, Rue Blainville, Latin Quarter, Paris		
Craig Alan	"Elvis"	Whitewall Galleries (headquartered in High Wycombe, London)		
Robert Arneson	"Elvis"	National Portrait Gallery, Washington, D.C.	8-foot sculpture	
Tammam Azzam (Syrian cultural caravan)	"Elvis Warhol"			
Noah Becker	"Elvis" (2014)	Maltwood Art Museum and Gallery, Saanich, British Columbia	Oil-on-canvas (24 x 30 in)	
Bill Belew	untitled		Sketch of an Elvis jumpsuit	23 November 2013: Sold at Sotheby's for $35,000
Knowledge Bennett	"Elvis" (Cojones series)	Shown at SCOPE Art Show, NYC (March 2017). Currently hung at the home of Nile Niami.		Estimated worth of $17,500
Knowledge Bennett	"Obama Cowboy, Six-Shooter" (2012)		Repeat of several Elvis multiple imaginaries, by Warhol	
Ashley Bickerton	"The Bar"	Art Basel in Hong Kong	Its foreground, on jute, copies the seams in the pants worn by Elvis in the original color photo used by Andy Warhol in his Elvis series.	Sold for $290,000
Peter Blake	"Girls with their hero" (1959)	Currently at the Pallant House Gallery, Chichester, England		
Jorge M. Garcia (Argentinean artist)	"BMW 507 Elvis- Munchen y Graceland"			
G. Boersma	"Double Elvis- Painting of Woman Enjoying Portrait of Elvis Presley by Andy Warhol" (sold: 2018)	Originally located at Saatchi Art	Acrylic on masonite (8" x 8")	
Mr. Brainwash	Don't be cruel series			
Ryan Callahan	"Hans Solo Double"	Robert Fontaine Gallery, Miami, FL		
Enrique Chagoya	"Elvis meets the Virgin of Guadalupe"	Metropolitan Museum of Art		Property of philanthropist Arlene Schnitzer (1994)
City of Tupelo	"You may have a pink Cadillac, but don't you be nobody's fool"		Official Artwork for the 2019 anniversary Elvis Birthday Celebration	
Dan Colen	"Bob Marley, Jimmy Cliff & Elvis Presley"	First shown the Whitney Museum of American Art		2014 Sold at Christie's for $3.1m
George Condo	"Double Elvis"	First shown the Arsenale, Venice Biennale (7 May 2019)		
Ralph Wolfe Cowen	"Elvis"	National Portrait Gallery, Washington, D.C. (Its sister painting is currently at the Graceland Museum, Memphis, TN)		
Bonnie Daly	"Pablo Presley" (1994)	Museum of Bad Art, Dedham, MA	Acrylic-on-paper (19.5" x 11")	
Adam Devir	"Woman as Elvis"	National Botanic Gardens, Dublin	Acrylic-silkscreen-on-canvas (1.98 x 1.52 cm)	
Leah Devorah	"Elvis Presley"	ArcLight Hollywood (November 2017)		
Simon Dixon	"Elvis 56"	Art Republic	Prints (30 x 30)	
William Eggleston	untitled (1983; printed 1984)	Smithsonian American Art Museum (gift from Amy Loeserman Klein)	Depiction of Elvis and Priscilla	
Elisabetta Fantone	"Elvis"	Pangee Gallery, Montreal		
Howard Finster	"Elvis"		Enamel painting on board, depicting Elvis and his manager at the set of Love me Tender (11 x 12½ in.)	7 May 2018: Sold at a Material Culture auction in Philadelphia, PA, for $12,500.
Stefano Fioresi	"My interior: Double Elvis"	Istituto Italiano di Cultura, Stoccarda		
Autumn de Forest	"Elvis Warhol at age 9"	Park West Gallery (15 June 2013)		
Michael Friedel (German photographer)	"Elvis" (28 October 1956)			
Adrian Ghenie	"Elvis"			17 May 2018: Sold for $519,000 at Phillips.
Douglas Gordon	"Self Portrait of You + Me (Split Elvis)" (2015)			
Red Grooms	"Elvis"	National Portrait Gallery, Washington, D.C.		
Arthur Halucha	"Elvis"	DekoArt-Gallery		
Peter Halley	"Elvis"			12 November 2015: Sold at Sotheby's for $262,000
Keith Haring	"Elvis"			7 October 2017: Sold at Christie's for $121,000
Betty Harper	"Rock is born" (and other Elvis drawings in her collection)	Musicians Hall of Fame and Museum, Nashville, Tennessee (2013)		
Corinna Heumann	"Warhol Meets Lichtenstein (Elvis)" (2004)			
Gottfried Helnwein	"Boulevard of Broken dreams" (1985)	Philadelphia Art Museum (2017)		
Roberto Jimenez	"Eight Red Elvises" (2012)			
Deborah Kass	"Double Silver Yentl (My Elvis)" (1993)	Paul Kasmin Gallery, New York,		
Deborah Kass	"My Elvis" (1993)	Paul Kasmin Gallery, New York,		
Steve Kaufman	"Elvis"	Gallery Hotel Art, Florence, Italy (2017)		2017: Sold for $4,000 after it was shown at the Gallery Hotel Art
Jeff Koons	"Triple Elvis"			13 May 2015: Sold at Christie's for $8,565,000
Milorad Krstic	Radmila and Elvis	Lágymányosi Bridge, Budapest		
Marc Lacroix	"The White Hand of Salvador Dalí wearing the shirt Elvis gave him" (1971)	Property of Damien Leclere, Marseille, France		
Hal Mayforth	"Elvis has left the building"		Original acrylic on wood panel (12 x 16 in.)	Price met $1,300
Shannon Oksanen	"Blue Elvis" (2008)	Vancouver Art Gallery	Oil-on-linen (20 x 18 in.)	Est. $5,500
Dren Maliqui	"Face to Face"	The Gallery of Fine Arts – Gift Collection of Rajko Mamuzić, Novi Sad, Serbia (7 February 2008)		
Peter Mars	"Elvis"	William J. Clinton Presidential Library (first launch; 2011)	Exhibit	
Etta McFarland	"Heartbreak Hotel"	Barns of Rose Hill, Berrybill, VA (February 2019)	Quilt	
Ronnie McDowell	"Reflections of the King"	Published in connection with his TV series Ronnie McDowell Painting America.		
Ivan Messac	untitled		Silkscreen of Elvis	
Meddlesome Moth	"The Trinity"	Dallas, Texas	Drawings of Elvis, Chuck Berry and Jerry Lee Lewis in stained glass (12 x 4 ft), affixed as windows to the sky to one of the restaurant's diagonal ceilings	
David Nicholson	"Rushmore Elvis" (2016)		Photo of Elvis at Mount Rushmore, together with U.S. Presidents George Washington, Thomas Jefferson, Abraham Lincoln, and Theodore Roosevelt	
Natalie Nelson	"Elvis Presley's birthplace"	Drawn in connection with Time magazine's "Special Edition on the South of The United States" (publ. 6 August 2018.)	Illustration	
Steve Payne	"Elvis"		Dovetailing of George Dawe's "Russian general" portraits with Payne's "Replace a Face technique" (2018).	
George Dawe Guy Peellaert	"Elvis Presley's Last Supper"	Rock Dreams (1970-1973)		
Richard Pettibone	"Andy Warhol, Elvis, 1964"		13.3 x 13.3 cm	2006: Sold at Sotheby's London Office for $226,818.
Pietro Psaier	"Wounded" (1989)		Depiction of Elvis and Warhol	
Jonathan Ramirez	"Elvis"		Mural at 106 N. Pine St. in Inverness, FL	
Daniel Richter	"Elvis"			16 November 2006: Sold at Phillips for $419,200.
George Rodrigue	"You Ain't Nothin’ But a Blue Dog" (1996)	Neal Auction Company	24 x 36	
Ben Roe Jr.	"Elvis and the Birds"	South Broadway Cultural Center (31 August 2019)		
Mimmo Rotella	"Elvis Presley"			sold at Christie's on May 26, 2008, for US$157,000.
David Scheinmann	"Elvis/Marilyn"	21c Museum Hotel, Louisville, KY	Silkscreen	
David Scheinmann	"Elvis Playboy"			2018: Sold for $5,400.
Honoré Desmond Sharrer	"Leda & the Folks"	Currently alternating its location between: Smith College Museum of Art, Northampton, MA; and Pennsylvania Academy of the Fine Arts in Philadelphia, PA.	Painting focusing on Presley's parents	
Robert Silvers	untitled		Photomosaic of Elvis	
Mark Stutzman	Elvis US$0.29 stamp (1993; Legends of American Music series)		Airbrush and acrylic, requested by United States Postal Service.	
Roger G. Taylor	Elvis in Art (1987)	Elm Tree publications	Book of illustrations	
Lucrecia Torva	"Elvis"	Tempe Marketplace, Tempe, AZ	Mural (10 x 10 ft)	
Gavin Turk	"Elvis, Beige and Green"			4 December 2012: Sold at Sotheby's Paris for $56,000.
David Uhl	"Elvis in tune" (2007)	Currently at Graceland.		
Donald Urquhart	"Elvis"	Gallery of Modern Art, Glasgow		
Gary Varvel	"Aretha joins music royalty"	Indianapolis Star (18 August 2018)	Cartoon	
Geraldo Vitorio (Brazilian artist)	untitled	French Consulate, São Paulo, Brazil	Painting of Elvis and five other deceased music giants (David Bowie, John Lennon, Freddie Mercury, Jimi Hendrix, and Michael Jackson)	
Albert Wertheimer	"The Kiss"		Photograph (12 x 18 in.)	9 October 2009: Sold at Sotheby's to actress Diane Keaton for $4.063.
David Willardson	"Elvis I & II"	Rebecca Molayem Gallery, West Hollywood, CA		
Ronnie Wood	"Elvis I 1988"		Serigraph-on-paper (30 x 23 in.), handsigned at lower right	
Russel Young	"Elvis"			28 July 2016: Sold at Sotheby's for $11,875

=== Andy Warhol ===
The below table lists known silkscreens by Pop artist Andy Warhol featuring the image(s) of Elvis Presley and their current location, including art museums worldwide, as well as prices met and identified buyers and/or sellers. As of April 2020, prices paid (at either auctions houses or privately) for ten of the silkscreens below total US$344,000,000.

Silk screens by Andy Warhol
Work	Location(s) of original or copies	Paid price ($USD)	Note / Provenance
"Single Elvis" (1963)	The Broad Museum, Los Angeles, CA Similar original silkscreens, all from 1963, are located: Museum Ludwig, Cologne, Germany; National Gallery of Australia, Canberra, Australia; the Akron Art Museum, Akron, OH; The Andy Warhol Museum in Pittsburgh, PA; and; Art Institute of Chicago (Modern Wing), Chicago.	2004: $3,367,500. 2009: undetermined. 2020: $21.6 million	11 May 2004: A "Single Elvis" was sold at Christie's in NYC. 2009: Acquired for a price still undetermined by billionaire Eli Broad, founder and owner of The Broad Museum. 19 May 2020:"Single Elvis" sold in NYC
"Elvis X2" (1963–64)	1. Art Gallery of Ontario, Toronto; and 2. Pergamon Museum of Art, Berlin.		
"Double Elvis" (1963)	Another 21 original silkscreens similar to, or closely resembling the work are said to exist, including those located: 1. Seattle Art Museum, Seattle, WA (for which Warhol made a second, blank panel to be paired with the painting to emphasize absence and loss); 2. Guggenheim Museum Bilbao, Bilbao, ES (6 x 6.9 feet); 3. Kunsthalle Hamburg, Hamburg, DE; 4. Fukuoka Art Museum, JA; 5. "Ghost Elvis," the final and most opaque image in the series, as exhibited at the Halcyon Gallery, London (July 2012); and 6. The Future Perfect Gallery Los Angeles, since 2018 located inside a section of the home at 1174 N. Hillcrest Rd (since advertised as "Casa Perfect, Elvis Presley' Trousdale Estates home from 1967 to 1974").	2019: $25.46 million	March 2019: It was disclosed that the home had just been purchased by Harry Morton, son of one of its previous owners (Peter Morton) who was the co-founder of the Hard Rock Cafe chain.
"Double Elvis" (1963; 6.11 x 4.4 ft)	Museum of Modern Art, New York	1980s: $750,000	2001: Donated by the Jerry and Emily Spiegel Family Foundation to the New York Museum of Modern Art. It was previously owned by Albert Grossman and Bob Dylan.
"Double Elvis" (1963; 3.5 x 6.6 ft)	Another original, entitled "Elvis 2 times" (1963), can be found at the Whitney Museum of American Art, New York.	2012: $37,100,000 2018: $37,000,000	9 May 2012: Sold at New York's Sotheby's to billionaires Jose Mugrabi and then Steve Wynn, respectively. 17 May 2018: Sold by Wynn at Christie's in New York to British art dealer Brett Gorvy, co-owner of the Levy-Gorby Gallery in NY, London, and Geneva. He in turn confirmed his purchasing of the "Double Elvis" being actually done on behalf of one of his clients.
"Double Elvis [Ferus Type]" (1963; 4.3 x 6.8 ft)	Galerie Bruno Bischofberger, Zürich; Galleria Gian Enzo Sperone, Rome; Private collection in Turin; and then Dominique Lévy Gallery, Geneva.	2019: $53,000,000	15 May 2019: Sold at New York's Christie's for the highest price ever paid for a "Double Elvis". It was offered to Christie's, for its sale at auction by Mexican billionaire David Martínez.
"Elvis I and II" (1963; 13 x 6.82 ft)	Currently: Art Gallery of Ontario in Toronto	2017: $15,700,000	13 November 2007: Bought at Christie's.and currently located at the -
"Triple Elvis" (1964; 208.3 x 121.5 cm)		1998: $1,872,500	First in the "Triple Elvis" series whose price is known. The work heralds a trio of images so close together that they appear to be one. 19 November 1998: Sold at Christie's.
"Triple Elvis" (1963; 6.8 x 9.8 ft)	Four other very similar silkscreens, all from 1963, can be found at: 1. Virginia Museum of Fine Arts, Richmond, VA (original owners: philanthropists Frances & Sydney Lewis.; Mississippi Museum of Art, Jackson, MS (loaned until July 8, 2018); 2. Metropolitan Museum of Art, New York (two of the figures closely mixed, and a third, isolated).; 3. Milan's Italian Gallery (Luigi e Peppino Agrati Collection, May 2018; its three heads joined at the ears); 4. Saatchi Gallery, London (the three images so much apart from each other that the middle one only meets the other two at its feet).	2014: $81,900,000	13 November 2014: Purchased at Christie's by billionaires Doris and Donald Fisher, who lent it to the San Francisco Museum of Modern Art.
"Elvis Five"	The Andy Warhol Museum, Pittsburgh, PA.		
"Eight Elvises" (1963; 6.5 × 12 ft)		2008: $100,000,000 ($111,200,000 with fees	A one-of-a-kind large silkscreen. 26 October 2008: Sold privately by Italian art collector Annibale Berlingieri. It is thought to have been purchased by the House of Al Thani's Qatari Royal Family.
"Elvis Eleven Times" (1963)	Currently: The Andy Warhol Museum, Pittsburgh, PA		The largest Elvis by Warhol in existence, as well as being a unique piece.
"Campbell's Elvis" (1962)		2010: $1.450,000 2019: $2.850,000	Warhol's first painting in which he superimposed two images onto a single canvas. The painting was originally owned by Salvador Dalí and eventually sold after his death to Steve Wynn. 10 November 2010: First auctioned at Christie's. 20 March 2019: Sold at the 2019 Art Basel in Hong Kong.
"Gold(en) Boot (Slippers) Elvis Presley" (1957)	Currently: private collection of actor Tom Lacy		
"Red Elvis" (1962)		2000: $2.900,000	February 2000: Bought privately. It was later adjudicated, after a Connecticut Superior Court ruling, to its original owner, multi-millionaire art collector Peter Brant.
"Elvis 21 times" (1962)	1. Joseph K. Levene Fine Art, New York (on loan); 2. "The Creeks" in East Hampton, New York	1. 1993: undisclosed	1. 3 May 1993: Sold by the Andy Warhol Foundation at Sotheby's to Warhol collector and actress Jane Holzer.; 2. AGP Holdings, holding companies for Ronald O. Perelman, who as of 16 November 2022 is in dispute with insurers about whether a 2018 fire at "The Creeks" (Perelman's estate) damaged the work and reduced its value from a claimed $75 million.
"Elvis 49 times" (1964; 5 x 7 ft)	Hangs in the home of multi-millionaire Robert Mnuchin.	1980s: $75,000	Late 1975: Sold by Warhol to his friends Messrs Todd Brasser and Stuart Pivar, both of whom being art dealers. 1980s: Sold to art dealer Leo Castelli. The painting then was sold to millionaire art dealer Charles Saatchi, who more recently sold it to multi-millionaire Robert Mnuchin.
"Elvis Presley Rock Close Up" (1964)	Art NY Gallery.		

=== Cartoons ===
Cartoon illustrations of Elvis include:

- Bloom County, by Berkeley Breathed, in which Elvis is a character in the comic strip.
- Dark Future by Kim Newman, in which Elvis is a major character.
- Doonesbury by Garry Trudeau, in which a 1988 storyline featured Presley being found alive on Donald Trump's yacht.
- "Happy Times," a two-part series in Richie Rich/Jackie Jokers.
- Elvis at the Gates of Heaven, a filmed cartoon by Stan Lee.
- Bubba Ho-Tep x Army of Darkness I and II, a comic book series by Scott Duvall with art by Vincenzo Federici.
- Agent Elvis, an adult animated fictional series about the artist leading a double life as a spy and a singer (released by Netflix, 2023).

== Academia ==
- University of Iowa's "American Popular Arts, Elvis as Anthology", 1992 3-credit course, Iowa City, IA, USA
- Norwalk Community College's Elvis Presley and the American Dream, 1995 3-credit course, Norwalk, CT, USA
- University of Mississippi's International Six-day Conference on Elvis Presley, August 1995, Oxford, MS, USA
- Open University's Master of Arts in popular culture: Elvis Presley", 2005, Milton Keynes, UK
- Lakehead University's lectures on "Looking for Elvis", June 2009, Orillia, Ontario, Canada
- Arizona State University' Elvis- MUSIC 354, Summer of 2015, 3-credit course, Phoenix, AZ, USA
- University of Oviedo's "Elvis, a synthesis of an América in B&W" 2016, Oviedo, Gijón y Avilés campuses, Spain.
- University of Kent's Elvis Presley Seminar, June 3, 2017, Canterbury, UK
- Stonehill College's 2018 periodical Seminar on the death of Elvis Presley, Easton, MA
- University of Adelaide's MUSGEN 2001 - 2018 From Elvis to YouTube Seminar, Adelaide, Australia
- York University's "All thing Elvis" June 10, 2019 lecture, Toronto, Canada

== Events ==
The Memphis Summer Storm of 2003 was nicknamed "Hurricane Elvis"

=== Festivals ===
- Michigan ElvisFest, first held in 1989, then annually, in Riverside Park and Depot Town in Ypsilanti, Michigan
- Parkes Elvis Festival, first held in 1993, then annually since 2005 in Parkes, New South Wales, Australia
- Collingwood Elvis Festival, first held in 1995, then annually in Collingwood, Ontario, Canada
- Tupelo Elvis Festival, first held in 1998, yearly since. Tupelo, MS
- Mesquite, Nevada 's Elvis Rocks Mesquite competition, annually since 2009. Mesquite, NV, USA
- Penticton Elvis Festival, first in 2002, annually since 2010, Okanagan Valley, British Columbia, Canada
- Kobe Elvis Festival, annually since 2010 in Kobe, Japan
- Brunswick Elvis Festival, first held in 2011, then annually in Brunswick, Georgia, USA
- Niagara Falls Elvis Festival, first in 2017, then annually in Niagara Falls, New York, USA
- Nashville Elvis Festival, first held in 2017, then annually in Nashville, Tennessee, USA
- "Starring Louisiana", Krewe of Bacchus Parade, 2019, "King Creole" float, New Orleans, Louisiana, USA
- Virginia Elvis Festival, held in the month of September and annually at Lynchburg, VA, since 2019.
- The Illinois Elvis Festival, Collinsville, IL, July 17–19, 2025 ( since 2022). !

== Film ==
According to John Beyfuss, who reviews films for Memphis' Commercial Appeal since 1998, there has been since then an average of eighteen movies per year which carry some allusion to Elvis. There were an additional one hundred before 1998, which puts the number of such Elvis referencing in motion pictures, from numerous countries, at a minimum of four hundred since 1957, when the first such mention was made as part of the BBC-TV movie documentary A Night in the City. The list below is only a partial account and will be updated accordingly.

- A Brighter Summer Day: Sir and his friends send tapes to Elvis; film's title is from "Are You Lonesome Tonight?"
- Apes of Wrath: the expectant father's name is Elvis
- Bubba Ho-Tep
- Bye Bye Birdie: hysteria ensues when an Elvis-like singer is drafted into the US Army
- Chronicles of the King: The Search for Sasquatch', Elvis fakes his death and assembles a crew of Sasquatch hunters to hunt down Bigfoot (to be filmed in 2024)
- Cry-Baby
- God Is the Bigger Elvis, Oscar-nominated documentary about the life of Dolores Hart
- Elmo in Grouchland: Huxley points to a Velvet Elvis as one of his possessions
- Elvis
- Elvis & Nixon
- Elvis and the Beauty Queen
- Elvis Meets Nixon
- Elvis Has Left the Building
- Finding Graceland
- The Gift
- Happy Feet: Memphis is based on Presley's personality and vocals and is named after Memphis, Tennessee. Hugh Jackman, who provides the speaking and singing voice of the character, did his own Elvis impersonation for the soundtrack.
- Heartbreak Hotel: Elvis is kidnapped by a fan's son
- Honeymoon in Vegas: Jack is aided by a band of Elvis impersonators
- Hounddog: Lou gives Lewellen some Elvis records
- Idol on Parade about a British rock and roll star being drafted to the English Army.
- Independence Day: upon escaping the Mother Ship, Hiller declares "Elvis has left the building!" to which Levinson imitates Elvis saying, "Thank you, thank you very much."
- Looney Tunes: Back in Action: the song "Viva Las Vegas" plays upon arrival in Las Vegas.
- Lilo & Stitch franchise: Presley's songs and images are featured throughout, with title character Lilo Pelekai portrayed as a huge fan of Presley. Stitch also regularly impersonates Elvis in Lilo & Stitch: The Series and makes a few references to Presley in some Disney crossover video games.
  - Lilo & Stitch (2002): Lilo uses Presley as a role model for Stitch to follow in an attempt to tame him. During a sequence, Stitch plays ukulele to the guitar solo of "(You're the) Devil in Disguise" twice, the second time while impersonating Elvis. In a photo shown at the beginning of the closing credits, Lilo, Stitch, Nani, and David pose before Graceland.
  - Stitch! The Movie: "Slicin' Sand" is used as the film's opening song.
  - Lilo & Stitch 2: Stitch Has a Glitch: Lilo looks to Presley for inspiration to come up with an idea for her hula dance; she and Stitch go to several spots around Kauai where Presley supposedly visited, including a bench he supposedly sat on in Blue Hawaii.
  - Leroy & Stitch: Lilo gives Jumba an Elvis record as a parting gift; he uses Presley's cover of "Aloha ʻOe" on said record to program a fail-safe in Leroy that shuts him down upon hearing it.
  - Lilo & Stitch (2025): Presley's music (the same songs from the 2002 film) and likeness appears, and the Pelekais own a vinyl record of Blue Hawaii. The CGI version of Stitch impersonates Presley during the end credits, wearing the same costume as his traditionally-animated counterpart. Presley is not as prominent in this film as compared to the 2002 film, however.
- Man on the Moon: Jim Carrey's take on Andy Kaufman's Elvis impersonation.
- Men in Black: In the car, Agent K sings along to a cassette tape of Presley's version of the song 'Promised Land'. When Agent J sarcastically asks if he knows that Elvis is dead K responds, "No, Elvis is not dead, he just went home", implying Presley was in fact an alien visiting Earth.
- Mystery Train: Presley's ghost appears in a dream to Luisa; every room in the hotel has an Elvis portrait
- Oblivion: Jack has an Elvis bobble-head doll
- The Outsiders: the Greasers emulate Elvis
- Phir Bhi Dil Hai Hindustani: In the song "I Am the Best", Shah Rukh Khan dresses up as Elvis and does his iconic hip movement.
- Pulp Fiction: an Elvis impersonator performs at Jackrabbit Slim's
- RoboCop 2: Presley's skeletal remains with a picture of Elvis near it is seen by RoboCop at the sludge plant where the villain Cain and his Nuke Cult are hiding out.
- Rock-a-Doodle. The main character of Chanticleer resembles Elvis Presley and is also referred to as The King.
- Rocker 'Brella Fella Tim Vine starts as an Elvis Trinute artist.
- This is Spinal Tap: the band visits Graceland
- 3000 Miles to Graceland: a group plans a robbery in Las Vegas dressed as Elvis impersonators
- Touched by Love, also known as To Elvis, with Love
- Top Secret!: Nick performs "Are You Lonesome Tonight?"; film parodies Elvis's musicals
- Tropico: Elvis is shown in the Garden of Eden alongside Adam, Eve, Jesus, the Virgin Mary, John Wayne and Marilyn Monroe
- True Romance: Presley's ghost mentors Clarence
- Walk Hard: The Dewey Cox Story
- Wild at Heart: Sailor and Powermad perform "Love Me"
- Wired: John Belushi impersonates Elvis

== Internet ==
In the shared alternate history of Ill Bethisad (1997 and after), an analogue of Presley called "Elvis Pressler" appears. Just like the real-life Presley, his alternate universe counterpart Pressler was a famous Rock singer who was also an actor though there are also several notable differences between the two. First, Presley's identical twin brother, Jesse was stillborn, but Pressler's twin brother (also called Jesse) was born alive. Next, Pressler withdrew from public life in 1973 after he divorced his wife, Drusilla. While the real Elvis Presley was addicted to prescription drugs and had poor health during the mid-1970s, those were only rumors in the case of Pressler who spent most of 1973 to 1976 in his home helping doctors treat his twin Jesse for depression and alcoholism. Unlike Presley whose comeback happened in 1968 with a TV special, Pressler's comeback occurred in 1976 with the release of a new album Hope. Finally, both die on the same day (August 16, 1977) but Pressler dies in a more dignified manner (resembling how John Denver died in reality, though Denver, called both "Jean de Cournouaille" and "John Cornwall" and isn't an analogue, doesn't die that way in Ill Bethisad but is still alive and performing as of the mid-2000s) compared to the real-life Presley. Pressler, a few hours before a planned concert in Thunder Bay decides to fly on his personal autogyro (a much more common aircraft in Ill Bethisad then in reality) which he often did to relax, but while flying, the autogyro crashes and Pressler is killed. Neither his body or the craft were found until 1981. In the meantime, rumors and conspiracy theories circulated purporting to explain what really happened to Pressler.

== Literature ==
- Almost Famous (story by Cameron Crowe written in 1996, but only published in 2019)
- The Armageddon trilogy by Robert Rankin
- Biggest Elvis by P. F. Kluge
- Before Elvis by Preston Lauterbach
- Elvissey by Jack Womack (1993)
- Hitchhikers Guide to the Galaxy: Mostly Harmless
- The Kane Chronicles: Carter has to rob Presley's tomb to obtain an important clue
- King Clone by Ted Harrison
- Nightmares & Dreamscapes: "You Know They Got a Hell of a Band"
- The Odd Thomas series by Dean Koontz
- Southern Vampire Mysteries by Charlaine Harris
- Stardust by Nan Ryan, chronicles the life and exploits of an entertainer parallel to Elvis, while the "real" Elvis appears in the chapter of said entertainer's funeral
- Truth like the sun by Jim Lynch, 2012.
- Alternate Tyrants by Mike Resnick (1997)

== Science, technology and weather ==
- Elvis (text editor)
- Elvis operator, a type of conditional operator in programming
- Elvis, a code name for the Nokia Lumia 1020
- 17059 Elvis, an asteroid
- Elvis (helicopter)
- Elvis, 145-million-year-old pterosaur nicknamed as such, and now officially named Petrodactyle wellnhoferi in honor of Peter Wellnhofer
- Elvis Hurricane hitting Memphis, TN on July 22, 2003 and, crippling the city in just a matter of minutes.
- ELVIS, Acronym of the Extant Life Volumetric Imaging System, managed by the ISS at the Kennedy Space Center (FL),
- ELVIS 3, Acronym of the Expendable Launch Vehicle Integrated Support, a NASA contract designed to provide end-to-end launch services and engineering support for the Launch Services Program (LSP) at Kennedy Space Center in Florida and Vandenberg Air Force Base in California

== Popular culture ==
- "Elvis has left the building"
- Memphis Mafia
- Elvis sightings
- Elvis impersonator
  - Elvis Herselvis

== Musicals, plays and stage productions with a Presley-like character or important reference ==
- Are You Lonesome Tonight?
- All Shook Up
- All the King's women by Luigi Jannuzzi
- Asleep in the wind
- Aye, Elvis by Morna Young, Directed By Ken Alexander
- Beach Blanket Babylon
- Blood Suede Shoes
- Bye Bye Birdie: hysteria ensues when an Elvis-like singer is drafted into the Army
- Coming back like a song, a play about stopping Presley's reign in 1956 by Lee Kalcheim
- Confetti from Graceland
- Conjuring the King a Juggerknot Theatre Company on Elvis Florida Legacy
- Cooking with Elvis
- One degree from Elvis by Katie McGrath
- The Elvis Dead: a comic retelling of horror film Evil Dead II in the style of Elvis.
- Elvis a Musical Revolution, by David Venn Enterprises in partnership with Authentic Brands Group
- Elvis & Buddy, A Rock and Roll Sensation, musical to open in 2026 at the Wendouree Centre for the Performing Arts
- Elvis has left the building, a play by Jackie Hope.
- Elvis, My Way by Brandon Bennet at the Gretna Theatre, Philadelphia, PA
- Elvis sings "Old Shep", by Anne McKee
- Elvis the Musical" by Quin Gresham,
- Elvis Presley was a black man mamed Joe, by Jackie Taylor and her Black Ensemble Theater.
- Four Weddings and an Elvis by Nancy Frick.
- The Gospel Soul of Elvis by Mark Rios (traveling musical 2023)
- Graceland by Ellen Byron, directed by Tommy Wooten
- Grease: Main character's Elvis idiosyncrasies a main theme of the play.
- Happy Days
- Heartbreak Hotel by Floyd Mutrux
- Jailhouse Rock the London Musical by Rob Bettinson,
- Joseph and the Amazing Technicolor Dreamcoat: Pharaoh is acted in the style of Presley
- Million Dollar Quartet by Floyd Mutrux
- Negotiating Peace, a farcical play by Jeton Neziraj
- Nunsense II: Sister Mary Hubert impersonates Elvis
- Picasso at the Lapin Agile, Elvis one of three main characters
- Smokey Joe's Cafe: features the Elvis songs "Trouble" and "Treat Me Nice"
- Spaghetti from Graceland
- The Spy who love me tender, a musical comedy directed by Rina Vergarand opening in Aberdify, West Wales in 2026
- Tupelo Tornado ballet by Annabelle Lopez Ochoa
- When Elvis Met Che, play by Sol Biderman
- Elvis Radio
- Starlight Express: Greaseball the Diesel Engine was heavily inspired by Elvis.

== Television ==
=== Notable references ===
- ALF: "Suspicious Minds", ALF and Willie suspect their new neighbor is Elvis
- Boy Meets World: "Danger Boy", Elvis eats at Chubbie's and plays poker with Alan
- Celebrity Deathmatch: "Nick In A Coma", in a morpheme-induced dream, Nick dreams of a fight between Elvis and Jerry Garcia
- Civil Wars: "Pilot", an Elvis impersonator is served with divorce papers
- Coach: "Viva Las Ratings", Luther travels to Las Vegas, planning to "invest" his life's savings at an Elvis memorabilia auction
- Crossing Jordan: "Miracles & Wonders", Nigel thinks a dead Elvis impersonator may actually be Elvis
- CSI: Crime Scene Investigation: "Blood Moon", the team encounters an Elvis vampire
- DC's Legends of Tomorrow: "Amazing Grace", the Legends encounter Elvis after he comes into possession of the Death Totem
- Designing Women:
  - Charlene is an Elvis fan
  - "E.P. Phone Home", the ladies travel to Memphis for a tour of Graceland
  - "Shovel Off to Buffalo", Mary Jo's shovel has Presley's face impressed on it
- E Street: "Episode 385", Ernie and Sally are married by an Elvis impersonator
- Eerie, Indiana: Elvis walks of out his home to get the newspaper in several episodes
- Elvis TV series
- Elvis TV mini-series
- Family Matters: "Ain't Nothing but an Urkel", Steve accidentally transforms into Elvis via his Transformation Chamber
- Father Ted: "Competition Time"
- Fireman Sam: Fireman Elvis Cridlington is named after and inspired by Elvis
- Full House: Jesse is obsessed with Elvis, and once had a job as an Elvis impersonator
- Give My Head Peace: Uncle Andy is an Elvis fan
- Hannah Montana: Hannah's brother Jackson is a celebrity impersonator, most notably, Elvis and Ozzy Osbourne
- Horrible Histories: Tom Stourton plays Elvis Presley in Series 7
- The Golden Girls:
  - "The President's Coming! The President's Coming! Part 1", the ladies encounter an Elvis impersonator
  - "Sophia's Wedding: Part 1", Sophia is married before an audience of Elvis impersonators
- The Killing: "Unraveling", Holder references a Velvet Elvis
- Las Vegas: theme song is "A Little Less Conversation"
- The Last Precinct: King is an Elvis impersonator
- Married... with Children: "I'm Going to Sweatland", the Bundys are inundated with fans when a perspiration stain on Al's shirt resembles a silhouette of Elvis
- Miami Vice: Crockett owns an alligator named Elvis; Switeck is an Elvis fan
- The Miraculous Mellops: several episodes features Elvis impersonators
- The New WKRP in Cincinnati: "Long Live the King", Les's editorial denouncing a rival station's Elvis look-alike contest prompts a call from a man who claims to be Elvis
- Nightmares & Dreamscapes: "You Know They Got a Hell of a Band", Elvis is the Mayor of Oregon
- Nip/Tuck: "Joyce & Sharon Monroe", an Elvis impersonator wants to look more like Elvis
- Paradise (TV series): A Graceland tour guide takes refuge at Graceland in the Hulu series' first episode of its second season.
- Pizza: "Dangerous Pizza", a group of Elvis impersonators get into a fight with a group of Kiss impersonators
- Quantum Leap: "Memphis Melody - July 3, 1954", Sam leaps into Elvis
- Red Dwarf: "Meltdown", Elvis is part of a group of Heroes (including Pythagoras, Stan Laurel, Albert Einstein and Marilyn Monroe) that Rimmer and Kryten lead against the Villains faction
- Renegade: "The King and I", Reno thinks a stranger who helped him during a fight may be Elvis
- Saturday Night Live:
  - "Jackie Chan/Kid Rock", played by Karen Lynn Gorney
  - "Matthew Broderick/The Sugarcubes", played by Kevin Nealon
  - "John Madden/Jennifer Holliday", played by Andy Kaufman
  - "Shelley Duvall/Joan Armatrading", played by John Belushi
- 7th Heaven: "The Heart of the Matter", an anesthetized Eric thinks he's Elvis
- Shake, Rattle and Roll: An American Love Story
- The Simpsons:
  - "Viva Ned Flanders"
  - "Viva Los Simpsons" 2005 DVD episode collection, Homer apes Elvis on the cover
- Sledge Hammer: "All Shook Up", Hammer goes undercover as an Elvis impersonator to catch an Elvis impersonator killer
- Sliders: "Pilot", Quinn sees a billboard of an elderly Elvis in Las Vegas
- Spitting Image: Elvis parody "I'm Sure Livin' Since I Died"
- The Twilight Zone: "The Once and Future King"
- Vinyl: "The King and I", Finestra attempts to lure Elvis away from Colonel Tom Parker, and sign with American Century
- Walker, Texas Ranger: "Suspicious Minds", the daughter of an Elvis impersonator witnesses a murder
- The X-Files: "Never Again", Mulder travels to Graceland

=== Appearances and other programming ===
Stage Show, 6 episodes in 1956 filmed at CBS Studio 50 in New York City on January 28, February 4, 11, 18, March 17 and 24, for the so-called " Tommy and Jimmy Dorsey's show", a program produced by Jackie Gleason as a lead-in for his show. Each episode was watched by an estimated audience of 6 million viewers, averaging an 18.4% share. Jazz and pop musician Quincy Jones, then 23 years old and on a somewhat extended three-month visit to his family in New York, played second trumpet on all Presley's performances.

Texaco Star Theater, 2 episodes in 1956:

1. April 3 aboard the 24 Essex-class aircraft carrier USS Hancock in San Diego, CA.
2. June 5 from NBC studios Los Angeles, CA. Audience estimated to have been 18 and 22 million viewers respectively. Segments of the latter were shown in the 1994 blockbuster Forrest Gump.

Teenage Dance Party, June 16, 1956; hosted by Wink Martindale, WHBQ-TV Memphis, TN

Hy Gardner Calling, July 1, 1956 television interview, WRCA-TV, New York City, NY

The Steve Allen Show, July 1, 1956 from the NBC studio at The Hudson Theatre, in New York City. This show was watched by 40 million viewers representing a 20.2 rating and a 55.3% share, the highest in the history of the Steve Allen Show. Also, according to interviewers from Sidlinger & Company, it was the most talked about show in the preceding 52 weeks, with 38 million adults, or 31% of the US population acknowledging having discussed the show in the period from 1 to 7 July, the highest ever since the interviews were first launched.

The Ed Sullivan Show. 3 episodes. All three episodes were released in their entirety on DVD format on November 21, 2006, by Image Entertainment, selling 100,000 copies during its first year alone.

1. September 9, 1956, live feed from CBS Television City in Fairfax District, CA, garnering some 60.7 million viewers and a 57.1 rating, both records up to that time. The % share, an 82.6% and also a record, remains the largest ever garnered, by any network or group of networks, for any single program in the history of US television.
2. October 28, 1956 from CBS Studio 50, New York City, drawing a 34.6 rating with a 57% share and an estimated audience of 56.5 million and....
3. January 6, 1957, also from Studio 50, New York City, drawing a 47.4 share and reaching some 54.6 million viewers.

The Frank Sinatra Timex Show: Welcome Home Elvis : Taped March 26, 1960 at the Fontainebleau Hotel in Miami Beach, FL; it aired on ABC May 12, 1960. Nielsen reported a 41.5 rating and 67.7% share, with an audience at 50 million, the top-rated show of 1960 and of Frank Sinatra's 21-year television special career (1960–1981). It was released on DVD by Quantum Leap on February 10, 2004

Elvis (also known as the Elvis Comeback Special or the 68 Comeback Special). Taping in June 1968 was at NBC Studios in Burbank, CA; the air date being December 3. 1968. With a 47.8 share, the telecast garnered the highest ratings of any program in 1968, viewed by an estimated audience of 50 million. Released on VHS in 1986, RIAA Platinum; on DVD format in 2004, RIAA 4× Platinum; as DVD Special Edition in 2006, RIAA 2× Platinum. Presented by Ann-Margret.

Aloha from Hawaii Via Satellite was a Kui Lee Cancer Fund benefit concert at Honolulu's Neal S. Blaisdell Center, presented by Ann-Margret. It was broadcast by NBC worldwide, live on January 14, 1973, and in the US as a deferred telecast on April 4, 1973. Ratings for the US telecast were the highest of the week, reaching a 33.8 rating, a 57% share, as well as a viewership estimated at 50 million. Global viewership reached about a billion when shown live by Intelsat on January 14, 1973. It attracted 91.8 percent of viewers in the Philippines, 70-80 percent in both Hong Kong and South Korea, as well as almost 40 percent in Japan. It was first released on VHS in 1986, earning an RIAA Platinum award; on DVD in 2004, RIAA 4× Platinum; and as Special Edition DVD 2006, RIAA Platinum.

Elvis in Concert was his last concert tour, filmed two months before his death, then broadcast by CBS as a one-hour special after his death and airing on October 3, 1977. This posthumous presentation was the top-rated program of the week, with a 34.1 rating, reaching a little over 24.1 million households and an estimated audience of 50 million viewers.

Memories of Elvis was a three-hour special which aired on NBC on November 20, 1977, with Ann Margret as the hostess. It dovetailed both a 90-minute version of the 1968 TV special and the Aloha from Hawaii specials.

The Elvis Cover-Up was a special airing in 1979. According to Nielsen, it obtained a 43% share, equivalent to an estimated audience of over 50 million viewers, the second highest audience ever garnered for the 20/20 series, a popular news-magazine program on the ABC network.

One Night with You was an HBO Special airing on August 15, 1985. It was released by Light Year Video Entertainment on VHS on November 24, 1992, and on DVD on August 1, 2000.

Elvis and Me was an ABC TV two-part miniseries which aired on the nights of February 7 and 8, 1988. According to Nielsen it was the highest rated TV film of the 1987–88 season, seen by 32.4 and 31.4 million viewers, respectively.

Elvis: The Tribute was an ABC TV special, originally on pay-per-view and airing on October 8 of 1994 live from the Pyramid Arena in Memphis. It then aired on ABC in 1995, hosted by John Stamos and with the then Mr. and Mrs. Michael Jackson in the audience.

He Touched Me: The Gospel Music of Elvis Presley. Three-hour documentary airing on various channels in 1998 and 1999 and released in DVD by Coming Home Studios in 2000. RIAA Platinum and RIAA 2× Platinum, respectively.

Elvis Lives. NBC special made in conjunction with the release of ELV1S: 30 No. 1 Hits and airing on 28 November 2002.

Elvis by the Presleys. CBS special airing May 13, 2005, receiving an 8.1 rating and a 15% share and winning its time slot with an audience of 12 million viewers. Released on DVD in 2005, RIAA 2× Platinum.

Idol Gives Back. The Elvis and Celine Dion segment dueting on "If I Can Dream" was broadcast by Fox through rotoscoping on April 25, 2007. It drew a 24% share and an audience of 26.4 million viewers while raising US$79 million in donations by year's end. It was also the top show of the week and the top rated "Idol Gives Back" in its three-year history (2007–2010).

Elvis Presley: The Searcher. An HBO special airing on 14 April 2018, whose parts 1 and 2 reached close to 900,000 viewers. Released on DVD format by Sony Legacy on April 6, 2018.

1968 Special's 50th anniversary (All Star Tribute). Elvis and 19 other performers (Blake Shelton, Shawn Mendes, Keith Urban, Post Malone, John Fogerty, Ed Sheeran, Kelsea Ballerini, Jennifer Lopez, Darius Rucker, Alessia Cara, Mac Davis, John Legend, Little Big Town, Adam Lambert, Pistol Annies, Carrie Underwood, Yolanda Adams, Dierks Bentley, and Josh Groban). Aired February 17, 2019. Filmed October 2018 at NBC Studios in Los Angeles, CA. The telecast earned one of the top five highest ratings for any program in its time slot (Sunday, 8–10 pm ET, a 3% share with an audience estimated by Nielsen at 6.3 million viewers)

Christmas at Graceland. An NBC one-hour live remembrance from Graceland featuring the singing of Lainey Wilson, Lana Del Rey, Kane Brown, Alanis Morissette, Post Malone, The War and Treaty, John Legend + the Memphis Choir and Kacey Musgraves, as well as appearances by Dolly Parton, Jennifer Hudson, Jon Bon Jovi and Cher, as presented by Presley's oldest granddaughter, actress Riley Keough. It won its slot for the night of November 23, 2023, scoring the second highest rating of the week for network and cable, and drawing nearly 5 million viewers via the following: 3.03/9 (#1) Viewers: 4.92 million (#1), Adults 18-49: 0.52/6 (#1), Adults 18-34: 0.24/5 (#1), Adults 25-54: 0.77/6 (#1).

CBS Presents an Oprah Special: Elvis, Lisa Marie and Riley, one-hour interview of Riley Keough by Oprah Winfrey, filmed at Graceland and later broadcast on CBS on October 8, 2024. It reached an audience of 3.78m.

Return of the King: The Fall and Rise of Elvis Presley. 2024 Netflix documentary film focusing on his triumphant '68 comeback special.

== Sports ==
- T O Elvis, Kentucky-bred racehorse owned by Tomoya Ozasa, winner of the 1026 Churchill Downs Stakes
- King Elvis the First, mascot of the Kenosha Kingfish, a baseball team playing at a collegiate summer baseball league in the state of Wisconsin
- Kid Galahad, name taken from an Elvis film by world champion boxer Kid Galahad
- Las Vegas Raiders: Giant murals by Michael Godard of Elvis wearing a # 20 football jersey with the name Presley, and of Marilyn Monroe as a cheerleader recently unveiled inside Las Vegas' new Allegiant Stadium
- Sunderland A.F.C'S club song being Can't Help Falling in Love
- Memphis 901 FC: Crown logo dedicated to Elvis and BB King.
- New England Patriots: Flying Elvis logo
- The Honky Tonk Man: American professional wrestler who wore jumpsuits similar to Presley's in-ring, while also styled with slicked-back black hair and sideburns. He also carried a guitar to the ring.

== Stamps and coins ==
- U.S. Postal Service, US$0.29 stamp. Dedicated on January 8, 1993, the actual image chosen from 60 entries was that of a watercolor airbrush and acrylic on board portrait of a young Elvis, as presented by artist Mark Stutzman. Some 517 million were printed and sold, with 124.1 million of them saved, and thus making it the most popular commemorative stamp, as well as the largest earner, a profit of US$32.5 million, to have ever been issued by the USPS as noted by the Washington Post.
- U.S. Postal Service, US$0.49 Elvis Presley Forever stamp. Dedicated on August 12, 2015, making Elvis Presley, the only US national, other than Martin Luther King Jr. and several US Presidents, who has been the subject of two commemorative stamps since the USPS's founding in 1971. The image chosen was a 1955 photograph of Elvis by William Speer, with complementary work by designers Antonio Alcalá and Leslie Badani
- There are 69 countries and territories, from Albania to Zaire, which have used Presley's image for their commemorative stamps.
- Gibraltar has issued four Elvis commemorative Gold coins for the 2023 year, one worth a Crown, two worth half a crown each and the fourth worth 1/10 of a crown.

== Video games ==
- Bill & Ted's Excellent Video Game Adventure: Elvis is one of sixteen "historical dudes" who can be rescued.
- Civilization I, Civilization II, and Civilization III: In the city screen the citizens assigned as entertainers depicted as Elvis Presley.
- Civilization II: The "Attitude" Advisor in the player's "High Council", who advises on the peoples' happiness, is an Elvis Presley caricature, wearing sunglasses even in the Ancient period.
- Fallout: New Vegas: The Kings are a gang of tribals who come across an Elvis Impersonator school in New Vegas. Although they impersonate Presley and know his songs, they don't know his real name as none of the material they found at the school used it (the game is set two centuries after a nuclear war and as a result, knowledge of Presley was lost until they found the school). They instead refer to him as "The King".
- Fisher-Price Sing-Alongs: Barnyard Rhythm & Moos: A pig dressed as Elvis performs the song "Barn House Rock" as "Elvis Pigsley."
- The Legend of Zelda: Wind Waker: A dancer named Tott with a striking resemblance to Elvis Presley appears on Windfall Island.
- Leisure Suit Larry III: Passionate Patti in Pursuit of the Pulsating Pectorals: Elvis Presley may randomly appear at the bar in Patti's piano lounge.
- Lollipop Chainsaw: the final boss, Killabilly, is a giant zombie inspired by Elvis, with one of its attacks being him throwing pink cadillacs against the player.
- Perfect Dark: The Extraterrestrial Maian Diplomat, known as Protector1, adopts the name Elvis as he becomes enamored with terrestrial culture, going as far to own a pair of blue suede shoes during the climax of the game.
- Theme Hospital: In later levels, patients arrive at the hospital suffering from "King Complex". Symptoms included the patient dressing up like Elvis, wearing a white/grey jacket with a red music note at its back, matching trousers, sunglasses and Presley's famous hairdo. It was cured by visiting a psychologist, who would tell the patient how ridiculous he/she looked.
- Transformice: Presley's hair appears in the shop.
- Wayne's World: Presley appears as a level boss.

== Other eponymous uses including recreations of Graceland ==
- Elvis (comic strip), a Swedish comic strip
- Elvis Rock, in Ceredigion, Wales
- Debby Ryan's cat (Elvis)
- Graceland: The King’s Pub, owned by Joy Noseworthy and located in Newfoundland and Labrador
- The Elvis House, at 2807 Lasker Avenue, Waco, Texas. a boarding house owned by LaNelle Fadal
- Memphis Mansion, located in Randers, Denmark
- Loudermilk Boarding House and Elvis Museum GA,
- Just Pretend Mansion, Beechgrove, Tennessee
- Orlando, Florida Graceland Replica built in 1981

=== Fictional characters ===
- Elvis Cridlington, a firefighter in Fireman Sam
- Elvis "EJ" DiMera, a character on the American soap opera Days of Our Lives
- Elvis, a character in Perfect Dark
- Elvis, a character in God Hand
- Elvis, a host of The Dog House
- Elvis, a fictional alligator in Miami Vice
- Elvis, a guide dog in Growing Up Fisher
- Elvis, a police dog in Petersburg, Virginia
- Alvis Parsley in Pajama Sam 3: You Are What You Eat from Your Head to Your Feet, mentioned but not shown

== See also ==
- Cultural impact of Elvis Presley
- Elvis Presley
- Elvis Presley on film and television
- List of halls of fame inducting Elvis Presley
