= Philippe Ségalot =

French art dealer

- Born: France
- Education: HEC Paris
- Occupation: Art dealer
- Known for: High-profile art transactions; co-founder of GPS Partners

Philippe Ségalot is a French art dealer active in the international contemporary art market. He began his career at Christie's, where he worked from 1996 to 2001, and later established himself as a private dealer. Ségalot has been involved in several notable art transactions, including sales of works by Barbara Kruger, Yves Klein and Andy Warhol.

== Career ==
After studying at HEC Paris, Ségalot worked for Christie's from 1996–2001. During that period, he became the first to put contemporary furniture by designers such as Marc Newson into fine art auctions. In 2000, he enlisted three art students from Bard College to install one of his sales at Christie's.

In 2002 Ségalot left Christie's and began working privately, operating GPS Partners alongside Franck Giraud and Lionel Pissarro, in New York and Paris. At the sale of Marion Lambert's collection at Phillips, de Pury & Company in 2004, he purchased Barbara Kruger's I Shop Therefore I Am. (1983) for $601,600, a record for the artist's work at auction. In 2008, he secured Yves Klein's MG9 (1962) and IKB1 (1960) from the collection of German industrialist Walther Lauffs for $35.1 million and $26 million, respectively. Also in 2008, he negotiated the private sale of Andy Warhol's Eight Elvises (1963) from the collection of Annibale Berlingieri for $149.5 million.

After Giraud left the partnership in 2011, Ségalot and Pissarro continued to operate together from 2012 on. In 2015, Ségalot joined forces with French furniture dealer François Laffanour on acquiring a collection of about 30 pieces of Shaker furniture which they sold at TEFAF. Later that year, he bought Christopher Wool's Untitled (1990) for $23.1 million.

== Recognition ==
In 2014, The Guardian named Ségalot in their "Movers and makers: the most powerful people in the art world".
