= Henrit =

Henrit is a surname. Notable people with the surname include:

- Bob Henrit (born 1944), English drummer
- James Henrit, the "Elvis" of company Elvis and Kresse

== See also ==
- Henri
