= Hologram concert =

Musical event using projected images

A hologram concert is a musical event featuring hologram or Pepper's ghost forms of performers. Many of them tend to be of artists who are deceased. They often feature dead or absent pop stars. Examples include ABBA Voyage, In Dreams: Roy Orbison in Concert, An Evening with Whitney: The Whitney Houston Hologram Tour, and Elvis Evolution. One of the first performances of this kind was of Gorillaz at the 48th Grammy Awards in 2006.

== See also ==
- Virtual concert
