= Dean Vegas =

Australian Elvis tribute artist and politician

- Vegas in April 2012

Background information
- Born: Australia
- Occupations: Entertainer, singer
- Years active: 1995 to present

Dean Vegas is an Elvis tribute artist and politician. He has performed around the world as Elvis. He has been referred to as the top Elvis Presley impersonator in Australia.

== Background ==
Vegas is the most prominent Elvis impersonator in Australia. In 2000 he was crowned the no 1 Elvis tribute artist in the world. In the past he has performed at the New Zealand version of the Parkes Elvis Festival. He has also performed in Elvis Presley's birthplace Tupelo. As a mayoral candidate, he has run for the position three times. The first was in 2004 and the second in 2008.

When Vegas was a boy, aged around 12 he saw Elvis Presley on television which made an impression on him. On his 16th birthday, he got a box set of Reader's Digest cassettes that contained some Elvis songs which he loved. While at school, Vegas got the part of Conrad Birdie in the school play production musical Bye Bye Birdie. This was Vegas's first time on stage playing a role. In the play, he sang "Rubberneckin'".

== Career ==
He started his Elvis tribute career around 1995. Along the way, he has performed with The Jordanaires, who had provided backup on Presley's recordings. He has performed in the United States, in Memphis and Las Vegas. In the East and Asia, he has performed in Dubai, Lebanon, and China. Other countries and places include New Zealand, Sweden, Canada, London, and Norfolk Island.

=== 2000 - 2010 ===
In July 2006, Vegas was appearing at the Collingwood Elvis Festival in Canada. He was now a favorite at the festival since being grand champion in 2000. In 2007, Vegas was invited to play in Tupelo, the place where Elvis was born. While there, the Mayor handed him the key to the city. While there he received a guitar as a gift from the hardware store where Presley got his first one. After that he performed with the Sweet Inspirations, the female group that provided backing vocals for Presley during the 1970s. On 16 August 2007, which was the 30th anniversary of Presley's death, Vegas was interviewed by Paula Kruger for The World Today program on ABC Radio. Among the other questions asked, he was asked what he thought about Lisa Marie's vocals being added to the original recording of "In the Ghetto", which was to be released to mark the 30th year following Presley's passing. His answer was that he thought the idea was great and that she should have done it years ago.

=== 2010 onwards ===
In January 2011, he appeared at the Elvis Festival in Parkes, New South Wales. October 2011 was Vegas's first time performing in Norfolk Island. He played at the Paradise Hotel there accompanied by two local dancing girls. Later that week he was set to perform at the Leagues Club there backed by islander Trent Christian and his band. The speculation by the reporter Jemima was correct about the visit to the island not being his last, Vegas was back there in 2015 as part of the Legends of Rock, which featured Vegas as Elvis, Dennis Knight as Johnny O'Keefe and Chris Knight as Buddy Holly. 2012 saw Vegas, who is a fan favorite, back at the Collingwood Elvis Festival. At that time had been coming on various occasions for about ten years. Around September 2013, Vegas was on stage at the Logan Entertainment Centre for the 2013 Logan Mayoress' Annual Gala Dinner and Show Fundraiser, hosted by Logan Mayor, Pam Parker. The event which attracted 480 guests raised $70,000. In early 2014, he appeared at the Australia's international tattoo festival, SURFn'ink. He played a show at 6 pm which was followed by rocker Angry Anderson. Clive Palmer hired Vegas in June 2014 to entertain guests at Coolum Resort in Queensland's Sunshine Coast. In July 2014, Vegas was on Norfolk Island, hosting the Norfolk Island Rock'n'Roll Festival which ran from the 19th to the 26th of that month. In September 2014, at the Victor Harbor Rock 'n' Roll Festival, Vegas was the feature performer for that year. The event, which is held in South Australia runs from the 20th to the 21st of that month. In June 2015, along with Dennis Knight, and Kris Knight, he headlined the Elvis and Friends show. From 19 June 2015 – 21 June 2015, they appeared at the Hopgood Theatre, Chaffey Theatre, and Sir Robert Helpmann Theatre in South Australia. In early 2016, he was part of the Ultimate Vegas Show in Adelaide.

== Marriage celebrant ==
In 2013, he performed a marriage ceremony for Toowoomba couple Kartekka and Jay Stathamoliver. In 2014, Vegas appeared on the Seven Network program, Sunrise, hosted by David Koch and Samantha Armytage. Having entered and won a competition by Queensland's Breeze FM, Dianne Crooks and her husband Bill were part of a ceremony with other couples to be married by Vegas. The event was covered by Channel 7 as well as a follow up on the 14th of July, which featured Dianne and Vegas. Also in early 2016, The Pharmacy Guild of Australia were looking for pharmacy couples to get married by Vegas at the March APP 2016 conference.

== Discography ==
Film list
Title	Label	Year	Notes
Tribute to Elvis	Blue Pie	2001	
Rappin' with the King		2001	
Get Down n` Dirty	Blue Pie		

== Film ==
Film list
Title	Role	Director	Year	Notes
George of the Jungle 2	Elvis impersonator	David Grossman	2003	
Rockin around the 50s, Wintersun 2007	Himself	Robert Bale	2007	recorded live from Wintersun 2007
Enter the Hamster	Elvis impersonator	Paul Vorrasi	2011	

== Politics ==
In November 2011, he was running for mayor of Queensland's Gold Coast. Joe Esposito, the former manager of Elvis Presley said that the Gold Coast needed an Elvis as its mayor. He was one of seven candidates in running for the March 2012 election.

In the past, he has endorsed mining magnate and politician Clive Palmer.
