= Neo-pop =

Postmodern art movement of the 1980s and 1990s

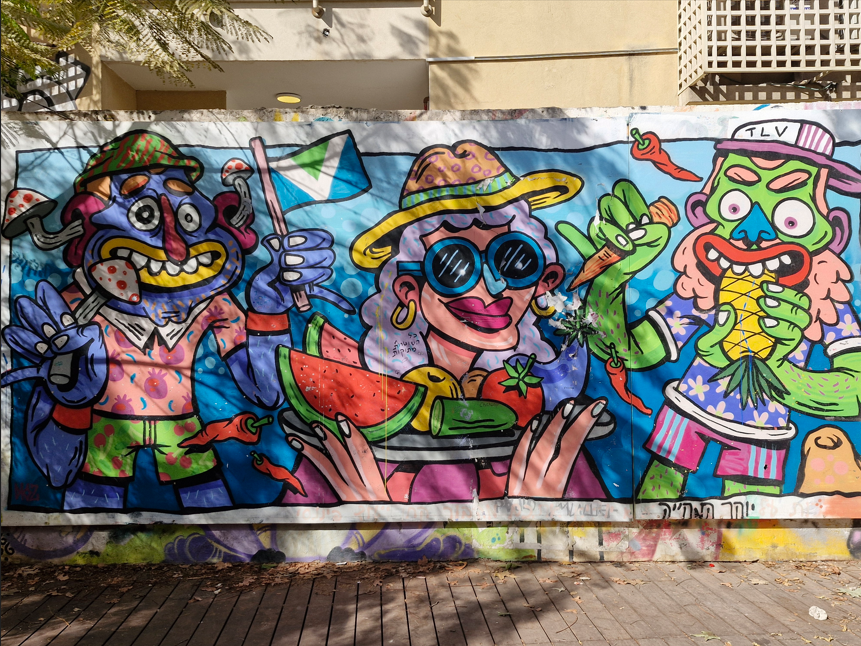
A blend of Neo-pop and cartoon in Tel Aviv street art.

Neo-pop (also known as new pop) is a postmodern art movement that surged in the 1980s and 1990s. It is a resurgent, evolved, and modern version of the ideas of pop art artists from the 50s, capturing some of its commercial ideas and kitsch aspects. However, unlike in pop art, Neo-pop takes inspiration from a wider amount of sources and techniques.

== Context ==
Neo-pop art's visuals don't retain many aspects of traditional pop art but rather convey its ideas into modern times. Neo-pop takes elements from pop art like its emphasis on popular culture, consumerism, and mass media and its bright color palette. The visuals are mainly rooted in vibrant colors, diverse patterns (like polka dots, flowers, hearts, stars, lines, etc.), and a mix of imagery from everyday life, like advertisements and pop culture. Neo-pop artists often took inspiration from celebrities, cartoons, and iconic trademarks to make their artworks. Defined as a resurgence of the aesthetics and ideas from the mid-20th century movement capturing the characteristics of pop art like intentional kitsch and interest in commercialism.

== Notable artists ==
The term (which was originated in 1992 by Japanese critic Noi Sawaragi) refers to artists influenced by pop art and popular culture imagery, such as Jeff Koons, Romero Britto, Damien Hirst and Peter Mars, but also artists working in graffiti and cartoon art, such as Keith Haring and Kenny Scharf.

Japanese artist Takashi Murakami is described as the first of the Japanese neo-pop artists to "break the ice in terms of recycling Japanese pop culture". Japanese neo-pop known as Superflat is associated with the otaku subculture and the obsessive interests in anime, manga and other forms of pop culture. Artist Kenji Yanobe exemplifies this approach to art and fandom.

== See also ==
- Camp (style)
- Vaporwave
- Superflat
- Lowbrow
- Dada
