= Eight Elvises =

1963 painting by Andy Warhol

- Artist: Andy Warhol
- Year: 1963
- Type: Silkscreen on canvas
- Dimensions: 200 cm × 370 cm (6.5 ft × 12 ft)
- Location: Private collection

Eight Elvises is a 1963 silkscreen painting by American pop artist Andy Warhol of Elvis Presley. In 2008, it was sold by Annibale Berlingieri for $100 million to a private buyer, which at the time was the most valuable work by Andy Warhol. The current owner and location of the painting, which has not been seen publicly since the 1960s, are unknown.

== Background ==
Eight Elvises is composed of eight identical, overlapping images of Elvis Presley in cowboy attire, silkscreened over a silver background. The painting was originally a portion of a 37-foot long (11 m) piece, containing sixteen copies of Elvis, that was showcased in a 1963 exhibition at the Ferus Gallery in Los Angeles. The exhibition, Warhol's second at the Ferus, contained several other pieces using the same image of Elvis, as well as a series of head shots of Elizabeth Taylor. The images of Elvis were taken from a publicity still from the movie Flaming Star. When the gallery was dismantled, the section with eight images of Elvis became a distinct piece, measuring 6 1/2 by 12 feet (200 by 370 cm). While Warhol created 22 versions of the painting with two Elvises on it, known as Double Elvis, only one piece titled Eight Elvises was created.

== 2008 sale ==
In 2008, Eight Elvises was sold by Annibale Berlingieri, who had owned it for 40 years, in a private sale for $100 million to an unidentified collector. News of the sale, which was not announced publicly at the time, was broken by art writer Sarah Thornton and published in The Economist in late 2009. The deal was brokered by Philippe Ségalot, a New York–based art dealer and one time head of the contemporary art department at Christie's auction house. The sale made Eight Elvises one of the most expensive paintings ever sold, and made Warhol only the fifth artist, behind Pablo Picasso, Gustav Klimt, Jackson Pollock, and Willem de Kooning to have a painting sold for at least $100 million. The current location of the painting is unknown.

Another painting from 1963, Silver Car Crash (Double Disaster), broke the valuation record for a Warhol work set by Eight Elvises when it sold for $105.4 million at auction in November 2013.

== See also ==
- Triple Elvis
- List of most expensive paintings
- List of all known Warhol Elvis silkscreens, their current location, as well as prices met, when known
