= Cultural impact of Elvis Presley =

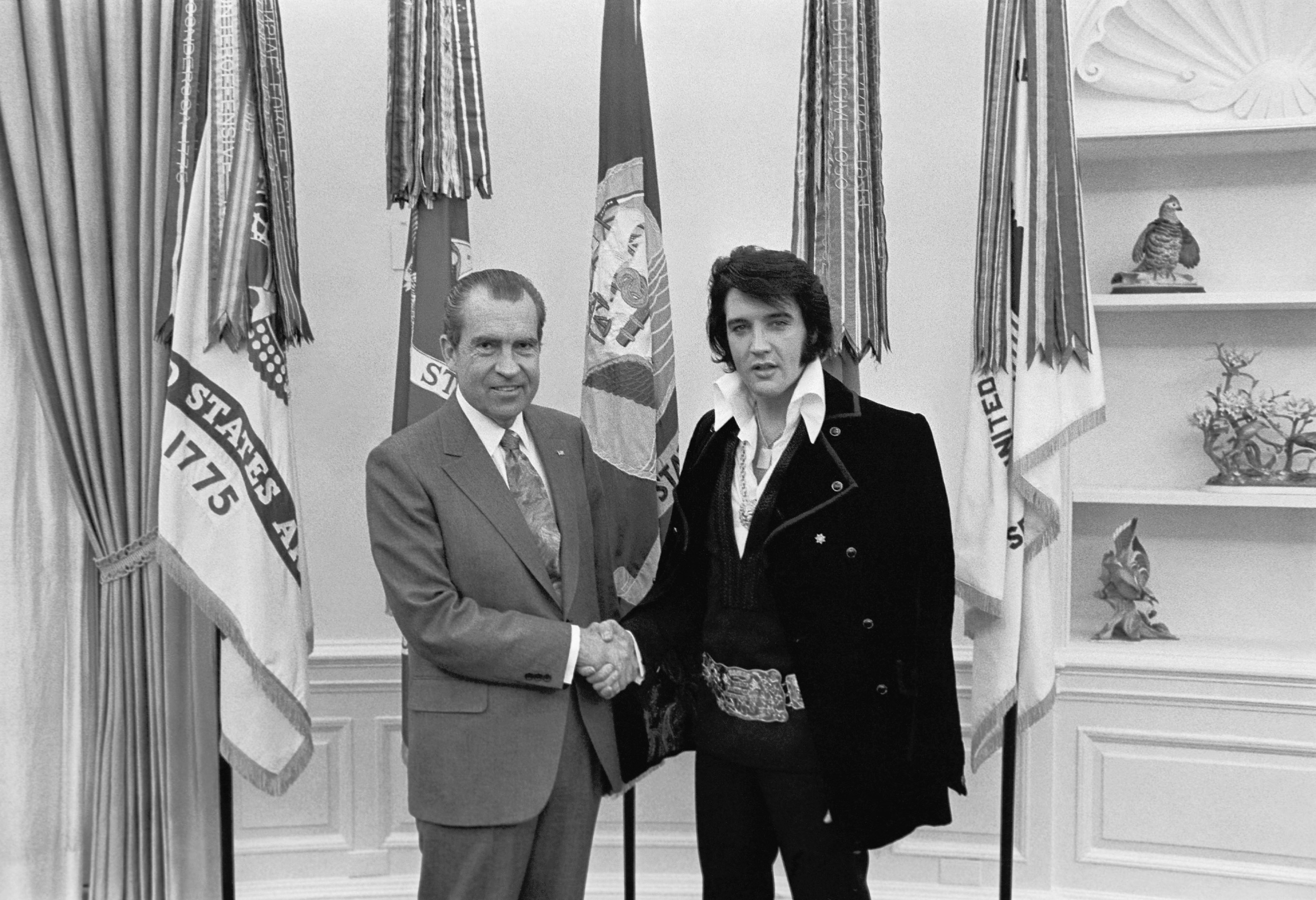
Elvis Presley with President Richard Nixon at the White House on December 21, 1970

The cultural impact of Elvis Presley was a seismic and defining phenomenon of the 20th century. As a musician and entertainer, Presley's influence extended far beyond music, shaping popular culture in the realms of fashion, youth identity, sexuality, and media. The Rolling Stone Encyclopedia of Rock & Roll describes Presley as "an American music giant of the 20th century who single-handedly changed the course of music and culture in the mid-1950s". His synthesis of diverse musical genres (particularly African-American blues, Christian gospel, and Southern country) combined with an uninhibited performance style, challenged the social and racial barriers of his time and galvanized a new youth-oriented consumer culture. In a list of the greatest English language singers, as compiled by Q magazine, Presley was ranked first, and second in the list of greatest singers of the 20th century by BBC Radio.

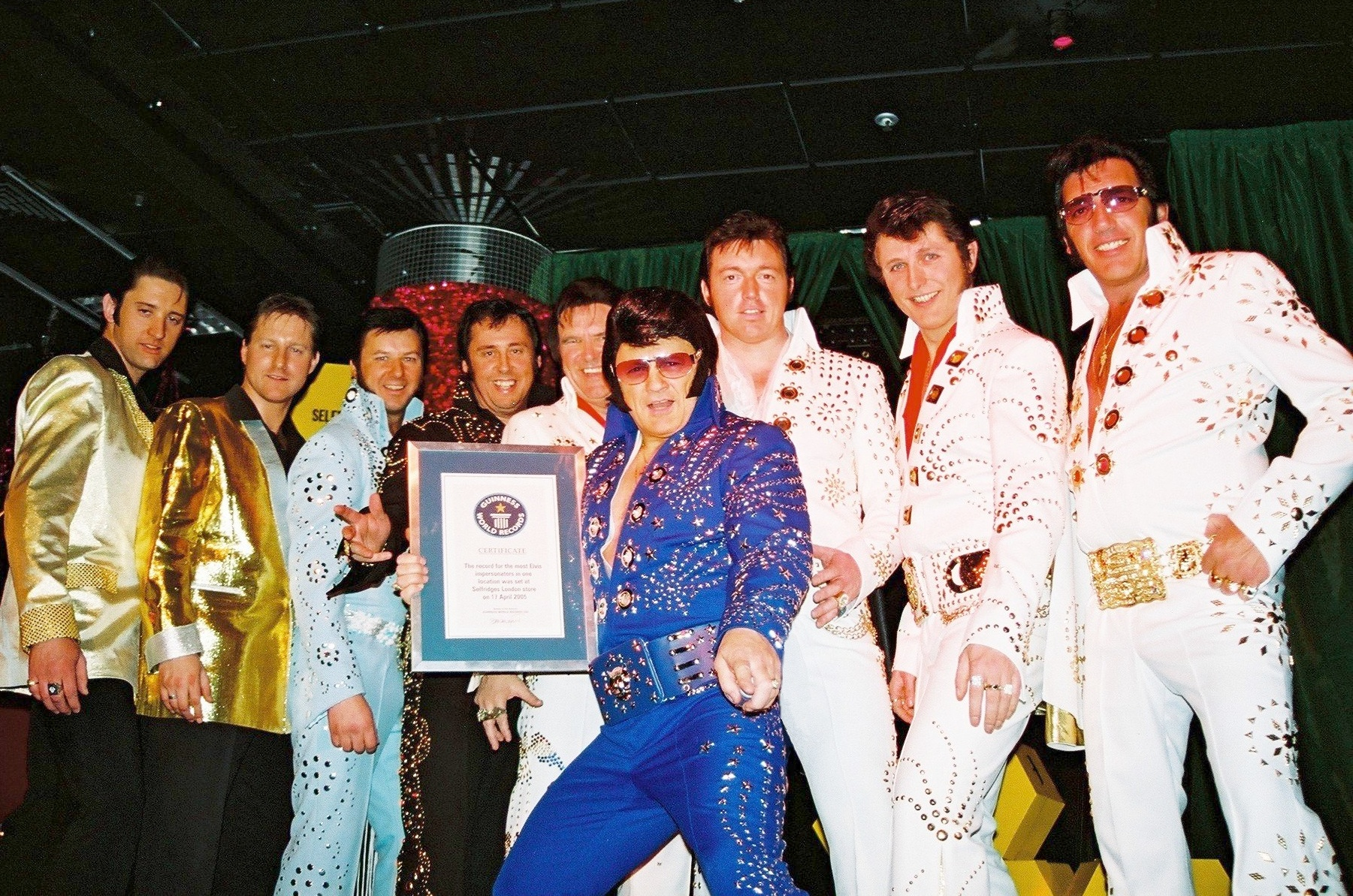
Elvis impersonators

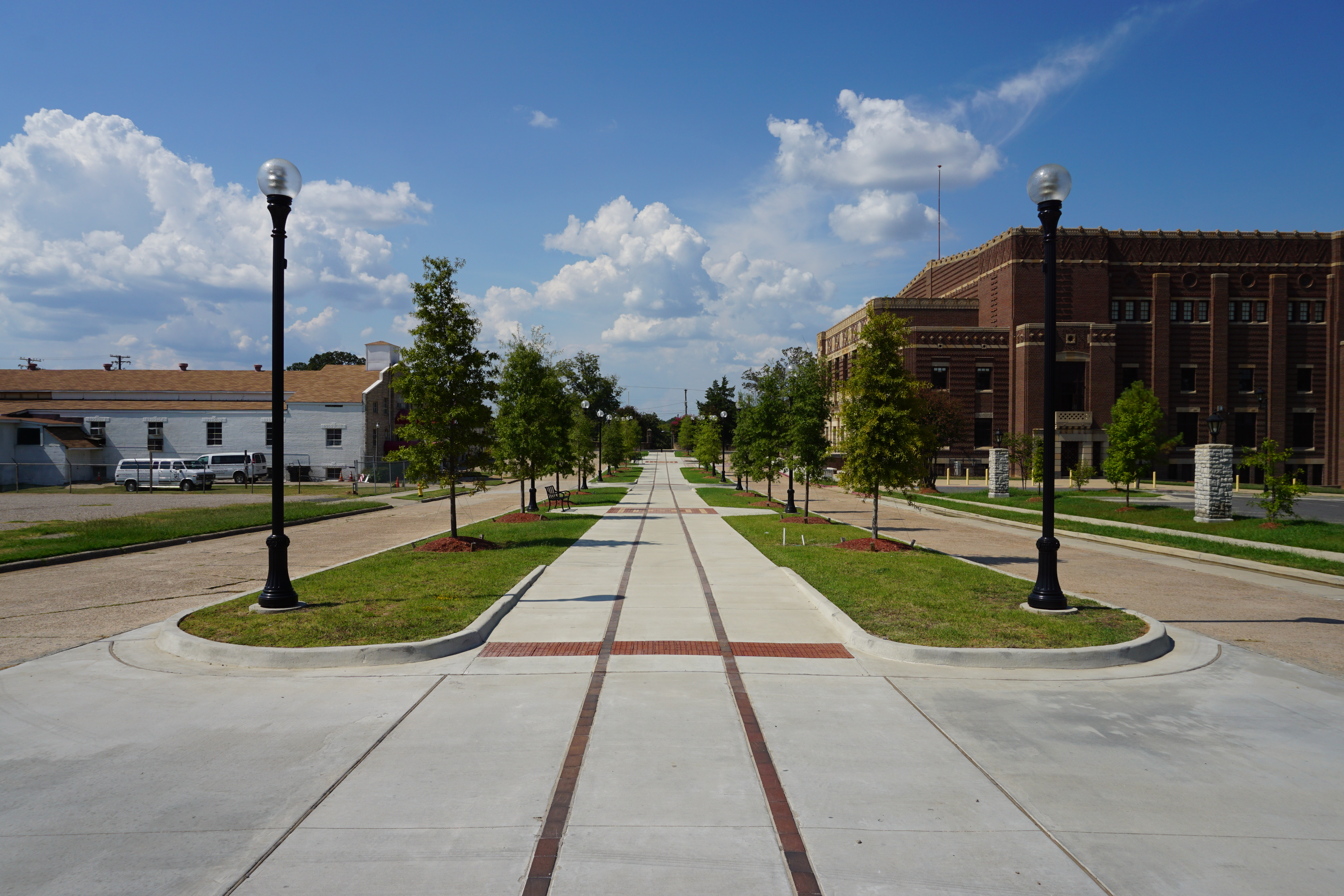
Elvis Presley Avenue in Shreveport, Louisiana

Presley sang hard-driving rock and roll, rockabilly dance songs, and ballads, laying a commercial foundation upon which other rock musicians would build their careers. African-American performers such as Big Joe Turner, Wynonie Harris and Fats Domino came to national prominence after Presley's acceptance among mass audiences of white American adults. Singers like Jerry Lee Lewis, the Everly Brothers, Chuck Berry, Bo Diddley, Little Richard, Buddy Holly, Johnny Cash, Roy Orbison, and others immediately followed in his wake. John Lennon commented the day after the Beatles visited the singer at his home: "The only person that we wanted to meet in the United States of America was Elvis Presley. You can't imagine what a thrill that was last night. Nothing really affected me until I heard Elvis. If there hadn't been an Elvis, there wouldn't have been the Beatles."

Presley’s image evolved from the rebellious rocker of the 1950s to the Las Vegas showman of the 1970s, making him a highly recognizable figure in modern history. His style directly influenced the youth. Along with Presley's "ducktail" haircut, the demand for black slacks and loose, open-necked shirts resulted in new lines of clothing for teenage boys.

Presley's impact on the American youth consumer market was noted on the front page of The Wall Street Journal for December 31, 1956, when business journalist Louis M. Kohlmeier wrote, "Elvis Presley today is a business", and reported on the singer's record and merchandise sales. Half a century later, University of Auckland historian Ian Brailsford commented, "The phenomenal success of Elvis Presley in 1956 convinced many doubters of the financial opportunities existing in the youth market."

== African American music influence ==
=== Debt to African American music, impact on black artists ===
Despite that Nat King Cole had the #7 song in 1959, and the #1 song in 1961, and that Chuck Berry had a major hit with "Maybellene" in 1955, the 1950s United States was fraught with legal segregation and discrimination against African Americans, especially in the Deep South. Presley would nevertheless publicly cite his debt to African American music, pointing to artists such as B. B. King, Arthur "Big Boy" Crudup, Ivory Joe Hunter, and Fats Domino. The reporter who conducted Presley's first interview in New York City in 1956 noted that he named blues singers who "obviously meant a lot to him. [He] was very surprised to hear him talk about the black performers down there and about how he tried to carry on their music." Later that year in Charlotte, North Carolina, Presley was quoted as saying: "The colored folks been singing it and playing it just like I'm doin' now, man, for more years than I know. They played it like that in their shanties and in their juke joints and nobody paid it no mind 'til I goosed it up. I got it from them. Down in Tupelo, Mississippi, I used to hear old Arthur Crudup bang his box the way I do now and I said if I ever got to a place I could feel all old Arthur felt, I'd be a music man like nobody ever saw." Little Richard said of Presley: "He was an integrator. Elvis was a blessing. They wouldn't let black music through. He opened the door for black music." B. B. King said he began to respect Presley after he did Arthur "Big Boy" Crudup material and that after he met him, he thought the singer really was something else and was someone whose music was growing all the time right up to his death.

Up to the mid-1950s, black artists had sold minuscule amounts of their recorded music relative to the national market potential. Black songwriters had mostly limited horizons and could only eke out a living. But after Presley purchased the music of Otis Blackwell, an African-American singer-songwriter, and had his "Gladys Music" company hire talented black songwriter Claude Demetrius, the industry underwent a dramatic change. In the spring of 1957, Presley invited African American performer Ivory Joe Hunter to visit Graceland and the two spent the day together, singing "I Almost Lost My Mind" and other songs. Of Presley, Hunter commented, "He showed me every courtesy, and I think he's one of the greatest."

=== Distrust of Elvis, transgression of societal boundaries ===
"Racists attacked rock and roll because of the mingling of black and white people it implied and achieved, and because of what they saw as black music's power to corrupt through vulgar and animalistic rhythms. ... The popularity of Elvis Presley was similarly founded on his transgressive position with respect to racial and sexual boundaries. ... White cover versions of hits by black musicians ... often outsold the originals; it seems that many Americans wanted black music without the black people in it," and Elvis had undoubtedly "derived his style from the Negro rhythm-and-blues performers of the late 1940s."

Sam Phillips had anticipated problems promoting Presley's Sun singles. He recalled, "The white disc-jockeys wouldn't touch... Negroes' music and the Negro disc-jockeys didn't want anything to do with a record made by a white man." Phillips felt that Dewey Phillips—a white DJ who did play 'black' music—would promote the new material, but many of the hundreds of listeners who contacted the station when "That's All Right" was played were sure Presley must be black. The singer was interviewed several times on air by the DJ and was pointedly asked which school he had attended, to convince listeners that he was white.

Hillbilly singer Mississippi Slim, one of Presley's heroes, was one of the singer's fiercest critics.

In 1957, Presley had to defend himself from claims of being a racist; he was alleged to have said, "The only thing Negro people can do for me is to buy my records and shine my shoes." The singer always denied saying, or ever wanting to say, such a racist remark. Jet magazine, run by and for African-Americans, subsequently investigated the story and found no basis to the claim. However, the Jet journalist did find plenty of testimony to conclude that to Elvis, "people are people regardless of race, color or creed".

Certain elements in American society have dismissed Presley as no more than a racist Southerner who stole black music. The "Elvis stole black music" theme is an enduring one with arguments for and against published in books. A southern background combined with a performing style largely associated with African Americans had led to "bitter criticism by those who feel he stole a good thing", as Tan magazine surmised. By 2000, some would consider Elvis "a symbol of all that was oppressive to the black experience in the Western Hemisphere".

In his scholarly work Race, Rock, and Elvis, Tennessee State University professor Michael T. Bertrand examined the relationship between popular culture and social change in America and these allegations against Presley. Professor Bertrand postulated that Presley's rock and roll music brought an unprecedented access to African American culture that challenged the 1950s segregated generation to reassess ingrained segregationist stereotypes. The American Historical Review wrote that the author "convincingly argues that the black-and-white character of the sound, as well as Presley's own persona, helped to relax the rigid color line and thereby fed the fires of the civil rights movement."

Whether or not it was justified, the fact remains that distrust of Presley was common amongst the general African-American population after the accusations of racism were made public. Presley's singles had consistently charted on Billboard's R&B Singles Chart during the 1950s, but during the early 1960s, this became less common; his final chart appearance on Billboard's R&B chart was in 1963. According to George Plasketes, several songs by other performers came out after the singer's death, which are part of a "demystification process as they portray Elvis as a racist." In his book, Colored White: Transcending the Racial Past, David Roediger considers contemporary "wiggers" in light of the tensions in racial impersonation embodied by Elvis Presley. Chuck D and others have at one point or another publicly condemned Presley for "stealing" black music. However, in 2002, Chuck D, in an interview with the Associated Press in connection with the 25th Anniversary of Presley's death, explained how his feelings for Elvis's legacy were no longer those as originally suggested by the lyrics in "Fight The Power", a song which he had written 12 years earlier. When broadcast as a part of the NBC-produced documentary "Elvis Lives", Chuck D had the following to say about Presley: "Elvis was a brilliant artist. As a musicologist—and I consider myself one—there was always a great deal of respect for Elvis, especially during his Sun sessions. As a black person, we all knew that. (In fact), Eminem is the new Elvis because, number one, he had the respect for black music that Elvis had."

== Danger to American culture ==
By the spring of 1956, Presley was fast becoming a national phenomenon and teenagers came to his concerts in unprecedented numbers. There were many riots at his early concerts. Scotty Moore recalled: "He'd start out, 'You ain't nothin' but a Hound Dog', and they'd just go to pieces. They'd always react the same way. There'd be a riot every time." Bob Neal wrote: "It was almost frightening, the reaction... from teenage boys. So many of them, through some sort of jealousy, would practically hate him." In Lubbock, Texas, a teenage gang fire-bombed Presley's car. Some performers became resentful (or resigned to the fact) that Presley going on stage before them would "kill" their own act; he thus rose quickly to top billing. At the two concerts he performed at the 1956 Mississippi-Alabama Fair and Dairy Show, one hundred National Guardsmen were on hand to prevent crowd trouble.

=== Perceived moral and sexual impact ===
Presley was considered by some to be a threat to the moral well-being of young women, because "Elvis Presley didn't just represent a new type of music; he represented sexual liberation." Presley generated an "anti-parent outlook" and was the "personification of evil" and, to many adults, the singer was "the first rock symbol of teenage rebellion... they did not like him, and condemned him as depraved. In 1956, a critic for the New York Daily News wrote that popular music "has reached its lowest depths in the 'grunt and groin' antics of one Elvis Presley" and the Jesuits denounced him in their weekly magazine, America. Time magazine of June 11, 1956, mockingly referred to the singer as "dreamboat Groaner Elvis ('Presley')." Even Frank Sinatra opined: "His kind of music is deplorable, a rancid smelling aphrodisiac. It fosters almost totally negative and destructive reactions in young people."

Presley was even seen as a "definite danger to the security of the United States." His actions and motions were called "a strip-tease with clothes on" or "sexual self-gratification on stage". They were compared with "masturbation or riding a microphone". Some saw the singer as a sexual pervert, and psychologists feared that teenage girls and boys could easily be "aroused to sexual indulgence and perversion by certain types of motions and hysteria—the type that was exhibited at the Presley show." In August 1956 in Jacksonville, Florida, a local juvenile court judge called Presley a "savage" and threatened to arrest him if he shook his body while performing at Jacksonville's Florida Theatre, justifying the restrictions by saying his music was undermining the youth of America. Presley's uninhibited and sexually charged performance style was overall a direct challenge to the reserved social norms of the 1950s.

In an interview with PBS television, social historian Eric Lott said, "all the citizens' councils in the South called Elvis 'nigger music' and were terribly afraid that Elvis, white as he was, being ambiguously raced just by being working-class, was going to corrupt the youth of America." Robert Kaiser says Elvis was the first who gave the people "a music that hit them where they lived, deep in their emotions, yes, even below their belts. Other singers had been doing this for generations, but they were black." Therefore, his performance style was frequently criticized. Social guardians blasted anyone responsible for exposing impressionable teenagers to his "gyrating figure and suggestive gestures". The Louisville chief of police, for instance, called for a no-wiggle rule, so as to halt "any lewd, lascivious contortions that would excite the crowd". Even Priscilla Presley confirms that "his performances were labeled obscene. My mother stated emphatically that he was 'a bad influence for teenage girls. He arouses things in them that shouldn't be aroused.'" However, the economic power of Presley's fans became evident when they tuned in to alternative radio stations playing his records.

Presley seemed bemused by all the criticism. On another of the many occasions he was challenged to justify the furor surrounding him, he said, "I don't see how they think [my act] can contribute to juvenile delinquency. If there's anything I've tried to do, I've tried to live a straight, clean life and not set any kind of a bad example. You cannot please everyone."

Elvis's musical capital never expanded enough for him to transcend the stigma of his background as a truck driver from the rural South. "No matter how successful Elvis became... he remained fundamentally disreputable in the minds of many Americans... He was the sharecropper's son in the big house, and it always showed."

== Academia ==
Academics at Colorado State University have used the films of Presley as tools for teaching critical theory topics such as new historicism, gender studies and feminist studies.

A 2026 study by researchers at Radboud University and the Delft University of Technology found that since the 1990s, at least 195 peer-reviewed papers across various disciplines had been published with titles quoting or making puns related to Presley's song names or lyrics, making him the second most frequently quoted band and musician, behind The Beatles (3200 references), but ahead of Michael Jackson (65 references).

== Recognizability amongst the general public ==
Presley made a large enough impact on society that traditions are carried on to remember him to this day. A candle lighting is held in Memphis, Tennessee, at his Graceland Estate each year on August 15 in his honor. Also, singers that worked with Presley hold a "nostalgia concert" as a tribute to him. Presley was a big fan of Karate, and an Elvis Presley Memorial Karate Tournament was organized many years ago to let others enjoy something he used to love so much. The tournament has a large turnout, with around 500 competitors each year. Last, a Sock Hop is held, playing his songs and portraying some of his artwork.

== See also ==
- Cultural depictions of Elvis Presley
- List of best selling music artists
- List of accolades received by Elvis Presley
- 24 Hour Church of Elvis
- Elvis Herselvis
- Elvis sightings
- Jukka Ammondt, a Finnish literature professor who has recorded songs of Elvis Presley in Latin and Sumerian.
- Pop-culture tourism

== Bibliography ==
- Bertrand, M. T. (2009). Race, Rock, and Elvis. University of Illinois Press. ISBN 978-0252025860.
- Carr, Roy; Farren, Mick (1989). Elvis Presley: The Complete Illustrated Record. Plexus Publishing Ltd. ISBN 0906008549.
- "Elvis International Tribute Week." Holidays, Festivals, and Celebrations of the World Dictionary, edited by Helene Henderson, Omnigraphics, Inc., 5th edition, 2015.
- "The Transformation of Popular Culture." Modern American Lives: Individuals and Issues in American History Since 1945, Blaine T. Browne, and Robert C. Cottrell, Routledge, 1st edition, 2007
