= Jesse Aron =

American musician

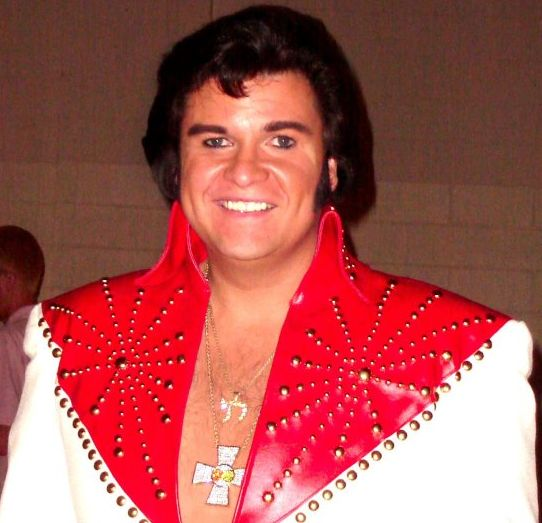

Jesse Aron (born September 16, 1975) is an American Elvis tribute artist. Born in Chicago, Illinois, he is best known for his vocal styles that are similar to Elvis Presley. He has won several awards for his work as an Elvis tribute artist in contests and showcases.

Aron started paying tribute to Elvis in 1998, performing primarily in and around his hometown. Janesville, Wisconsin at local fairs and nightclubs.

In 2003 Aron entered his first competition at the Potawatomi Bingo Casino Tribute To The King Competition in Milwaukee, Wisconsin, where he won first place twice during the four-day event.

On August 16, 2009, Aron won the Images of The King World Championship in Memphis, TN the longest standing world championship ETA competition in the world.

In 2012 and 2013 Aron qualified for the semi-finals in Elvis Presley Enterprises' Ultimate Elvis Tribute Artist Contest in Memphis, TN., representing Oneida Casino Rockin E Jamboree and Lake George ElvisFest, respectively.

In 2013, Aron was named Collingwood Elvis Festival Pro 70's Champion and Collingwood Elvis Festival Overall Grand Champion, earning the highest score in the largest Elvis Festival and Contest in the world.

In 2014, Jesse Aron was award Vocalist of The Year at the Elvis Tribute Artist Industry Awards in Memphis, Tennessee.

Aron has also received 2 letters of commendation from governors of Wisconsin.

Aron also performs as Roy Orbison and is accompanied in his shows by his wife, Tarie, a Connie Francis Tribute Artist.

Aron currently resides in Green Bay, Wisconsin.
