= In Dreams: Roy Orbison in Concert =

2018 hologram concert tour

In Dreams: Roy Orbison in Concert was a 2018 posthumous hologram tour featuring a holographic projection of Roy Orbison performing with a live orchestra. The tour kicked off in the United Kingdom in April 2018 and continued in North America later in the year.
