= 2003 Mid-south derecho =

Weather event

Mid-South Derecho of 2003
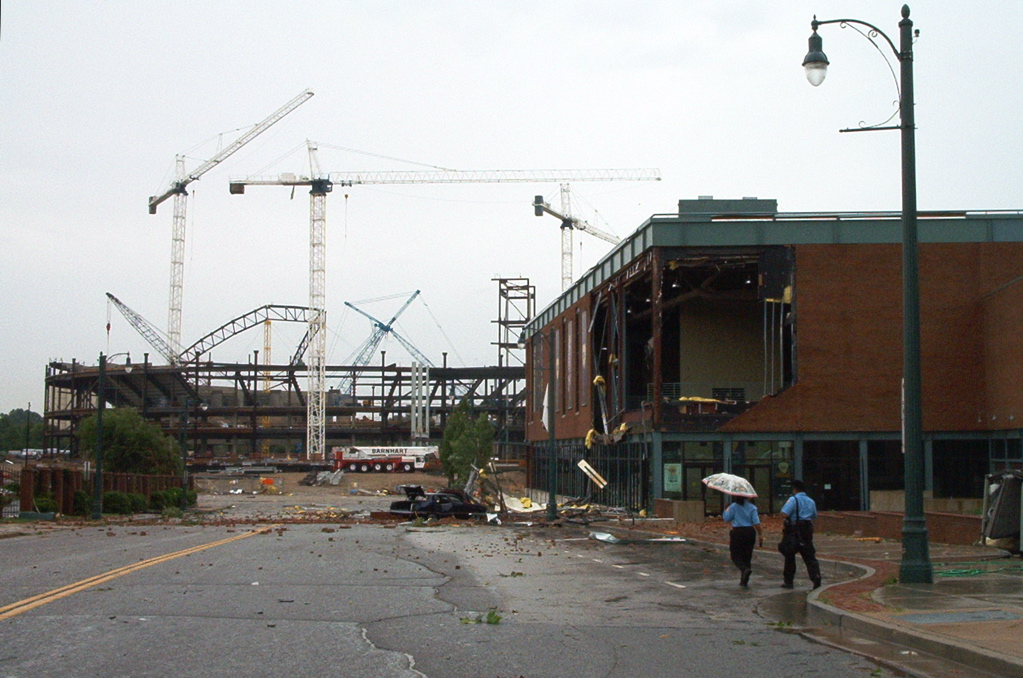
- Damage to the Gibson Memphis Showcase following the storm. Damage to the FedExForum (still under construction) can be seen in the background.
- Date(s): July 22, 2003
- Duration: 7 hours (3:00 AM-10:00 AM)
- Peak wind gust (measured): 102 mph (164 km/h; 45.6 m/s) (Memphis, Tennessee)
- Fatalities: 7 total
- Damage costs: $500 million
- Areas affected: United States Mid-south

The mid-south derecho of 2003 was a severe derecho event that affected parts of the southern United States, particularly southwestern Tennessee and northern Mississippi, including the Memphis metropolitan area. It left 7 people dead and enormous damage across the region.

== Storm ==
On July 22, 2003, a progressive derecho with straight-line winds in excess of 100 miles per hour (160 km/h) struck Crittenden, DeSoto, Fayette, and Shelby counties, including the city of Memphis. Severe damage was reported throughout the city. Surrounding counties also reported damage. The storm passed through the area between 6 and 7 am.

== Impact ==
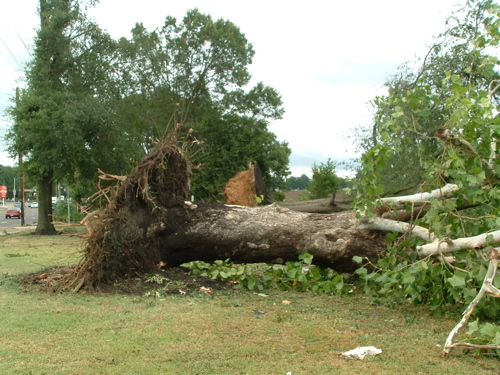
A tree uprooted by the derecho.

Over 300,000 homes, 70% of Shelby County, were left without power in the wake of the storm. Two individuals were left dead as a direct result of the storm, with several more deaths due to fires caused by unattended candles or generator accidents.

This storm was very similar to the derecho that went through Kansas City, Missouri in June 1982, as well as one that hit St. Louis, Missouri on July 19, 2006.

=== Earning colloquial "hurricane" status ===
The storm became commonly known in the area as "Hurricane Elvis" as its winds reached the level of a Category 2 hurricane. As the storm crossed the Mississippi River into Downtown Memphis, a barge recorded an unofficial wind reading of 108 mph (174 km/h). Coincidentally, the National Hurricane Center's rotation of tropical cyclone names had identified that season's "D" storm, "Danny," only two days earlier, thus the region's next real hurricane, Hurricane Erika (2003), would also start with an "E." The National Weather Service refers to the storm as the "Mid South Derecho of 2003".

== Aftermath ==
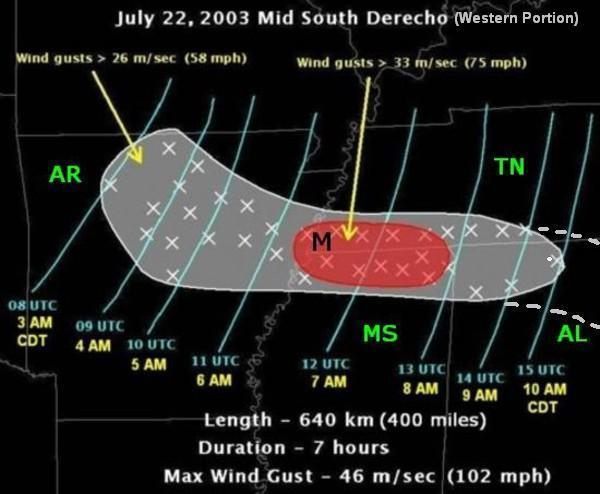
Graphic of Memphis Derecho (courtesy of NOAA)

It took two weeks to restore power to many of those who had lost it in the storm. Temperatures reached past 90 °F (32 °C) leaving many residents unprotected from dangerously hot conditions. In terms of damage and destruction, it was considered to be one of the worst storms that had ever hit the city of Memphis. Many Memphians were distressed that though they had survived hurricane-like conditions and weeks without power, little national news coverage was given to the event. Shelby County Mayor A.C. Wharton said in a CNBC interview that he was "Feeling a bit lonely, because it seems that from a national perspective it never happened. We suffered a 'dry-land hurricane'... yet we see on the national news over in Galveston, they got more coverage on a hurricane that never did occur." In contrast, less than a month later, national news coverage was extensive when New York City residents were left without power for a few hours.

== FEMA dispute ==
In 2009, the United States Department of Homeland Security claimed that the city of Memphis owed the Federal Emergency Management Agency $2 million. It claimed that Memphis misspent the money that was originally given to help clean up the city following Hurricane Elvis.

== See also ==
- List of derecho events
- Meteorology
- Extreme weather
