= Knowledge Bennett =

American visual artist

- Born: New Jersey
- Movement: contemporary art, pop art
- Website: knowledgebennett.com

Knowledge Bennett is a Los Angeles–based visual artist known for his signature style that fuses pop art with contemporary and historical imagery. His provocative hybrid painting of Chairman Mao Zedong and Donald Trump was featured in the Chinese edition of New York Times. Bennett's work has been illustrated and discussed in publications including Vogue and the Huffington Post and exhibited internationally at art fairs including Art Basel.

== Early history ==
Bennett is a self-taught artist from Asbury Park, New Jersey. In 2014, he relocated to Los Angeles. Motivated by an entrepreneurial spirit and interest in art history, Bennett started collecting fine art and taught himself various production processes, including photography and silk-screening.

== Canvas art ==
The subject of Bennett's art often surrounds appropriated photographs of famous creatives that he alters in different ways to emphasize social issues, like racism and identity politics, that plague American society. His production techniques, use of the same image in serial repetition, and even some of the images themselves, are inspired by Andy Warhol.

=== Obama Cowboy, 2012 ===
In 2012, Bennett began working with appropriation techniques and quotations of Warhol in his series Obama Cowboy. Here Bennett replaces the face of Elvis Presley in Warhol's Elvis (Cowboy), 1963 with the face of President Obama. This re-purposing introduces the conversation of race into the image and explores matters of gun culture, gun control and the meaning of the Second Amendment in contemporary society.

=== Cojones, 2014 ===
For this series, Bennett appropriates the famous 1989 photograph taken by Janette Beckman of the rapper Slick Rick grabbing his groin, keeping the body and altering the meaning of the image by changing the face, Using historic and contemporary figures . In his new iteration of the image, Bennett emphasizes the defiance and courage of the icons he selects.

In 2016, Bennett exhibited several paintings from his Cojones series at Art Southampton on Long Island.

=== Share a Coke (Coke Bottle), 2015 ===
2015 marked the centennial of Coca-Cola's revolutionary bottle design. Bennett took this opportunity to celebrate not only the company but also Warhol's iconic image of the Coca-Cola bottle, updating the design to reflect its contemporary branding. Bennett first exhibited works from this series during SCOPE Art Show.

=== Mao Trump, 2015 ===
To maximize his political statement, Bennett combined an image of Chairman Mao Zedong originally silk-screened by Andy Warhol in 1972 with an image of then-American businessman Donald Trump who later announced his intention to run for public office. For Bennett, this controversial image illustrates the perils of power as it pertains to both Eastern and Western political, cultural, and economic systems.

=== Orange is the New Black, 2016 ===
In the series Orange is the New Black, Bennett's most political to date, Bennett uses his signature silk-screening technique and serial formats to engage in a conversation surrounding institutional racism and continued disruption within the black community in America. Utilizing images of highly politicized figures and printing them in an orange color reminiscent of prison jumpsuits, Bennett identifies factual wrongdoing and abuse dating back to the 1930s.
