= The Gift (2015 Scottish film) =

Short film

- Written by: Gabriel Robertson
- Produced by: Ken Petrie
- Starring: Brady Permenter; Amye Gousset; Xander Berkeley
- Music by: Blair Mowat
- Production company: 27 Ten Productions
- Release date: 19 June 2015 (United Kingdom)
- Running time: 13 minutes
- Country: United Kingdom
- Language: English

The Gift is a 2015 Scottish short film by 27 Ten Productions based on Elvis Presley's 11th birthday. It was directed and written by Gabriel Robertson and stars Brady Permenter, Amye Gousset, and Xander Berkeley. It was produced in Presley's hometown of Tupelo, Mississippi.

== Plot ==
Elvis and his mother, Gladys, drive to Tupelo Hardware Co. for him to choose a birthday present for his 11th birthday. Although Elvis had always had a bike in his eye, he instead chooses a rifle, much to his mother's dismay. After she prohibits him from buying the gun, the store owner takes him outside and persuades him to buy a guitar instead. Elvis accepts the instrument and starts to become attached to it on the way home. The film ends with Elvis entering their house, with a sign saying "Presley" on the front door.

== Cast ==
- Brady Permenter as Boy
- Amye Gousset as Mother
- Xander Berkeley as Forrest Bobo

== Production ==
The Gift was filmed on location in Tupelo, Mississippi. The credits include a recording of Presley's single "That's All Right".

== Reception ==
The film has received mostly positive reviews.

== Awards ==
Award	Category	Recipients	Result
Tupelo Film Festival	Best International Short Film	Ken Petrie 27 Ten Productions	Won
Tupelo Film Festival	Honorable Mention	Brady Permenter	Won
Sanford International Film Festival	Best Director	Gabriel Robertson	Nominated
Sanford International Film Festival	Best Acting	Ensemble	Nominated
Sanford International Film Festival	Audience Award	Ken Petrie 27 Ten Productions	Nominated
Oxford Film Festival	Best Mississippi Narrative Film	Ken Petrie 27 Ten Productions	Won
Honolulu Film Awards	Best Short	Ken Petrie 27 Ten Productions	Won
Foyle Film Festival	Best Short Film	Ken Petrie 27 Ten Productions	Nominated
Edinburgh International Film Festival	Best Short Film	Ken Petrie 27 Ten Productions	Nominated
Dublin International Short Film and Music Festival	Best International Short Film	Ken Petrie 27 Ten Productions	Won
