= Steve Kaufman =

American pop artist (1960–2010)

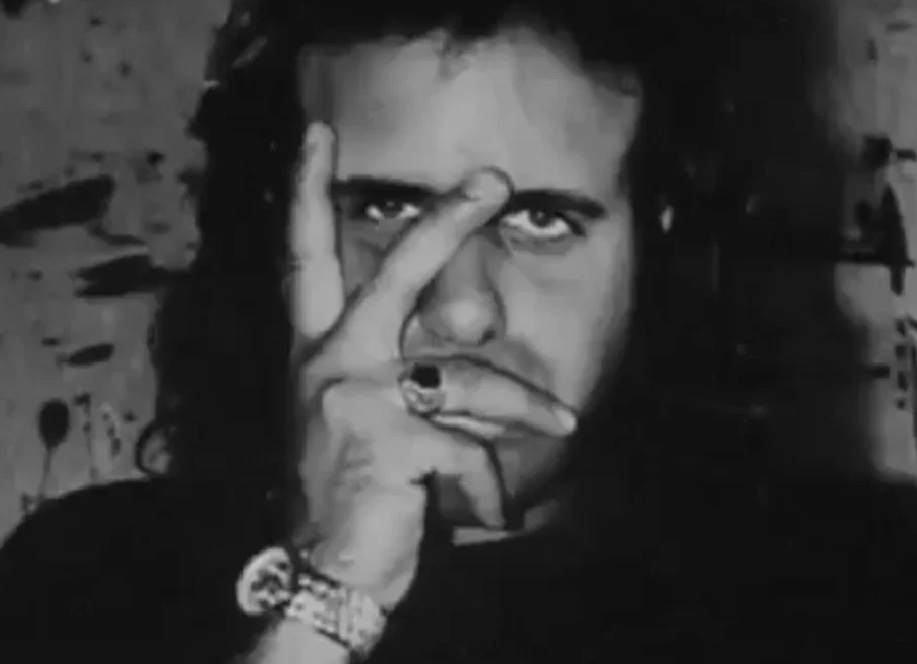
- Born: December 29, 1960; Bronx, New York
- Died: February 12, 2010 (aged 49); Vail, Colorado
- Other name: Steven Alan Kaufman "SAK"
- Occupation: American Artist
- Known for: Andy Warhols assistant
- Website: americanpopartinc.com

Steven Alan Kaufman (also known as Steve Kaufman, December 29, 1960 – February 12, 2010) was an American pop artist, fine artist, sculptor, stained glass artist, filmmaker, photographer and humanitarian. His entry into the world of serious pop art began in his teens when he became an assistant to Andy Warhol at The Factory studio, who nicknamed him "SAK". Kaufman eventually executed such pieces as a 144-foot-long canvas which later toured the country.

== Early life ==
Steve Kaufman was born in 1960 in the Bronx, New York. Kaufman was the middle child, surrounded by an extended family, many of whom were painters and sculptors that were a significant influence on him and his views on art. His father died when he was four years old. His mother painted high fashion oils on canvas, and he was taught sculpting by his uncles. Kaufman commented on his family, "They taught me that to be an artist is to be always changing. So I tried all different forms of art and today I have 15 different styles that I work in. Art should always be about changing. A lot of artists will work in one medium their whole career, but I didn't want to ever get bored. I was taught that canvas is not the only thing to paint on."

At the age of eight, he was sponsored by a Jewish temple in the Bronx, and held his first one-man art show at a Bronx bank, presenting images that were later donated to the Museum of Jewish Heritage.

In 1975, Kaufman participated in a group graffiti art show at the Whitney Museum of American Art.

== Career ==
=== 1980s ===
By the time he was 16, Kaufman was going to Studio 54 and associating with people from the 1970s New York City art community.

Kaufman attended Manhattan's School of Visual Arts (SVA). In 1981 Kaufman met Andy Warhol, who became a significant influence on the 19-year-old Kaufman, who worked as Warhol's assistant at his studio, The Factory, producing original paintings and silkscreens. "As Warhol's assistant, I learned to silkscreen with oils that will last forever. That's the same process I use today. Andy Warhol never did giclées. Neither will I." said Kaufman. Kaufman designed theme parties for various nightclubs, sold his paintings to Calvin Klein and Steve Rubell, and participated in a group art show with pop artist Keith Haring, whom he had met at the SVA.

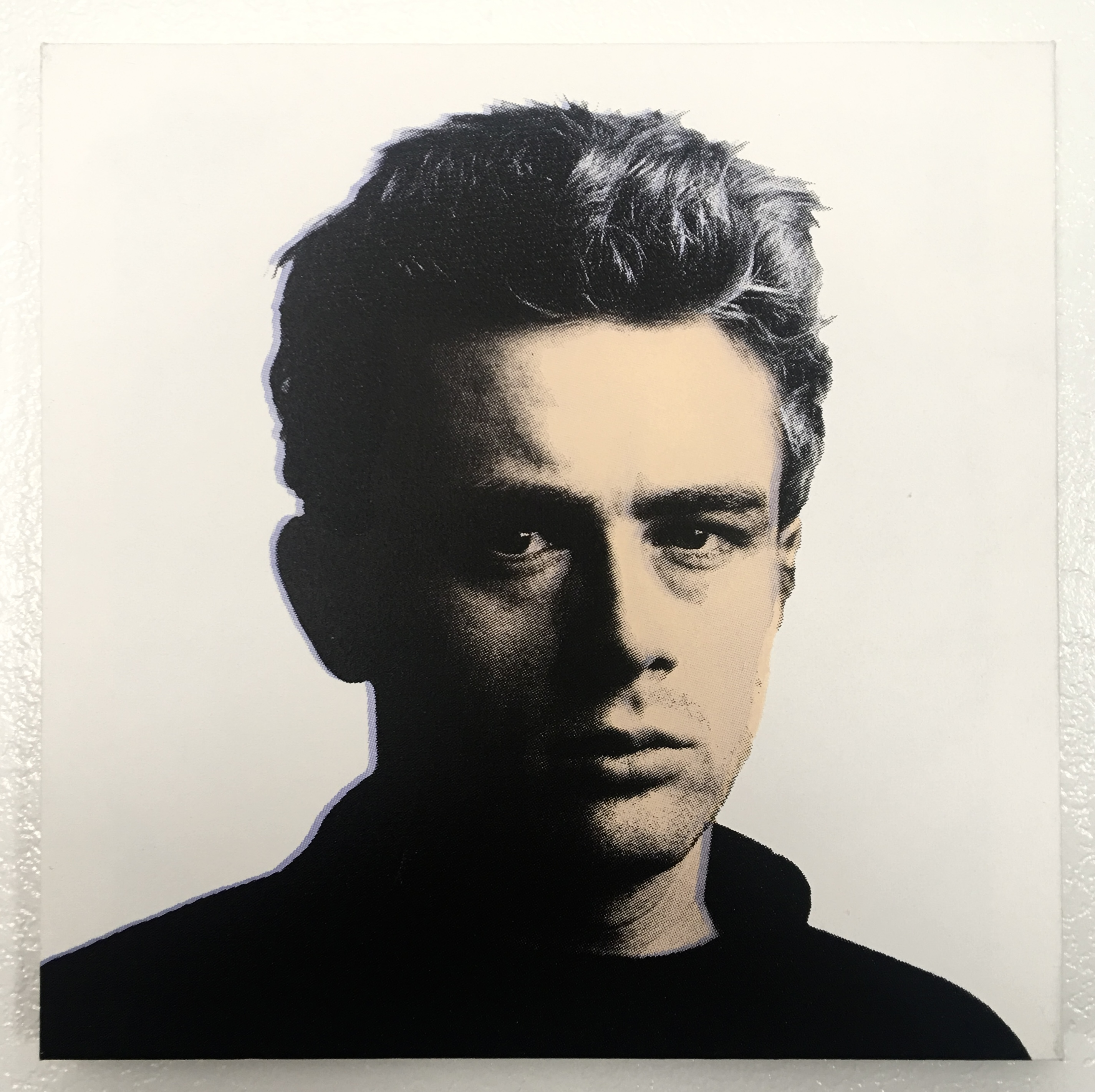
"James Dean" by Steve Kaufman, SAK. Bodnar family collection

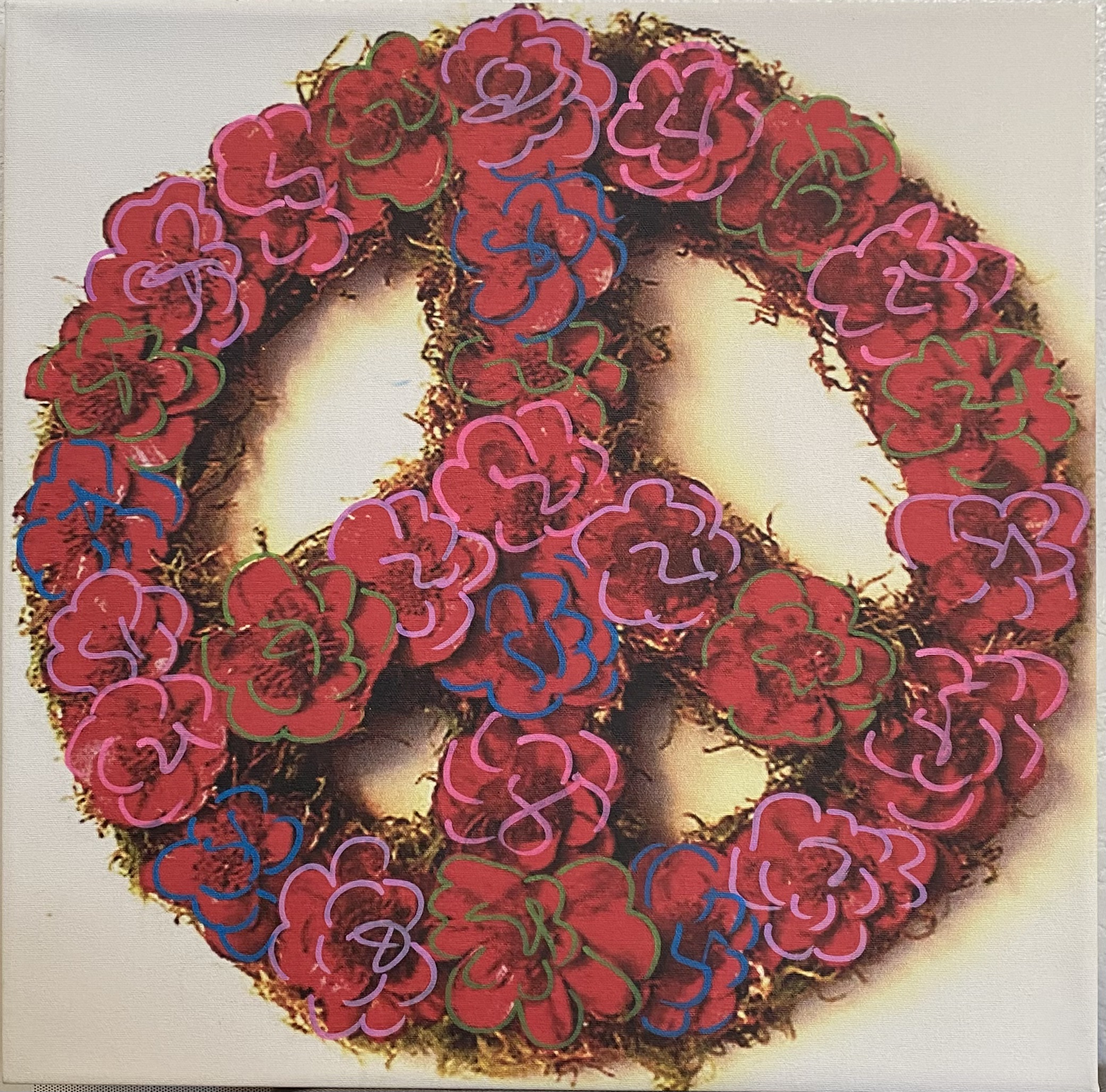
"Peace" by Steve Kaufman, SAK. Hand Signed and Numbered Limited Edition Hand Pulled silkscreen mixed media on Canvas. Created to raise money for his charity GKAB, Give Kids a Break.

Kaufman created the graphics for NBC's Saturday Night Live. Kaufman graduated from SVA with a Bachelor of Fine Arts degree and held art shows in London.

In the late 1980s, Kaufman participated in an AIDS demonstration in order to lock the New York City mayor in his own office, during which he was arrested. Kaufman campaigned for AIDS awareness with art shows featuring 5'x 5' paintings of Trojan condom wrappers. He held a condom art exhibition at Main Fine Art, Edinburgh College of Art, Zanzibar Club and the Smith Gallery.

Leaving Warhol's Factory, Kaufman established his own SAK Studio, hiring homeless New Yorkers to assist him. He painted portraits of three homeless persons for Transportation Display, Inc. that where later shown in 46 cities on bus billboards, helping to raise $4.72 million to benefit the homeless. Kaufman created the first "Racial Harmony" mural in Harlem to raise attention of inner-city problems. He showed at the White Gallery as a tribute to those who died from AIDS. The "Say Without Art" tribute was based on this show. Kaufman also exhibited his works at the Loft Gallery in Tokyo, Japan.

=== 1990s ===
By the early 1990s, Kaufman's work was highly in demand, but Kaufman wanted to remain in touch with a broad, public audience. He staged a one-man, one-night show. Using 4 New York subway cars, the sides of abandoned buildings and retaining walls, Kaufman created 55 "Racial Harmony" murals with Malcolm X images and appears on Fox TV, MTV and radio stations to promote racial tolerance and harmony. Kaufman presented the Underground Artist of the Year award (1991–92). He painted a portrait of Mickey Mantle to hang in Mantle's restaurant and a portrait of Joe Frazier to raise money for the Police Athletic League. Kaufman created the AIDS Memorial in New York City, and covered the letter "D" on the Hollywood sign in red cloth in remembrance of those who had died of AIDS.

In 1993, Kaufman moved his studio to Los Angeles and began painting in a new style he called 'comic book pop art'. He used images of Superman, Batman, Spider-Man and others. To assist him in his studio, Kaufman hired more than 100 ex-gang members released from prison.

In 1995 Kaufman published works for Martin Lawrence Limited Editions, hand-embellishing works including limited editions of Beethoven and Marilyn Monroe. He painted portraits of Muhammad Ali and John Travolta, "who autographed their editions." Kaufman worked with comic book writer and creator Stan Lee. Kaufman, working with parole officers in South Central Los Angeles, hired more than 200 ex-gang-member prison released individuals to assist in the studio and receives an award from Los Angeles Mayor Riordan. According to the Steve Kaufman Museum, Kaufman increased his contributions in 1995 to include 100 different charities. In 1996 Kaufman approached the Sinatra family to gain permission to paint Frank Sinatra's image. Reportedly, the ailing Sinatra ran his frail hands over the completed paintings and nodded his appreciation, tears in his eyes. Kaufman was requested by Campbell's to paint a limited edition in celebration of Campbell Soup's 100th anniversary. He painted Muhammad Ali's face on 500 boxing gloves, and painted two Harley-Davidson motorcycles, one with a Campbell's Soup theme and one with a Cohiba cigar theme. Fidel Castro, Cuba's leader, reportedly autographed the gas tank of the Cohiba motorcycle. Kaufman created a Muhammad Ali portrait for the 1996 Olympics. For the first time, Ali signed a limited edition with both his Muslim name (Muhammad Ali) and his given name (Cassius Clay).

From 1997 to 1998 Kaufman's portraits of Frank Sinatra appeared on Larry King Live, and in art shows that Kaufman held in Japan and Amsterdam. He participated in a boxing exhibition against European boxing champion Don Diego and is awarded the win, after some minor controversy. Kaufman painted another Harley-Davidson motorcycle which was now dedicated to the Los Angeles Dodgers baseball team. It is driven around Dodger Stadium before each game. At the time, Kaufman has hired 546 ex-gang-members and supports more than 175 charities.

In the late 1990s Kaufman experienced both a cardiac episode and was involved in a motorcycle accident. He released works such as Sinatra's Rat Pack and Mug Shot, Al Pacino as "the Godfather" and "Scarface", New York City radio personality Howard Stern, Barbie, and two new editions of Marilyn Monroe. Other works included portraits of Van Gogh and Picasso in a new, 100% hand-painted edition.

=== 2000s ===
In 2001 Kauman continued to support more than 170 charities each year and has hired more than 759 ex-gang members to assist at his studio. Kaufman creates two new painting styles, "portrait collage" and "museum art". Examples of portrait collage include his works "Rat Pack", "Hollywood Marilyn", "Van Gogh" and "Jackie Kennedy", in which he added a collage of images to the main portrait. An example of Kaufman's museum art includes the September 11 Memorial Painting which was a tribute to the heroes of the World Trade Center attacks. Kaufman created a 20 by 500 feet (6.1 m × 152.4 m) series of paintings to commemorate the 35-year history of Caesars Palace in Las Vegas, drawing 10 million visitors in the first 4 months.

In 2003 Kaufman suffered a major stroke following Art Expo, New York. He recovers to show in Las Vegas where he was honored by Mayor Oscar Goodman, the Nevada governor and senator for Steve Kaufman Day on May 31. Kaufman was so honored for his humanitarian efforts. In December, he met President Bill Clinton at his Harlem office held to honor artists whose works Clinton hangs. An imposing figure at 6'7", often wearing a white suit jacket upon which he'd drawn or painted pop icons, Kaufman once took the jacket off his back and presented it to President Bill Clinton who had it framed and displayed in his office. Kaufman donated art and participated in "Love Ride" with Jay Leno and Peter Fonda for the tenth consecutive year.

In 2006, his health seemingly improved, Kaufman increased his schedule, showing in New York, Las Vegas, Washington D.C., Vail, Beaver Creek, Aspen, Santa Fe, Rancho Mirage, Newport Beach, Laguna Beach, Key West and Maui. Kaufman creates "mini-heart paintings" to present as gifts to children who attend his shows and free framed plates for those who purchase. Kaufman returned to creating one-of-a-kind originals to be sold exclusively at shows. Kaufman visited Ellis Island as a guest of Lee Iacocca and meets TV anchor Ernie Anastos whose portrait he paints and presents on the set of Fox News, New York.

In 2009, Steve Kaufman's series of Coca-Cola paintings were featured at The Pop Culture Gallery at The World of Coca-Cola in Atlanta, Georgia.

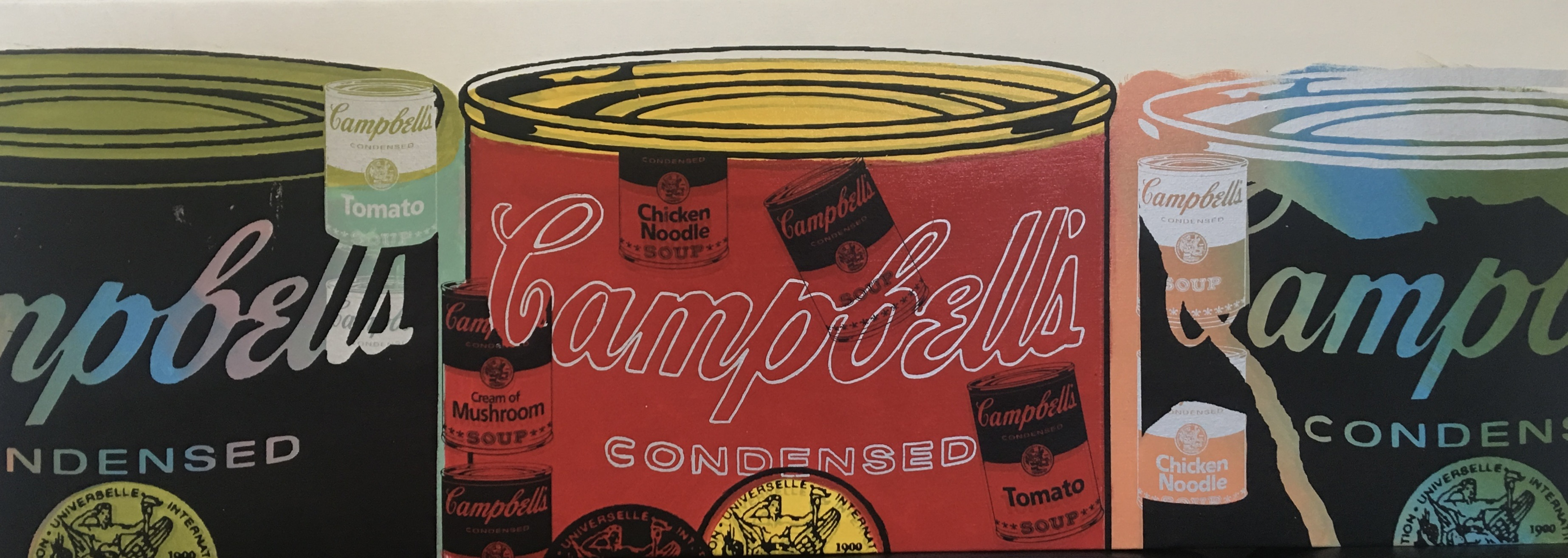
"Campbell's Cans" by Steve Kaufman, SAK. Johnny Blanco Collection

Among Kaufman's more recognizable images were Marilyn Monroe, Frank Sinatra, the Beatles, Elvis Presley, B.B. King, Sammy Davis Jr., Al Pacino, Muhammad Ali (Cassius Clay), President Barack Obama, Jay Leno, John Travolta, mobster John Gotti, Beethoven, Napoleon and such icons of Americana as the $100 bill, Coca-Cola images, and artwork for the Campbell Soup Company.

== Declining health and death ==
Kaufman suffered a series of debilitating strokes beginning in 2004, dying of a heart attack in Vail, Colorado, on February 12, 2010, as he prepared for an art show. "If I stop doing shows, I might as well stop living. This is what I live for," Kaufman had once stated. "I had a great life, so please don't cry for me. I've had the life of 100 men," he wrote.

== Legacy ==
When Steve Kaufman died in 2010, he left his licensing rights to Diana Vachier. Diana Vachier went on to carry Steve's legacy with "American Pop Art Inc." and "Steve Kaufman Art Licensing LLC", collective which features works from Steve Kaufman, as well as other prominent artists.

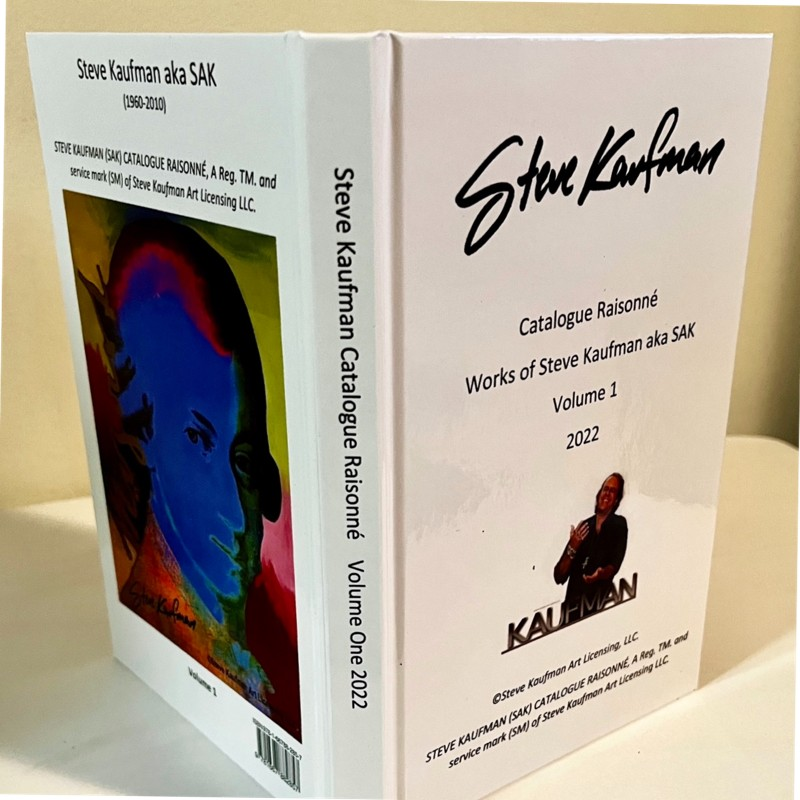
Authentic works of art can be found in The Steve Kaufman Catalogue Raisonne, Volume 1 by Diana Vachier

The Steve Kaufman Catalogue Raisonne, Volume 1 has been released. Additional volumes will be released as additional artworks are authenticated .

== Honors and museums ==
Since his death, Steve Kaufman's artwork has appeared in several television programs, art tourism hotels, and a number of international exhibitions including:

- "Writing as an Image, Writing within an Image" (2012) at the Andy Warhol Museum of Modern Art in northeastern Slovakia, and located in the hometown of Warhol's parents. This exhibition featured more than 150 works by Andy Warhol, plus works by Warhol's colleagues Steve Kaufman, Robert Indiana, Roy Lichtenstein, and Jean-Michael Basquiat.
- "This is POP ART!" (2012) at El Museo de Pasión de Valladolid, España (The Museum of Passion in Valladolid, Spain), which featured works by Steve Kaufman, Keith Haring, Robert Indiana, Roy Lichtenstein, Robert Rauschenberg, and Andy Warhol.
- "Pop Art In Trieste: Steve Kaufman, the Former Assistant to Andy Warhol" (2013) at the Palazzo Costanzi in Trieste, Italy, an exhibition in collaboration with the municipality of Trieste and dedicated in its entirety to the late artist Steve Kaufman. More than 13,000 visitors came to see this exhibition, which featured 30 works from notable collections.
- "Pure Pop Art" (2013) at the Marcos Valcárcel Cultural Center in Ourense, Galicia, Spain, an exhibition that featured works by artists Andy Warhol, Steve Kaufman, Roy Lichtenstein, Keith Haring, Robert Rauschenberg, Mel Ramos, Pietro Psaier, and Robert Indiana.
- "Icons of Pop Art, Then and Now" (2013–2014) at the Museo Casa Enzo Ferrari in Modena, Italy, a convergence of vintage sports cars with contemporary art. This exhibition, inspired by artist Steve Kaufman's 2006 series of Ferrari paintings, features approximately 40 works by Steve Kaufman, Andy Warhol, Roy Litchenstein, Russell Young, Burton Morris, and Romero Britto.
- In 2014, the honorary portrait "Mozart State II" painted in 1997 by Steve Alan Kaufman was added to the Permanent Collection at the Internationale Stiftung Mozarteum, the official Mozart museum and residence in Salzburg, Austria. Steve Kaufman is the first American artist to achieve this prestigious honor.
