= Walther Lauffs =

German industrialist

Walther Lauffs was a German industrialist, and together with his wife Helga, a leading collector of post-war art.

Lauffs lived in Bad Honnef, Germany.

Walther and Helga Lauffs collected art from the late 1960s onwards, with the help of the curator and art historian Paul Wember, who was director of Krefeld's Kaiser Wilhelm Museum from 1947 and 1975. They focused on art created in the 1960s and 1970s, including Pop Art, Arte Povera, Minimalism, Post-Minimalism, and Conceptual Art.

Their collection included work by Joseph Beuys, Mel Bochner, Lee Bontecou, Christo, Joseph Cornell, Hanne Darboven, Jan Dibbets, Lucio Fontana, Eva Hesse, Donald Judd, On Kawara, Yves Klein, Joseph Kosuth, Sol LeWitt, Piero Manzoni, John McCracken, Mario Merz, Robert Morris, Bruce Nauman, Louise Nevelson, Claes Oldenburg, Giulio Paolini, Michelangelo Pistoletto, Fred Sandback, George Segal, Richard Serra, Richard Tuttle, Cy Twombly, Günther Uecker, Tom Wesselmann, and Douglas Wheeler.

In 2008, Sotheby's auctioned their collection of post-war European art, for $140 million.
