= Elvis Presley Forever stamp =

2015 American forever stamp

- Country of production: USA
- Date of production: August 12, 2015
- Designer: Antonio Alcalá, Leslie Badani
- Commemorates: Elvis Presley
- Depicts: Elvis Presley in 1955
- Estimated value: 49¢

The Elvis Presley Forever stamp is a forever postage stamp released as a part of the Music Icons series issued by the United States Postal Service. It features Presley in a 1955 black and white photograph taken by William Speer. The design created by Antonio Alcalá and Leslie Badani also features a golden crown and the signature of Presley on the side.

The stamp was dedicated on August 12, 2015, during a ceremony in Graceland, attended by Priscilla Presley and Postmaster General Megan Brennan. The release of the stamp was accompanied by a hit compilation album, Elvis Forever, sold through post offices around the United States and on the internet.

The first stamps, and earliest known use (EKU), were purchased August 10, 2015 at the Mason, Tennessee post office by stamp collector David Saks.
