= Marc Lacroix (photographer) =

French photographer

Marc Lacroix (1927 – 2007) was a French photographer.

== Career ==
Lacroix's photography career began in the 1950s. He primarily became known for his portraiture work featuring surrealist artist Salvador Dalí, whom he met in 1970.
