= Collingwood Elvis Festival =

The Collingwood Elvis Festival was an annual event featuring Elvis Tribute Artists, started in 1995. It was held in Collingwood, Ontario, Canada, and drew an international selection of performers and saw attendees from worldwide destinations.

The festival retired in 2019 after 25 years.

== Background ==
In 1995 former Elvis tribute artist Billy Cann collaborated with the town of Collingwood to bring in The Canadian National Elvis Tribute and Convention. The festival was sanctioned by Elvis Presley Enterprises under an annual Licence Agreement. During the week of the festival, Elvis tribute artists perform in local bars and night clubs, with "Vegas style" shows in the municipal arena. The highlight of the festival is on a main stage in the center of the town. The festival historically includes a candlelight vigil and an Elvis Tribute Artist Parade.

== Past performers ==
The winner of the first festival was Ray Guillemette Jr. Guillemette and he has since performed at every Collingwood Elvis Festival except in 2001 when he was hit by a drunk driver and lost his leg. He returned to the festival in 2002 and competed again through the use of a prosthetic limb.

Hal Niedzviecki's book, Hello, I'm Special: How Individuality Became the New Conformity tells of a former Anglican priest, Rev. Dorian Baxter who went by the name of Elvis Priestly was no longer welcome at the festival due to his performing Elvis funerals for dead fans. Baxter was persuaded by his daughter to enter the festival in 1996. Rosemarie O'Brien, Collingwood Elvis Festival Event Co-Ordinator for the Town of Collingwood, confirmed that Rev. Baxter has never been unwelcome at the festival, but would be required to adhere to the festival's rules and guidelines which precludes any activity that could be interpreted by Elvis Presley Enterprises as derogatory to the image and likeness of Elvis Presley, and could, therefore, jeopardize the festival's license agreement.

Previous international winners of the Collingwood Elvis Festival include Elvis Tribute Artists from the United Kingdom, Australia, the U.S., and Germany.

== Historical Winners ==
- 1995 - Ray Guillemette Jr., Anthony Giavon
- 1996 - Anthony Giavon, Pasquale Ferro, Vili Verhovsek, Will Chalmers
- 1997 - Eric Gustafson, Ray Guillemette Jr., Shawn Barry, Thomas Gilbo
- 1998 - Shawn Barry, Matt King, Pete Irwin, Leo Days
- 1999 - Chris Purtee, Roy LeBlanc
- 2000 - Dean Vegas, Shane Jeffery
- 2001 - Roy LeBlanc, Paul Ross, and Lance Dobinson (Youth)
- 2002 - Robin Kelly, Darrin Hagel, and Paul Fracassi (Youth)
- 2003 - Gino Monopoli, Jeff Bodner, with Zach Peddie, Matthew Lawrence (Youth)
- 2004 - Shon Carroll, David Lee Roseberry, Pete Paquette, Marcus Wells, and Steven Pelleriti, Paul Fracassi (Youth)
- 2005 - Ben Klein, Roy Evans, Glenn Aitchison, David Stewart, with Brenen Katolinsky, Joshua Bravener (Youth), and Ray Guillemette Jr. (Gospel)
- 2006 - Pete Paquette, Irv Cass, Lance Dobinson, David Muggeridge, with Brenen Katolinsky, Brycen Katolinsky (Youth), and Paul Ross (Gospel)
- 2007 - Dwight Icenhower, Jay Zanier, Chris Ayotte, Doug McKenzie, with Brenen Katolinsky, Matthew Lawrence (Youth), and Anthony Giavon (Gospel)
- 2008 - Pete Paquette, David Muggeridge, James Gibb, John Cigan, with Brenen Katolinsky, Anthony Carbone (Youth), and Roy LeBlanc (Gospel)
- 2009 - Chris Ayotte, Thane Dunn, Brent Morrey, Patrick McGuire, with Luca Lavoie, Anthony Carbone (Youth), and Jay Zanier (Gospel)
- 2010 - Mark Anthony, Andrew Todd (BGP Master), Kenneth Chan, Tim Hendry, Joey Cundari, Rev. Matt Martin, with Ethan Chalmers, Anthony Carbone (Youth), and Ben Klein (Gospel)
- 2011 - James Gibb, Pete Storm, Matt Cage, Wayne Junior, with Connor Russo, Brycen Katolinsky (Youth), and Daylin James (Gospel)
- 2012 - Matt Cage, Ben Portsmouth, Brycen Katolinsky, Anthony Carbone (Non Pro Concert Years), with Connor Russo, Drake Milligan (Youth), and Thane Dunn (Gospel)
- 2013 - Brycen Katolinsky, Jesse Aron, Richard Wolfe, Kevin Bezaire, with Connor Russo, Drake Milligan (Youth), and Norm Ackland Jr. (Gospel)
- 2014 - Cliff Wright, Gordon Hendricks, Brent Freeman, Daniel Barrella, with Hank Poole, Drake Milligan (Youth), and David Lee Roseberry (Gospel)
- 2015 - Austin Irby, Bruno Nesci, Norm Ackland Jr., Eric Evangelista, with Benjamin Dalske, Drake Milligan (Youth), and Corny Rempel (Gospel)
- 2016 - Ryan Pelton, Oliver Steinhoff, Brycen Katolinsky, Sylvain Leduc, with Benjamin Dalske, Connor Russo (Youth), and Matt Cage (Gospel)
- 2017 - Gordon Hendricks, Brycen Katolinsky, Mason Cigan, Dustin Bricker, Connor Russo (Youth) and

Brycen Katolinsky (Gospel).

- 2018 - Tim Hendry, Pete Doiron, and Connor Russo (Youth).
- 2019 - Sylvain Leduc, John Cigan, and Benjamin Dalske (Youth).

== Events within ==
During the festival there is another event called the Live & Original Music Series which began in 2015. More of an event at grass-roots level, this is for unknown artists to show their talents and original material. The winner for the L & O Showdown for 2015 was Gina Horswood and for 2016 was Mike Charette.

== Privatization of management ==
The festival has historically been financially backed by the town of Collingwood, though the last town-funded festival took place in 2019. A member of the Collingwood council cited increased financial risk to the community due to steadily decreasing attendance and revenues, though the festival still had a positive financial impact of over $700,000 in 2018. The annual upfront expense to the town is around $50,000. The town intended to transfer management of the festival to a private backer for the 2020 edition, but no transfer was finalized.

The festival changed hands a few times since the town announced that would no longer be running the annual event. The event never occurred in 2020 due to the COIVD-19 pandemic. The festival returned on July 24-26, 2026 ran by Steve Michaels and Mark Erwin.
