= Elvis Evolution =

Immersive theatrical show

Elvis Evolution is an immersive theatrical show about the life of Elvis Presley. It premiered at the Excel London in 2025. It was created by a British production company called Layered Reality, which claimed to have access to hundreds of hours of video footage and photography from Presley's personal archive at Graceland. The show follows Elvis' life story: from growing up in rural Mississippi, to becoming a global superstar, and ends with a bar featuring a live band. It focuses on Elvis’ childhood friend Sam Bell rather than the singer himself.

It is 110 minutes long. The production has drawn comparisons to ABBA Voyage due to the way it was positioned.

== Reception ==
Reviews have been mixed to unfavourable including one-star reviews from The Telegraph and Daily Express.

Fans of Elvis Presley received the experience poorly when it launched in July 2025, calling it "atrocious and misleading", "embarrassing" and compared it to the Willy's Chocolate Experience in Glasgow.

A collection of customers formed an action group against the production in 2025 claiming to be missold. Many sought a refund because they had been told that it would be a hologram show similar to ABBA Voyage. As of September 2025, some have been successful in their chargeback.
