= Kresse Wesling =

British sustainable entrepreneur

Kresse Anne-Marie Wesling CBE (born 1976 or 1977) is a Canadian-born British entrepreneur and co-founder of the luxury recycled accessories company Elvis and Kresse. She has been a visiting professor at the University of Oxford's Said Business School.

== Early life and education ==
Wesling was born in Edmonton, Alberta, Canada in 1976 or 1977 and moved to Hong Kong aged 17 to study an International Baccalaureate at Li Po Chun United World College from 1994 to 1996. She studied politics and East Asian studies at McGill University in Canada from 1996 to 1999.

== Career ==
Wesling founded an environmental packaging company in Hong Kong in 2002, and brought it to the UK in 2004. She was then involved in a sustainable mother and baby company, Babaloo, and a clothing company, Yew Clothing.

Wesling met members of the London Fire Brigade at a training course and learned, in conversation, that their discarded fire hoses went to landfill. As the hose has a maximum permitted life of 25 years, this represented a large quantity of rubber hose being discarded each year. She and her partner "Elvis" (real name James Henrit) investigated possible uses for the material and, in 2005, set up their company Elvis and Kresse to make handbags and other accessories. The company donates half its profits to the Firefighters' Charity. From 2017 they worked with the Burberry Foundation to use offcuts from the international leather industry, turning waste material into luxury goods.

The company was first based in a mill built in 1837 in Tonge, Kent.

Elvis & Kresse are now based at New Barns Farm in Painter's Forstal, Kent, in a purpose-built 370 m^{2} (4,000 sq ft) workshop with straw bale insulation and solar power.

Wesling has said that the greatest influence on her "sustainability thinking" was her grandmother, who grew up on a farm where "they had to grow their own vegetables in the summer or they wouldn't have food in the winter. Her generation didn’t waste anything and that attitude characterised her whole life."

== Recognition ==
In 2011 Wesling was awarded the Cartier Women's Initiative Awards for Europe.

Wesling was appointed MBE and was appointed CBE in the 2021 Birthday Honours "For services to Sustainable Business".

In 2025 she received the Cartier Impact Award in Osaka, Japan, as part of the Cartier Women's Initiative.
