= Annibale Berlingieri =

Italian heir and art collector

Annibale Berlingieri is an Italian heir and art collector, best known for his 2008 sale of Andy Warhol's painting Eight Elvises for $100 million. He first commissioned a work of art in 1970, when he had Christo wrap an old carriage at his country villa at Taranto in jute bags. For 40 years, he was the owner of Eight Elvises, a 1963 silkscreen painting of Elvis Presley by the American pop artist Andy Warhol, until its sale for $100 million ($111.2 million with fees) in October 2008 to an unknown buyer, a world record for Warhol. Despite several requests, Berlingieri never loaned this painting. Berlingieri first appeared in the ARTnews top 200 collectors in 1992. Berlingieri is based in Rome, Italy. His daughter Lidia Berlingieri Leopardi and her husband, Count Piervittorio Leopardi Dittajuti, are also art collectors.
