= Peter Mars =

American artist

- Born: Peter Mars; 1959 (age 66–67); Portland, Oregon, U.S.
- Known for: Printmaker, Artist, Painting
- Movement: Pop Art

Peter Mars (born 1959 in Portland, Oregon) is an American artist with ties to both the Pop Art and Outsider Art movements.

== Early life and education ==
Mars attended Reed College, a small private college in Portland, Oregon from 1977 to 1982, earning a degree in chemistry.

== Art career ==
In 1982, Mars moved to New Orleans, Louisiana. He lived and worked in the French Quarter during the mid-1980s. It was there that he learned printmaking while working in the silkscreen studio of the New Orleans Contemporary Arts Center.

Mars’ paintings incorporate the use of silkscreen or serigraphy (from the French words for "silk writing") on various mediums including wood, canvas, and paper.

In the tradition of Pop Art, mechanical repetition plays an important part in Mars’ work. He is known for completing his paintings in series, where the same image appears, each time within a slightly different context. His workis inspired by popular culture including everyday objects like old signs, billboards, match packs, TV shows, candy wrappers, and wallpaper.

Peter Mars was named an official artist of Elvis Presley Enterprises in 2008. In 2011, his exhibit ELVIS ran at the William J. Clinton Presidential Library.
