= Deaths in March 2011 =

The following is a list of notable deaths in March 2011.

Entries for each day are listed alphabetically by surname. A typical entry lists information in the following sequence:

- Name, age, country of citizenship at birth, subsequent country of citizenship (if applicable), reason for notability, cause of death (if known), and reference.

== March 2011 ==
=== 1 ===
- Barklie Lakin, 96, British industrialist (Chairman of Vickers Armstrong) and naval officer.
- Leonard Lomell, 91, American World War II veteran, recipient of the Silver Star and Purple Heart, natural causes.
- John M. Lounge, 64, American NASA astronaut (1981–1991), complications from liver cancer.
- Ion Monea, 70, Romanian Olympic silver (1968) and bronze (1960) medal-winning boxer.
- Alina Paim, 91, Brazilian novelist.
- Monath Perera, 28, Sri Lankan air force pilot, plane crash.
- Fateh Singh Rathore, 72, Indian wildlife conservationist.
- Hazel Rowley, 59, British-born Australian writer (Tête-à-tête), cerebral haemorrhage.

=== 2 ===
- Nicholas Alden, 25, American airman, shot.
- Simeonie Amagoalik, 77, Canadian carver, cancer.
- Louis Bazin, 90, French orientalist.
- Shahbaz Bhatti, 42, Pakistani politician, Minister for Minorities (since 2008), shot.
- Anthony Brooke, 98, British heir to the Sarawakan throne.
- Bernard Cywinski, 70, American architect (Apple Store), partner and co-founder of Bohlin Cywinski Jackson, cancer.
- John Haines, 86, American poet.
- Erling Kroner, 67, Danish trombonist and bandleader, cancer.
- Edward Barnes Leisenring Jr., 85, American businessman.
- Sir Allan Louisy, 94, Saint Lucian politician and judge, Prime Minister (1979–1981).
- Luis Martínez Villicaña, 71, Mexican politician, Governor of Michoacán (1986–1988), Secretary of Agrarian Reform (1982–1986).
- Ruby Muhammad, 103, American spiritual figure, lung cancer.
- Art Statuto, 85, American football player (Los Angeles Rams).
- Thor Vilhjálmsson, 85, Icelandic author, natural causes.
- Wu Jieping, 94, Chinese medical scientist and politician.

=== 3 ===
- Aldo Clementi, 85, Italian composer.
- May Cutler, 87, Canadian author and publisher, founder of Tundra Books, first female Mayor of Westmount, Quebec (1987–1991).
- Paquito Diaz, 73, Filipino actor, complications from a stroke.
- James L. Elliot, 67, American astronomer, discovered rings of Uranus.
- Lasse Eriksson, 61, Swedish comedian.
- Goga Kapoor, 70, Indian actor.
- Irena Kwiatkowska, 98, Polish actress.
- Al Morgan, 91, American novelist and television producer (The Today Show), after long illness.
- Venkatraman Radhakrishnan, 81, Indian astrophysicist, cardiac complications.
- Theron Strinden, 91, American politician.
- James Travers, 62, Canadian journalist, political correspondent (Toronto Star), editor in chief (Ottawa Citizen, 1991–1996), post-surgery complications.

=== 4 ===
- Bertil Almgren, 92, Swedish archaeologist.
- Charles F. Ashley, 74, American member of the Alabama House of Representatives (1982–1983).
- Paul Baxley, 87, American actor and stuntman (The Dukes of Hazzard, Star Trek, Kolchak: The Night Stalker).
- Krishna Prasad Bhattarai, 86, Nepali Prime Minister (1990–1991, 1999–2000), multiple organ failure.
- Mary Bowermaster, 93, American masters athletics champion.
- Frank Chirkinian, 84, American producer (CBS Sports), lung cancer.
- Annie Fargé, 76, French actress and manager, cancer.
- Vivienne Harris, 89, British businesswoman and newspaper publisher, co-founder of the Jewish Telegraph.
- Charles Jarrott, 83, British film director (Anne of the Thousand Days, Mary, Queen of Scots, Condorman), prostate cancer.
- Chester Kahapea, 65, American soil scientist, known as the "face of Hawaiian statehood", complications of Lou Gehrig's disease.
- Ed Manning, 68, American basketball player (Baltimore Bullets) and coach (San Antonio Spurs), heart condition.
- Johnny Preston, 71, American pop singer ("Running Bear"), heart failure.
- Mikhail Simonov, 81, Russian aircraft designer, chief designer of the Sukhoi Design Bureau (1983–2011), after long illness.
- Arjun Singh, 80, Indian politician, Minister of Human Resource Development (2004–2009), heart attack.
- Alenush Terian, 90, Iranian astronomer and physicist.
- María Ugarte, 97, Spanish-Dominican author, historian and journalist.
- Simon van der Meer, 85, Dutch physicist and Nobel laureate.

=== 5 ===
- Eivor Alm, 86, Swedish Olympic cross-country skier.
- Jimmy Carnes, 76, American track and field athlete, coach and administrator, cancer.
- Mario Coppola, 74, Italian nuclear physicist.
- Alberto Granado, 88, Argentine-born Cuban biochemist and writer, travel companion of Che Guevara (The Motorcycle Diaries).
- Oswald Georg Hirmer, 81, German-born South African Roman Catholic missionary, Bishop of Umtata (1997–2008).
- Manolis Rasoulis, 65, Greek singer-songwriter, author and journalist.
- Viktor Voroshilov, 84, Soviet footballer.

=== 6 ===
- Jean Bartel, 87, American actress, Miss America 1943.
- Marie-Andrée Bertrand, 85, Canadian criminologist, feminist and anti-prohibitionist.
- Patricia Brennan, 66, Australian feminist and clinician, advocate of women Anglican priests, cancer.
- Rostislav Čtvrtlík, 47, Czech stage, television and voice actor, brain tumor.
- Mike DeStefano, 44, American comedian (Last Comic Standing), heart attack.
- Jaime Felipa, 66, Netherlands Antilles judoka.
- Oddmund Jensen, 82, Norwegian Olympic cross-country skier.
- John Morton, 86, New Zealand biologist and theologian.
- Ján Popluhár, 75, Slovak footballer (1962 FIFA World Cup).
- Louie Ramsay, 81, British actress (The Ruth Rendell Mysteries).
- Reg Stewart, 85, English footballer (Colchester United), natural causes.
- Edward Ullendorff, 91, British historian.
- Frank Ziegler, 87, American football player (Philadelphia Eagles).
- Sasao Gouland, 77, governor of Chuuk State, Micronesia

=== 7 ===
- Cándido Bidó, 74, Dominican painter, cardio-respiratory failure.
- Vladimir Brazhnikov, 69, Russian football coach, myocardial infarction.
- Frank Dezelan, 80, American baseball umpire (1958–1970).
- Adrián Escudero, 83, Spanish footballer.
- Samuel Hazard Gillespie Jr., 100, American lawyer and politician, pancreatic cancer.
- Rudy Salud, 72, Filipino sports executive, PBA Commissioner (1988–1992), complications from surgery.

=== 8 ===
- Iraj Afshar, 85, Iranian bibliographer and historian.
- Víctor Manuel Blanco, 92, American astronomer, director of the Cerro Tololo Inter-American Observatory.
- Masoud Boroumand, 83, Iranian football player.
- Richard Campbell, 55, British musician.
- Herb Kawainui Kāne, 82, American artist, Hawaiian cultural advocate, participant in the Hokulea voyage.
- Moses Katjiuongua, 68, Namibian politician.
- Jim Keane, 87, American football player (Chicago Bears, Green Bay Packers).
- Omar Farouk, 72, Somali scholar and Quran interpreter.
- Steven Kroll, 69, American children's book author, surgical complications.
- St. Clair Lee, 66, American musician (The Hues Corporation), natural causes.
- Bronko Nagurski Jr., 73, American player of Canadian football (Hamilton Tiger-Cats).
- John Olmsted, 73, American naturalist and conservationist, liver cancer.
- Mike Starr, 44, American bassist (Alice in Chains, Sun Red Sun), drug overdose.

=== 9 ===
- Muftah Anaqrat, Libyan general, shot.
- Sona Aslanova, 86, Azerbaijani soprano.
- Edward Bertels, 78, Belgian footballer
- Jacques Brichant, 80, Belgian tennis player.
- David S. Broder, 81, American journalist (The Washington Post), complications from diabetes.
- Edward A. Burdick, 89, American civil servant.
- Doris Burn, 87, American children's book author and illustrator.
- Seán Cronin, 91, Irish journalist and republican, Irish Republican Army chief of staff (1957–1958, 1959–1960), after long illness.
- Armando Goyena, 88, Filipino actor.
- Valgerður Hafstað, 80, Icelandic painter.
- Andrew Hao, 95, Chinese Roman Catholic underground Bishop of Xiwanzi (since 1984).
- Bob Marcucci, 81, American talent agent, respiratory complications.
- Bob McNamara, 94, American baseball player (Philadelphia Athletics).
- Des Meagher, 67, Australian footballer (Hawthorn).
- Lindy Pearson, 82, American football player (Detroit Lions).
- Inge Sørensen, 86, Danish swimmer and Olympic bronze medalist (1936).
- Toshiko Takaezu, 88, American ceramic artist.

=== 10 ===
- Armand Bigot, 76, French Olympic equestrian.
- Bill Blackbeard, 84, American comic strip writer and editor.
- Bob Callahan, 87, American football player (Buffalo Bills).
- Nick Harbaruk, 67, Polish-born Canadian ice hockey player, bone cancer.
- Don Boven, 86, American basketball player and coach (Western Michigan University), heart disease.
- Baliram Kashyap, 74, Indian politician, MP for Bastar (since 1998), after long illness.
- Gabriel Laderman, 81, American painter, cancer,
- Danny Paton, 75, Scottish footballer.
- Emmett J. Rice, 91, American economist and banking official, heart failure.
- Eddie Snyder, 92, American composer ("Strangers in the Night", "Spanish Eyes").
- David Viñas, 83, Argentine dramatist, critic and novelist, pneumonic infection.

=== 11 ===
- David Brown, 69, British cricketer, brain tumour.
- Osvaldo Rodrigues da Cunha, 80, Brazilian paleontologist and herpetologist.
- Val ffrench Blake, 98, British army officer and author.
- Alfred Genovese, 79, American oboist, complications from cardiac arrest.
- Jack Hardy, 63, American singer-songwriter.
- Nancy Kominsky, 95, American art teacher and broadcaster.
- Hugh Martin, 96, American songwriter ("Have Yourself a Merry Little Christmas") and film composer (Meet Me in St. Louis), natural causes.
- Nick Mohammed, 85, Canadian Olympic wrestler.
- Héctor Francisco Medina Polanco, 37, Honduran television journalist, shot.
- Frank Neuhauser, 97, American patent attorney and spelling bee champion, winner of the 1925 National Spelling Bee by spelling the word "Gladiolus".
- Valter Nyström, 95, Swedish Olympic track and field athlete.
- Danny Stiles, 87, American radio host.
- Donny George Youkhanna, 60, Iraqi archaeologist, anthropologist and author, heart attack.
- Notable Japanese killed during the 2011 Tōhoku earthquake and tsunami:
  - Miki Endo, 25, voice warning and alarm agent.
  - Takashi Shimokawara, 104, masters athlete.

=== 12 ===
- Ali Hassan al-Jaber, 56, Qatari photojournalist (Al Jazeera), shot.
- Donald Brenner, 64, Canadian judge, Chief Justice of the Supreme Court of British Columbia (2000–2009).
- Bruce Campbell, 87, Canadian politician.
- Olive Dickason, 91, Canadian historian and author.
- Juan García-Santacruz Ortiz, 77, Spanish Roman Catholic prelate, Bishop of Guadix (1992–2009).
- Indrajitsinhji, 73, Indian cricketer, cancer.
- Shifra Lerer, 95, Argentinian-born American Yiddish theatre actress, stroke.
- Joe Morello, 82, American drummer (The Dave Brubeck Quartet).
- John Nettleship, 71, British teacher, inspiration for character of Severus Snape, cancer.
- Mitchell Page, 59, American baseball player (Oakland Athletics), and coach (St. Louis Cardinals, Washington Nationals).
- Nilla Pizzi, 91, Italian singer.
- Tawfik Toubi, 88, Israeli Arab politician, last surviving member of the first Knesset.

=== 13 ===
- Barbara Ball, 86, Bermudian physician, politician and social activist.
- Roy Flatt, 63, Scottish Anglican priest.
- Sir Michael Gray, 78, British army general.
- Marko Horvatin, 91, Croatian Olympic rower.
- Virginia Klinekole, 86, American politician, first female President of the Mescalero Apache.
- Brian Lanker, 63, American photojournalist, pancreatic cancer.
- Rick Martin, 59, Canadian ice hockey player (Buffalo Sabres, Los Angeles Kings), heart attack.
- Ritchie Pickett, 56, New Zealand country singer.
- David Rumelhart, 68, American psychologist, created computer simulations of neural processing, Pick's disease.
- Nicholas Smisko, 75, American clergyman, Head of the American Carpatho-Russian Orthodox Diocese (since 1984), cancer.
- Jean Smith, 82, American baseball player (All-American Girls Professional Baseball League).
- Owsley Stanley, 76, American-born Australian underground LSD chemist and sound engineer (Grateful Dead), traffic accident.
- Leo Steinberg, 90, American art historian and critic.
- Vitaly Vulf, 80, Russian theater critic and television host.

=== 14 ===
- Gerald Barry, 63, Irish journalist and broadcaster, illness.
- Alfred Baumeister, 76, American psychologist and professor.
- Todd Cerney, 57, American country musician and producer, melanoma.
- Leslie Collier, 90, British virologist.
- Joaquim Pinto Correia, 80, Portuguese politician, Governor of Macau (1986–1987).
- Bob Greaves, 76, British journalist and broadcaster, cancer.
- Jülide Gülizar, 82, Turkish anchorwoman, one of the nation's first television presenters.
- Eduard Gushchin, 70, Russian Olympic bronze medal-winning (1968) athlete.
- Big Jack Johnson, 70, American guitarist and blues singer.
- Giora Leshem, 71, Israeli poet and publisher.
- G. Alan Marlatt, 69, American professor, kidney failure.
- Larry Zolf, 76, Canadian journalist and humorist.

=== 15 ===
- José Agdamag, 89, Filipino soldier and Olympic sports shooter.
- Mirko Aksentijević, 88, Serbian journalist and basketball executive.
- Julie Apap, 62, Maltese ceramicist.
- Amos Bar, 79, Israeli author.
- Keith Fordyce, 82, British radio and television presenter (Ready Steady Go!).
- Frank Howard, 85, Canadian politician, member of the BC Legislative Assembly for Skeena (1953–1956; 1979–1986), MP for Skeena (1957–1974).
- Musa Juma, 42, Kenyan musician, pneumonia.
- Yakov Kreizberg, 51, Russian-born Austrian-American conductor.
- Jean Liedloff, 84, American writer.
- Peter Loader, 81, British cricketer.
- Marty Marion, 94, American baseball player and manager, National League MVP (1944).
- Nate Dogg, 41, American musician, stroke.
- Fred Sanford, 91, American baseball player.
- Robert Schoonjans, 85, Belgian Olympic athlete.
- Smiley Culture, 48, British reggae singer and DJ, apparent suicide by stabbing.
- Melvin Sparks, 64, American jazz and soul guitarist, heart attack.

=== 16 ===
- Abdikadir Yusuf Aar, Somalian terrorist, shot.
- Josefina Aldecoa, 85, Spanish writer and teacher, respiratory complications.
- Sándor Arnóth, 51, Hungarian politician, car accident.
- Sadiq Batcha, 47, Indian businessman and politician, suicide by hanging.
- Carel Boshoff, 83, South African religious and cultural activist, cancer.
- Betty Lowman Carey, 96, American rower.
- Tom Dunbar, 51, American baseball player (Texas Rangers).
- Al Israel, 75, American actor (Scarface, Carlito's Way, Drop Zone).
- Thomas Nkuissi, 82, Cameroonian Roman Catholic prelate, Bishop of Nkongsamba (1978–1992).
- Lloyd Oliver, 88, American veteran, World War II code talker.
- James Pritchett, 88, American actor (The Doctors).
- Lorenda Starfelt, 56, American producer, cancer.
- James C. Tyree, 53, American businessman, chairman and CEO of the Chicago Sun-Times, cancer.
- Murray Warmath, 98, American college football coach (Minnesota Golden Gophers), natural causes.
- Richard Wirthlin, 80, American political strategist and religious leader, renal failure.

=== 17 ===
- Moisis Michail Bourlas, 92, Greek Resistance veteran.
- Thongmak Chantalue, 82, Thai Mor Lam singer.
- Banny deBrum, 54, Marshallese diplomat, Ambassador to the United States (1996–2008, 2009–2011) and Canada (1999–2011).
- Michael Gough, 94, British actor (Dracula, Batman, Sleepy Hollow), Tony winner (1979), pneumonia.
- Abdel Moneim El-Guindi, 74, Egyptian Olympic bronze medal-winning (1960) boxer.
- Ferlin Husky, 85, American country music singer, heart failure.
- Don Kennard, 81, American politician, Texas State Senator (1963–1973).
- Murdoch Mitchison, 88, British zoologist.
- J.B. Steane, 83, British music critic.

=== 18 ===
- Robert Angeloch, 88, American artist.
- Princess Antoinette, Baroness of Massy, 90, Monegasque princess.
- George Bacon, 93, British physicist.
- Ze'ev Boim, 67, Israeli Knesset member, cancer.
- Enzo Cannavale, 82, Italian actor (Cinema Paradiso).
- Warren Christopher, 85, American diplomat, Secretary of State (1993–1997), complications from kidney and bladder cancer.
- Alphonse De Vreese, 89, French cyclist.
- Arthur Charles Evans, 94, British author and police officer.
- Jet Harris, 71, British musician (The Shadows), throat cancer.
- Charlie Metro, 91, American baseball player and manager (Detroit Tigers, Philadelphia Athletics), mesothelioma.
- Peter Weigand, 69, American Olympic sprint canoer.
- Kirk Wipper, 87, Canadian founder of the Canadian Canoe Museum.

=== 19 ===
- Patrick Ahern, 92, American Roman Catholic prelate, Auxiliary Bishop of New York (1970–1994).
- Kym Bonython, 90, Australian art, jazz and speedway entrepreneur.
- Guillermo Ford, 74, Panamanian politician, Vice President of Panama (1989–1994).
- Raymond Garlick, 84, British poet and editor.
- Barrington Gaynor, 45, Jamaican footballer.
- Drew Hill, 54, American football player (Los Angeles Rams, Houston Oilers, Atlanta Falcons), stroke.
- Knut, 4, German-born polar bear, drowned.
- Gustav Lantschner, 100, Austrian Olympic silver medal-winning (1936) alpine skier and actor.
- Tom McAvoy, 74, American baseball player (Washington Senators).
- Zew Wawa Morejno, 95, Polish-born American rabbi.
- Mohammed Nabbous, 28, Libyan journalist, founder of Alhurra TV, shot.
- Navin Nischol, 65, Indian actor, heart attack.
- Jim Roslof, 64, American artist (Dungeons & Dragons), cancer.
- Robert Ross, 92, American physician and medical school founder (Ross University School of Medicine and School of Veterinary Medicine), cancer.
- Bob Rush, 85, American baseball player (Chicago Cubs, Milwaukee Braves, Chicago White Sox).
- Leonard Webb, 89, British politician, Mayor of Thame (1975–1979).

=== 20 ===
- John Apacible, 38, Filipino actor (Minsan Lang Kita Iibigin), shooting.
- Don Canney, 80, American politician, Mayor of Cedar Rapids, Iowa (1969–1992), heart failure.
- Bob Christo, 72, Australian-born Indian actor, heart attack.
- Néstor de Vicente, 46, Argentine footballer, car crash.
- Oliver Humperdink, 62, American professional wrestling manager, pneumonia and cancer.
- Agostinho Januszewicz, 80, Polish-born Brazilian Roman Catholic prelate, Bishop of Luziânia (1989–2004).
- Giovanni Nesti, 88, Italian Olympic basketball player.
- Johnny Pearson, 85, British composer, arranger and pianist.
- Sara Ruddick, 76, American philosopher and author, pulmonary fibrosis.
- Dorothy Young, 103, American actress, assistant to Harry Houdini.

=== 21 ===
- Michael Abramson, 62, American artist and photographer, kidney cancer.
- Barry Ackerley, 76, American businessman (Ackerley Group), former owner of the Seattle SuperSonics, stroke.
- Nikolai Andrianov, 58, Russian gymnast, most medaled athlete at the 1976 Summer Olympics.
- Jesús Aranguren, 66, Spanish footballer and manager.
- Bruce W. Beatty, 88, Canadian graphic designer.
- Hans Boskamp, 78, Dutch actor and footballer, stroke.
- John L. Cashin Jr., 82, American civil rights campaigner, kidney failure.
- Ray Eden, 42, British cyclist, beaten.
- Mayhew Foster, 99, American brigadier general, flew captured Hermann Göring to interrogation.
- Loleatta Holloway, 64, American soul and disco musician, heart failure.
- Hansl Krönauer, 78, German folk singer and composer.
- Ladislav Novák, 79, Czech footballer.
- Pinetop Perkins, 97, American blues musician, cardiac arrest.
- Kjeld Tolstrup, 45, Danish radio disc jockey (DR P3).
- Joe Wizan, 76, Mexican-born American film producer (Jeremiah Johnson, Dunston Checks In) and studio executive (20th Century Fox).

=== 22 ===
- Artur Agostinho, 90, Portuguese sports journalist and actor.
- Nadia Barentin, 74, French actress (Les Blessures assassines).
- Victor Bouchard, 84, Canadian pianist, duettist with pianist Renée Morisset, respiratory disease.
- Patrick Doeplah, 20, Liberian footballer.
- Viljar Loor, 57, Estonian Olympic gold medal-winning (1980) volleyball player.
- Jean-Guy Morissette, 73, Canadian ice hockey player.
- Zoogz Rift, 57, American musician, painter and professional wrestler.
- Normie Roy, 82, American baseball player (Boston Braves).
- Reuven Shefer, 85, Israeli actor.
- José Soriano, 93, Peruvian football player.
- Helen Stenborg, 86, American actress (Doubt, The Bonfire of the Vanities, Isn't She Great), cancer.
- George Alfred Walker, 81, British businessman, founder of Brent Walker.

=== 23 ===
- Charles Joseph Adams, 86, American academic and professor of religion.
- José Argüelles, 72, American New Age author.
- Jean Bartik, 86, American computer programmer (ENIAC).
- Henry Jerome, 93, American big band leader, trumpeter, arranger, and composer.
- Živorad Kovačević, 80, Serbian diplomat.
- Sir Frank Lampl, 84, British businessman.
- Richard Leacock, 89, British documentary film maker (Louisiana Story, Primary, Monterey Pop, Janis).
- Teodor Negoiță, 63, Romanian polar explorer and scientist.
- Trevor Storton, 61, English footballer.
- Dame Elizabeth Taylor, 79, British-American actress (Who's Afraid of Virginia Woolf?, Giant, Cleopatra), Oscar winner (1961, 1967), heart failure.
- Fred Titmus, 78, English test cricketer.
- Fritz Tschannen, 90, Swiss accordion player and Olympic ski jumper.
- Leonard Weinglass, 78, American civil rights lawyer, pancreatic cancer.

=== 24 ===
- Helmy Afify Abd El-Bar, 88, Egyptian military commander.
- Stig Berntsson, 80, Swedish Olympic sports shooter.
- Bertrand Pernot du Breuil, 84, French Olympic equestrian.
- Julian Gbur, 68, Polish-born Ukrainian Catholic hierarch, Bishop of Stryi (since 2000).
- Hanni Gehring, 84, German Olympic cross-country skier.
- William M. Greathouse, 91, American Nazarene minister, heart failure.
- David Karimanzira, 63, Zimbabwean politician.
- Robert Knights, 79, German Olympic water polo player
- Dudley Laws, 76, Jamaican-born Canadian civil rights activist, kidney disease.
- Anselmo Müller, 79, Brazilian Roman Catholic prelate, Bishop of Januária (1984–2008).
- Gloria Valencia de Castaño, 83, Colombian television host, respiratory failure.
- Lanford Wilson, 73, American playwright.

=== 25 ===
- Floyd Bedbury, 73, American Olympic speed skater, cancer.
- Thomas Eisner, 81, American biologist, Parkinson's disease.
- Fred, South African baboon, lethal injection.
- Luis María Estrada Paetau, 75, Guatemalan Roman Catholic prelate, Vicar Apostolic of Izabal (1977–2004).
- Edwin Gaustad, 87, American religious historian.
- Maria Isakova, 92, Soviet speed skater.
- Pavel Leonov, 90, Russian naïve artist.
- Almena Lomax, 95, American journalist and civil rights activist, founder of the Los Angeles Tribune, after short illness.
- M. Blane Michael, 68, American federal judge.
- Hugo Midón, 67, Argentine theatre director and actor, after long illness.
- Thady Wyndham-Quin, 7th Earl of Dunraven and Mount-Earl, 71, Anglo-Irish aristocrat.

=== 26 ===
- Roger Abbott, 64, Canadian actor and comedian (Royal Canadian Air Farce), chronic lymphocytic leukemia.
- Joe Bageant, 64, American writer, social critic and political commentator, cancer.
- Paul Baran, 84, American Internet pioneer, complications from lung cancer.
- Alexander Barykin, 59, Russian musician, heart attack.
- Carl Bunch, 71, American drummer (Buddy Holly and the Crickets).
- Greg Centauro, 34, French pornographic actor, cardiac arrest.
- Harry Coover, 94, American inventor (Super Glue).
- Lula Côrtes, 61, Brazilian musician (Paêbirú), throat cancer.
- Cibele Dorsa, 36, Brazilian actress and writer, suicide by jumping.
- Geraldine Ferraro, 75, American politician, U.S. Representative from New York (1979–1985) and 1984 vice presidential nominee, multiple myeloma.
- František Havránek, 87, Czech football player and manager.
- Yrjö Hietanen, 83, Finnish Olympic gold medal-winning (1952) canoeist, stroke.
- Diana Wynne Jones, 76, British fantasy author (Howl's Moving Castle, Chrestomanci, Dark Lord of Derkholm), lung cancer.
- Enn Klooren, 70, Estonian actor.
- Jean-Philippe Lecat, 75, French politician.
- Kazimierz Macioch, 78, Polish Olympic wrestler
- Raymond-Marie Tchidimbo, 90, Guinean Roman Catholic prelate, Archbishop of Conakry (1962–1979).
- Robert Underwood, 76, American Negro league baseball player.
- Eric Zentner, 30, American male fashion model, traffic collision.

=== 27 ===
- Jeff Andrus, 64, American screenwriter, congestive heart failure.
- Sir Clement Arrindell, 79, Kittitian politician, Governor-General (1983–1995).
- David E. Davis, 80, American automotive writer, editor and publisher (Car and Driver, Automobile), complications from bladder surgery.
- Adolfo Donayre, 77, Peruvian footballer
- Lawrence Elion, 93, British actor.
- Farley Granger, 85, American actor (Strangers on a Train, Rope, The North Star).
- H. R. F. Keating, 84, British crime fiction writer.
- Ellen McCormack, 84, American anti-abortion activist and politician, two-time presidential candidate (1976, 1980).
- DJ Megatron, 32, American disc jockey, shot.
- Günther Mund, 76, German-born Chilean Olympic diver, plane crash.
- Dorothea Puente, 82, American serial killer, natural causes.
- George Tooker, 90, American painter, kidney failure.

=== 28 ===
- Supyan Abdullayev, 54, Chechen field commander, airstrike.
- Wenche Foss, 93, Norwegian actress, natural causes.
- Lee Hoiby, 85, American composer, metastatic melanoma.
- Sonia Osorio, 83, Colombian ballet dancer and choreographer, respiratory failure.
- Esben Storm, 60, Danish-born Australian actor, director and producer, heart attack.
- Guy M. Townsend, 90, American Air Force brigadier general and test pilot.

=== 29 ===
- José Alencar, 79, Brazilian entrepreneur and politician, Vice-President (2003–2010), multiple organ failure.
- Bob Benny, 84, Belgian singer.
- Iakovos Kambanellis, 88, Greek author, playwright, poet, lyricist and journalist, kidney failure.
- Edith Klestil, 78, Austrian first lady (1992–1998), first wife of President Thomas Klestil, cancer.
- Neil Reimer, 89, Canadian politician, Leader of the Alberta New Democratic Party (1962–1968).
- Jim Seymour, 64, American football player (Chicago Bears).
- Ângelo de Sousa, 73, Portuguese painter, sculptor, draftsman and professor, cancer.
- Alan Tang, 64, Hong Kong actor, film producer and director, stroke.
- Robert Tear, 72, British opera singer, cancer.
- Aarne Vehkonen, 83, Finnish Olympic weightlifter.
- Endre Wolf, 97, Hungarian violinist.

=== 30 ===
- Harley Allen, 55, American bluegrass and country singer, cancer.
- Jacques Amir, 78, Israeli politician.
- Roshan Atta, 71, Pakistani actress.
- Ashurbanipal Babilla, 66, Assyrian-Iranian actor, theatre director, playwright and visual artist.
- Jorge Camacho, 77, Cuban painter.
- Jack Fulk, 78, American businessman, co-founder of Bojangles' Famous Chicken 'n Biscuits.
- Tamar Golan, 76, Israeli journalist and diplomat.
- Lyudmila Gurchenko, 75, Russian film actress and singer, People's Artist of the USSR.
- Johnny Harra, 64, American actor, Elvis impersonator.
- Denis McLean, 80, New Zealand diplomat, academic, author and civil servant.
- Wally Peterson, 93, American actor, singer and stage manager.
- Nutan Prasad, 65, Indian actor, after long illness.
- Churyo Sato, 98, Japanese sculptor.
- Liaquat Soldier, 59, Pakistani comedian, heart attack.

=== 31 ===
- Sparky Adams, 93, American basketball player.
- Tony Barrell, 70, British-born Australian broadcaster and writer.
- Gil Clancy, 88, American Hall of Fame boxing trainer.
- Alan Fitzgerald, 75, Australian journalist, cancer.
- Oddvar Hansen, 89, Norwegian footballer and coach (SK Brann).
- Claudia Heill, 29, Austrian judoka, silver medalist at the 2004 Summer Olympics, suicide by jumping.
- Tom Kelleher, 85, American football official (1960–1987), complications from pneumonia.
- Vassili Kononov, 88, Russian military veteran and war criminal.
- Ishbel MacAskill, 70, Scottish Gaelic singer and heritage campaigner.
- Mel McDaniel, 68, American country music singer ("Baby's Got Her Blue Jeans On"), cancer.
- Boško Radonjić, 67, Serbian nationalist, after short illness.
- Edward Stobart, 56, British haulage contractor and entrepreneur.
- Henry Taub, 83, American entrepreneur, founder of Automatic Data Processing, leukemia.
