= Geraldo de Souza Rodrigues =

Brazilian Roman Catholic prelate (1963–2025)

His Excellency Geraldo de Souza Rodrigues
- Bishop of Januária
- Archdiocese: Montes Carlos
- Diocese: Januária
- Appointed: 25 October 2023
- Term ended: 13 April 2025
- Predecessor: José Moreira da Silva
- Successor: Vacant

Orders
- Ordination: 20 May 1988 by Oscar de Oliveira
- Consecration: 27 January 2024 by Oscar de Oliveira

Personal details
- Born: 24 October 1963 Porto Firme, Minas Gerais, Brazil
- Died: 13 April 2025 (aged 61)
- Motto: Tui sunt et eos mihi dedisti
- Coat of arms

Styles of Geraldo de Souza Rodrigues
- Reference style: His Excellency; The Most Reverend
- Spoken style: Your Excellency
- Religious style: Bishop

Geraldo de Souza Rodrigues (24 October 1963 – 13 April 2025) was a Brazilian Roman Catholic prelate. He was bishop of Januária from 2023 until his death on 13 April 2025, at the age of 61.

Catholic Church titles
Preceded by José Moreira da Silva	Bishop of Januária; 2023–2025	Succeeded by Vacant
