= Robert Underwood =

Robert Underwood may refer to:

- Robert A. Underwood (born 1948), Guamanian politician and educator
- Robert Underwood (baseball) (1934–2011), baseball player
- Robert C. Underwood (1915–1988), American jurist
