= Diocese of Janaúba =

Catholic ecclesiastical territory

Coordinates: 15.8003°S 43.3073°W

Diocese of Janaúba Dioecesis Ianaubena

Catholic
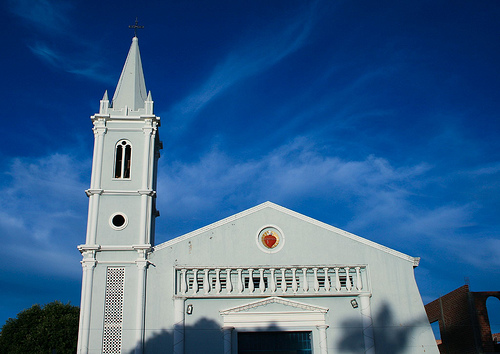
- Cathedral of the Sacred Heart of Jesus

Location
- Country: Brazil
- Ecclesiastical province: Montes Claros

Statistics
- Area: 28,975 km^{2} (11,187 sq mi)
- Population: Total; Catholics: (as of 2004); 362,400; 305,211 (84.2%)

Information
- Rite: Latin Rite
- Established: 5 July 2000 (26 years ago)
- Cathedral: Catedral Sagrado Coração de Jesus

Current leadership
- Pope: Leo XIV
- Bishop: Roberto José da Silva
- Metropolitan Archbishop: José Carlos de Souza Campos

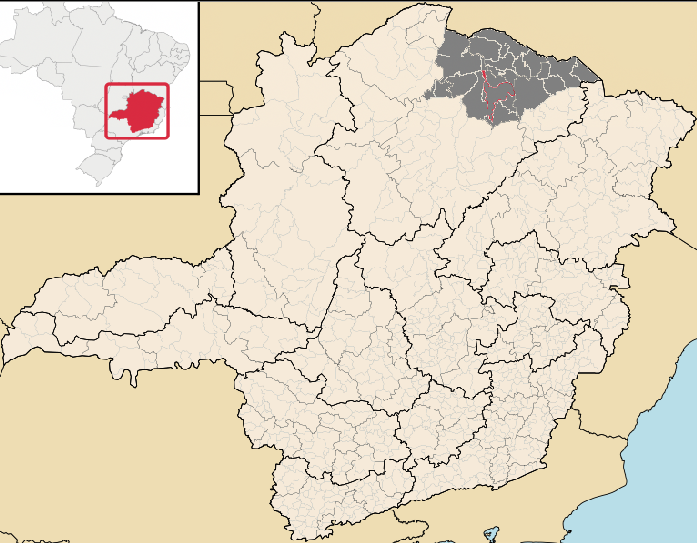
Map of the diocese.

The Roman Catholic Diocese of Janaúba (Latin: Dioecesis Ianaubena) is a diocese located in the city of Janaúba in the ecclesiastical province of Montes Claros in Brazil.

== History ==
- July 5, 2000: Established as Diocese of Janaúba from the Diocese of Januária and Diocese of Montes Claros

== Leadership ==
- Bishops of Janaúba (Roman rite), in reverse chronological order
  - Bishop Roberto José da Silva (2019.06.12 - )
  - Bishop Guerrino Riccardo Brusati (2015.05.27 - 2019.06.12)
  - Bishop José Ronaldo Ribeiro (2007.06.06 – 2014.09.24)
  - Bishop José Mauro Pereira Bastos, C.P. (2000.07.05 – 2006.04.19), appointed Bishop of Guaxupé, Minas Gerais
