= Héctor Medina =

Héctor Medina may refer to:

- Héctor Medina Polanco (1974-2011), Honduran journalist
- Héctor Medina (football player) (born 1975), retired Honduran football goalkeeper
- Héctor Medina (actor) (born 1989), Cuban theatre, television and film actor
