= Our Lady of Apparition Cathedral, Montes Claros =

Our Lady of Apparition Cathedral
- Catedral Metropolitana Nossa Senhora Aparecida
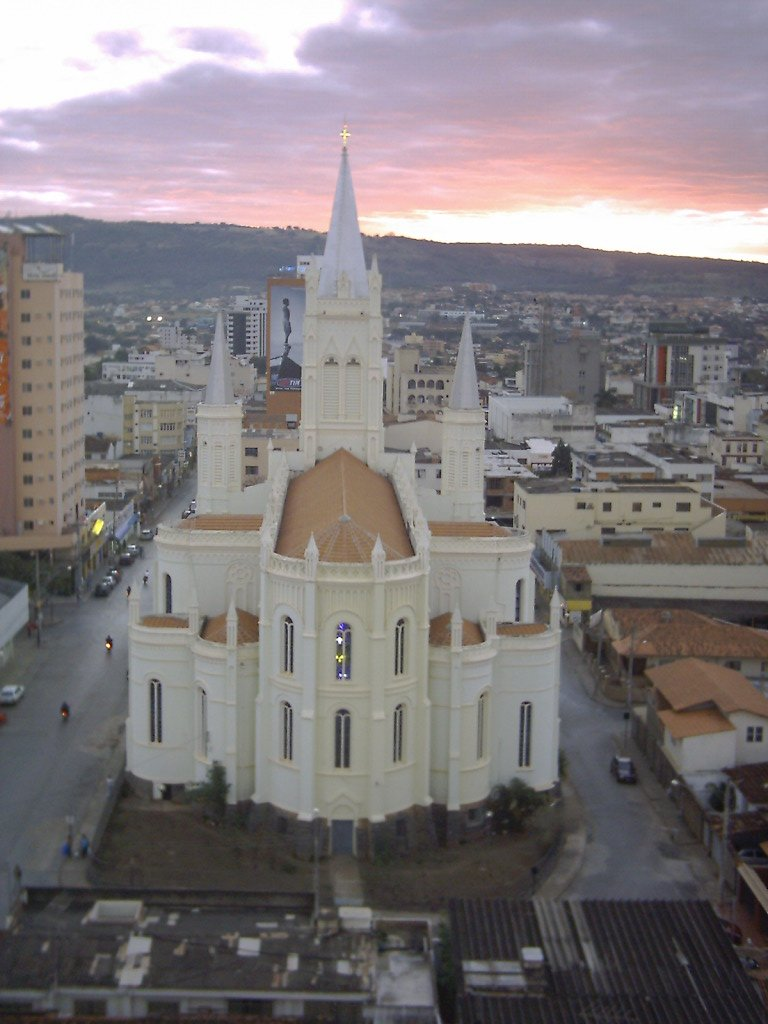
- Our Lady of Apparition Cathedral
- Location: Montes Claros
- Country: Brazil
- Denomination: Roman Catholic Church

Administration
- Archdiocese: Roman Catholic Archdiocese of Montes Claros

The Our Lady of Apparition Cathedral (Portuguese: Catedral Metropolitana Nossa Senhora Aparecida) Also Montes Claros Cathedral It is a Catholic church located in the municipality of Montes Claros, in the north of Minas Gerais, Brazil.

== Background ==
Located in Pio XII Square (Portuguese:Praça Pio XII) in the center of the city, it was built between 1926 and 1950. The project of the cathedral, of Belgian origin, came to the city between 1900 and 1905 and is a rare example of the great union of two styles: the Romanesque and the Gothic.

The parish of Our Lady of Aparecida was created on January 29, 1950, the same year of completion of the cathedral, which appears in the patrimony of the Municipality since September 28, 1999. It has three towers, with the highest Impresses by the height of 65.08 meters, the equivalent of a 20-storey building, one of the largest in Minas Gerais, with a central nave capable of holding up to 3,000 people. Today it is considered one of the most beautiful postcards of the city.

== See also ==
- Roman Catholicism in Brazil
- Our Lady of Apparition Cathedral, Cascavel
