= HMS Ursula (N59) =

British submarine

- HMS Ursula

History

United Kingdom
- Name: HMS Ursula
- Builder: Vickers Armstrong, Barrow-in-Furness
- Laid down: 19 February 1937
- Launched: 16 February 1938
- Commissioned: 20 December 1938
- Fate: Transferred to Soviet Navy, 26 June 1944
- Badge

Soviet Union
- Name: V-4
- Acquired: 26 June 1944
- Fate: Returned to UK, early 1950 and scrapped May 1950

General characteristics
- Class & type: U-class submarine
- Displacement: Surfaced – 540 tons standard, 630 tons full load; Submerged – 730 tons
- Length: 58.22 m (191 ft 0 in)
- Beam: 4.90 m (16 ft 1 in)
- Draught: 4.62 m (15 ft 2 in)
- Propulsion: 2 shaft diesel-electric; 2 Paxman Ricardo diesel generators + electric motors; 615 hp (459 kW) / 825 hp (615 kW)
- Speed: 11.25 kn (20.84 km/h; 12.95 mph) max surfaced; 10 kn (19 km/h; 12 mph) max submerged
- Complement: 27
- Armament: 4 bow internal 21 inch (533 mm) torpedo tubes, 2 external; 10 torpedoes; 3 anti-aircraft machine guns

HMS Ursula was a U-class submarine, of the first group of that class constructed for the Royal Navy. The submarine entered service in 1938 and saw action during the Second World War in the North and Mediterranean Seas.

In 1944, Ursula was transferred to the Soviet Navy and renamed V-4. She remained in Soviet service until 1950 when the submarine was returned to the United Kingdom and was sold for scrap in May 1950.

== Construction and career ==
Ursula was built by Vickers Armstrong, Barrow-in-Furness. She was laid down on 19 February 1937 and was commissioned on 20 December 1938.

At the onset of the Second World War, Ursula was a member of the 6th Submarine Flotilla. From 26-29 August 1939, the flotilla deployed to its war bases at Dundee and Blyth. Ursula started the war operating in home waters. On 9 September 1939, she fired the first British submarine torpedoes of the war when attacking the German submarine U-35. The U-boat escaped, but was sunk about two months later.

=== Attacking Leipzig ===
On 14 December 1939 Ursula was on patrol off the Elbe estuary when she sighted the German light cruiser Leipzig, escorted by six destroyers. Leipzig was returning to Kiel to undergo repairs, having been torpedoed and damaged by the submarine HMS Salmon.

In spite of the shallow waters, Ursula dived deep enough to remain undetected and close the distance to the cruiser. Upon surfacing, Ursula launched a close-range attack on Leipzig and her escorts, before diving again to escape. Ursula's commander, Lt.Cdr. G.C. Phillips, was awarded the Distinguished Service Order and promoted. Leipzig had in fact been missed and the torpedoes had instead hit F9. Leipzig reached port and underwent repair.

=== Service in the North Sea and Mediterranean ===
Ursula continued to harass enemy shipping in the North Sea, sinking the German merchant Heddernheim, before being reassigned to operate in the Mediterranean. There she sank the Italian auxiliary submarine chaser V 135 / Togo and the German merchants Sainte Marguerite II (a former French vessel) and Odysseus (the former Norwegian Gran). She also damaged the Italian merchant Sabbia, but was herself damaged by depth charges during a counter-attack by the Italian torpedo boat Generale Carlo Montanari. She also launched unsuccessful attacks against the German transport ships Brook and Tilly L.M. Russ, the Italian troop transport Vulcania and the German submarine U-73. She also attacked and damaged the Italian tanker Beppe, which had to be towed to Tripoli.

=== The 'Ursula suit' ===
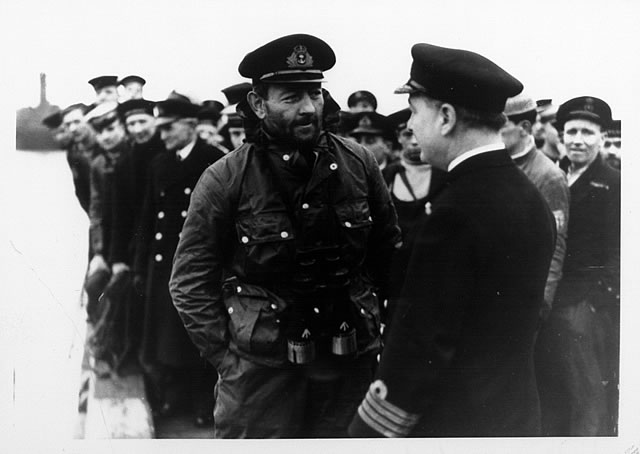
Lt Cdr Philips wearing his Ursula suit on return from the patrol during which Leipzig was attacked, 1939.

Early in the war Philips and his crew had become dissatisfied with the conventional garb of oilskins and designed a special form of clothing more suitable for submarines. Ursula's navigating officer, Lt Lakin, was a keen motorcyclist and wore a one-piece waxed cotton motorcycling suit made by Barbour. Philips asked the company to adapt the suit, splitting it into jacket and trousers and adding a hood. The suit became standard watch-keeping clothing in Royal Navy submarines.

=== Soviet service ===
Ursula was transferred on loan to the Soviet Union on 26 June 1944. She was renamed V-4 "Soviet Svanetia" by the Soviets after a mountainous province in Georgia where the submarine's new commander Yaroslav Iosseliani came from. On 20 October 1944 she sank the German submarine chaser UJ-1219. She survived the war, was returned to Britain in early 1950, and scrapped at Grangemouth in May 1950.

== Sources ==
- Colledge, J. J.; Warlow, Ben (2006) [1969]. Ships of the Royal Navy: The Complete Record of All Fighting Ships of the Royal Navy from the 15th Century to the Present (3rd Rev ed.). London: Chatham Publishing. ISBN 978-1-86176-281-8. OCLC 67375475.
- Hutchinson, Robert (2001). Jane's Submarines: War Beneath the Waves from 1776 to the Present Day. London: HarperCollins. ISBN 978-0-00-710558-8. OCLC 53783010.
- Rohwer, Jürgen (2005). Chronology of the War at Sea 1939–1945: The Naval History of World War Two (Revised & Expanded ed.). Annapolis, Maryland: Naval Institute Press. ISBN 1-59114-119-2.
