= This Is Elvis =

1981 film by Andrew Solt

- Theatrical release poster
- Directed by: Malcolm Leo; Andrew Solt
- Written by: Malcolm Leo; Andrew Solt
- Produced by: David L. Wolper
- Narrated by: Ral Donner
- Cinematography: Gil Hubbs
- Edited by: Glenn Farr
- Music by: Walter Scharf
- Distributed by: Warner Bros.
- Release date: April 4, 1981
- Running time: 100 minutes
- Country: United States
- Language: English
- Box office: $2 million (US)

This Is Elvis is a 1981 American documentary film about the life of Elvis Presley, written and directed by Andrew Solt and Malcolm Leo. It combines archival footage with reenactments, and voice-over narration by pop singer Ral Donner, imitating Presley's speaking voice. It was screened out of competition at the 1981 Cannes Film Festival. The film grossed $2 million at the box office in the U.S. and Canada, ranking #92 for 1981.

== Cast and content ==
For the reenactment scenes, Presley was portrayed in the film by four actors:

- Paul Boensch II as Presley at age 11 (Tupelo, Mississippi, in 1946)
- David Scott as Presley at age 18 (Memphis in 1953, singing in high school, and at a Sun recording session; vocals by David Scott)
- Dana MacKay as Presley at age 35
- Johnny Harra as Presley at age 42 (Opening credits, August 16, 1977, death scene from extended version)

Other narrators provided voice-over narrations for Vernon Presley, Gladys Presley, and Priscilla Presley. Presley's former road manager Joe Esposito and girlfriend Linda Thompson provided their own narrations. Presley receives credit only in the extended version prepared for cable and later home video release.

== Reception ==
In a contemporary review, Variety wrote, "A real curiosity item, This Is Elvis is a fast-paced gloss on Presley's life and career packed with enough fine music and unusual footage to satisfy anyone with an interest in the late singing idol."

== Legacy ==
A two-disc DVD set of the film was released on August 7, 2007, commemorating the 30th anniversary of Presley's death. Disc one features the original version shown in theaters, and disc two includes the extended version with 45 extra minutes of footage.

This Is Elvis was the only Presley movie produced and released by Warner Bros., until Baz Luhrmann’s biopic Elvis in 2022. Warner Bros. also currently owns other titles with Presley via purchasing Turner Entertainment, including Presley's Metro-Goldwyn-Mayer films and National General Pictures' Charro!.

== Soundtrack ==
RCA Records released the soundtrack as a double LP album from the film in March 1981, featuring the first official release of several of Presley's 1950s television appearances as well as other previously unreleased performances. The soundtrack album was certified Gold on August 6, 2002 by the RIAA.

This Is Elvis (Soundtrack)

Compilation album by Elvis Presley
- Released: March 1981
- Genre: Rock and roll
- Label: RCA
- Producers: Danny Gould and Joan Deary (compilation producers)

Elvis Presley chronology
Guitar Man (1981)	This Is Elvis (Soundtrack) (1981)	Elvis: Greatest Hits Volume 1 (1981)

=== Track listing ===
Disc one:

1. "(Marie's the Name) His Latest Flame"
2. "Moody Blue"
3. "That's All Right"
4. "Shake, Rattle, and Roll/Flip, Flop, and Fly" (live January 28, 1956 - overdubbed)
5. "Heartbreak Hotel" (live March 17, 1956 - overdubbed)
6. "Hound Dog" (live May 6, 1956 - overdubbed)
7. "Excerpt from Hy Gardner Interview"
8. "My Baby Left Me"
9. "Merry Christmas Baby" (overdubbed - edited)
10. "Mean Woman Blues" (movie version)
11. "Don't Be Cruel" (live January 6, 1957 - overdubbed)
12. "(Let Me Be Your) Teddy Bear"
13. "Jailhouse Rock"
14. "Army Swearing In"
15. "G.I. Blues"
16. "Excerpt from Elvis Sails"
17. "Excerpt from 'Home from Germany'"

Disc two:

1. "Too Much Monkey Business" (edit)
2. "Love Me Tender"
3. "I've Got A Thing About You Baby"
4. "I Need Your Love Tonight"
5. "Blue Suede Shoes" (splice of live June 27, 1968 and June 29, 1968)
6. "Viva Las Vegas" (mono)
7. "Suspicious Minds" (live January 14, 1973 - edited)
8. "Excerpt from Jaycees Awards"
9. "Promised Land" (edited - with harmony vocal overdub restored)
10. "Excerpt from Madison Square Garden Press Conference"
11. "Always on My Mind" (March 30, 1972 "Mock" Studio Session - edited and overdubbed)
12. "Are You Lonesome Tonight?" (live June 21, 1977) (from Elvis in Concert)
13. "My Way" (live June 21, 1977) (from Elvis In Concert)
14. "An American Trilogy" (live April 9, 1972, with additional overdubbed strings)
15. "Memories" (stereo - edited)

=== Charts ===
Chart (1982)	Peak position
Australia (Kent Music Report)	84
