= Rostislav Čtvrtlík =

Czech actor

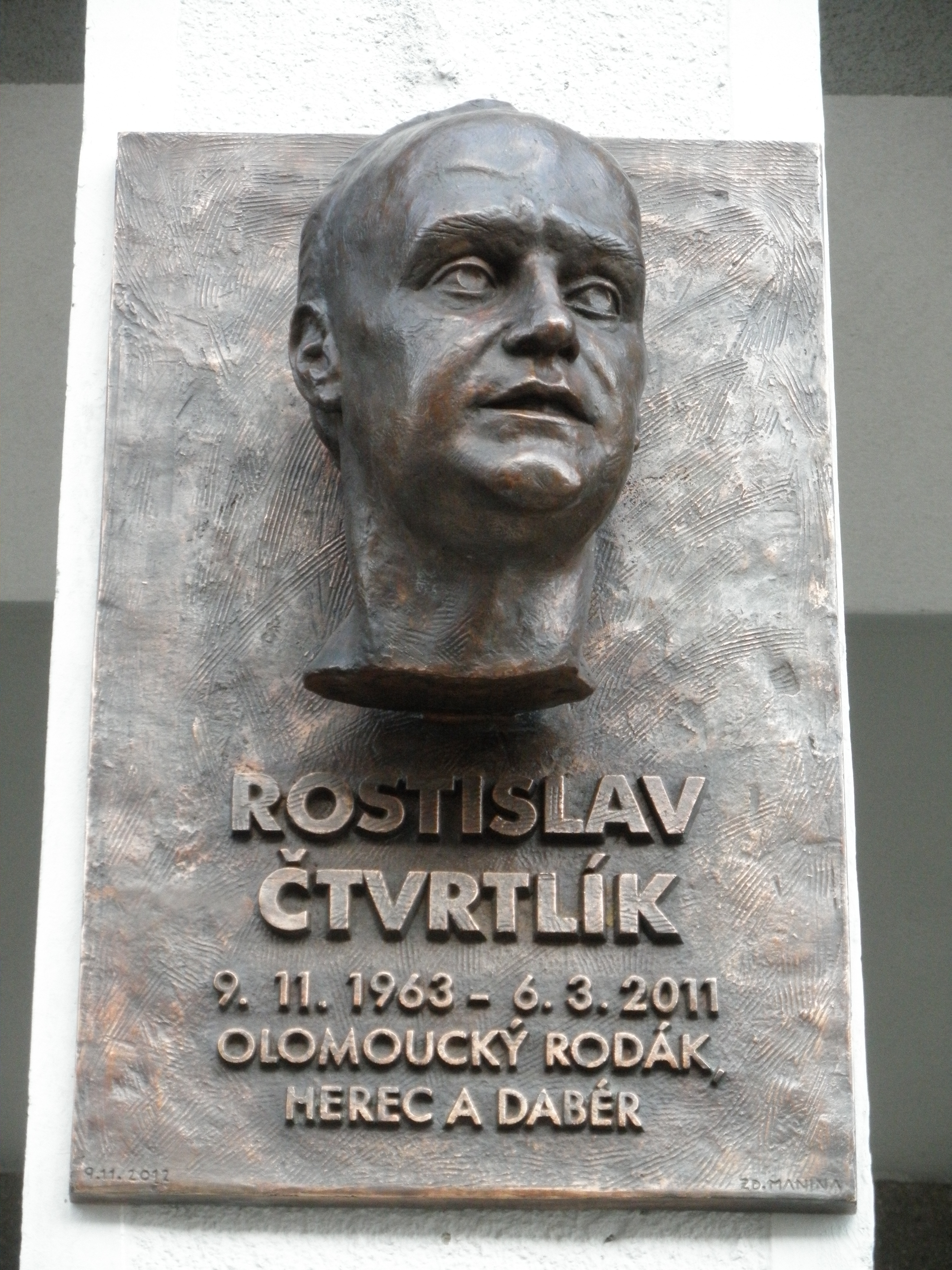
Memorial plaque and a bust of Rostislav Čtvrtlík in Olomouc, the Czech Republic. The bust was made by Zdeněk Manina in 2012. There is written on the plaque in Czech: Rostislav Čtvrtlík: 9. 11. 1963 – 6. 3. 2011; a native of Olomouc, actor and voice actor.

Rostislav Čtvrtlík (9 November 1963 – 6 March 2011) was a Czech stage, television and voice actor. He was the Czech voice of Matthew Perry in Friends and other TV shows and movies.

== Biography ==
Čtvrtlík was born in Olomouc in 1963. He attended school in Lipník nad Bečvou before moving to Prague, where he studied acting at the Faculty of Theatre. Čtvrtlík started working at the Divadlo pod Palmovkou in 1992, and continued his association with the theatre until his death. His role as Lennie in the play Of Mice and Men at Divadlo pod Palmovka was among Čtvrtlík's most known roles, as the play was performed over 300 times. As a voice actor, Čtvrtlík dubbed the voice of Matthew Perry's character Chandler Bing in the American television sitcom Friends. Čtvrtlík died in March 2011 after a 12-year illness.

== Filmography ==
- "Kriminálka Anděl" (2008) (TV series) ... (episode ???)
- "Škola Na Výsluní" (2006) (TV series) ... teacher
- Zlá minuta (2005) (TV) ...
- Otec neznámý (2001) (TV) ...
- "Četnické humoresky" (1997) (TV series) ...
- "Motel Anathema" (1997) (TV series) ...
- Úsvit (1997) ...
- "Kde padají hvězdy" (1996) (TV series) ... (episode)
- Případ černých vzadu (1992) (TV) ...
- Černá Fortuna (1991) (TV) ...
- Přílíš mnoho dobrých úmyslů (1991) (TV) ...
- "Rodáci" (1988) (TV series) ...

== Theatre ==
Full member of Divadlo pod Palmovkou since 1992.

- Hamlet ... Leartes
- Sicilská tradice ... Tralala (Pirandello)
- Kouzelník z Lublin ... Jaša
- Vojcek ... Vojcek
- Life is a Dream ... Astolfo
- Amadeus ... Josef II.
- Výstřely na Broadwayi ... Cheech (Woody Allen)
- Konkurenti ... Dave Moss (David Mamet)
- Of Mice and Men ... Lennie
- Ubohý vrah|Poky Killer ... Third actor (Pavel Kohout)
- Caligula ... Cherea
- Oidipus ruler ... Kreon
- Ještě jednou, profesore ... Ota (Antonín Procházka)
- The Tempest ... Caliban, Savage, Slave (William Shakespeare)
- Gazdina roba ... Samko Jagoš (Gabriela Preissová)
- Sliby chyby ... Doctor Dreyfus (Neil Simon, Burt Bacharach, Hal David)
- Viva La Queen... John Knox (R. Bolt)
- One Flew Over the Cuckoo's Nest ... Chief Bromdem
- Pozor, jaguar ... Brad (Nathaniel Richard Nash)
- Nájemnící pana Swana ... Dr. Chapman (Michael Cooney)
