= Michael Abramson =

American photographer (1948-2011)

Michael L. Abramson
- Born: Michael L. Abramson; October 11, 1948; Newark, New Jersey, United States
- Died: March 21, 2011 (aged 62); Chicago, Illinois, United States
- Website: Official website

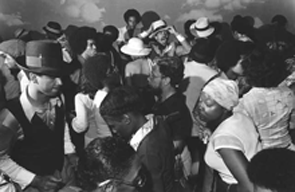
Dance Scene at Perv's House; Photo taken during the mid-1970s on Chicago's South side.

Michael L. Abramson (October 11, 1948 – March 21, 2011) was a Chicago photographer who produced a large body of artistic and commercial photography.

== Life ==
Born in Newark, New Jersey, Abramson grew up in South Orange, New Jersey, and graduated from Columbia High School in Maplewood. He earned a bachelor's degree from the Wharton School of Business in Philadelphia, but his life took a different turn when he was accepted at the Institute of Design at the Illinois Institute of Technology in Chicago, where he earned a master's degree in 1977. His thesis, "Black Night Clubs of Chicago's South Side," was a reflection and analysis of the photographs he took of patrons and performers in multiple nightclubs on Chicago's south side during the mid-1970s. Abramson's images have often been compared to those of the photographer Brassaï (1899–1984), who captured Paris by night in the 1920s.

Abramson decided to stay in Chicago, where for two years following graduation he taught photography as a part-time instructor. He quickly realized that teaching was not his calling, but subsequently found satisfaction in freelance photography. Throughout his long career, his assignments increasingly came from national news publications, such as Time, Forbes, Newsweek, Business Week, Fortune, & Bloomberg. Notable subjects included Steven Spielberg, Michael Jordan, Ron Howard, Oprah Winfrey, Donald Rumsfeld, Louis Farrakhan, Bill Clinton, and Steve Jobs. Today his commercial work is managed by Getty Images.

Abramson had two brief marriages, both ending in divorce within two years. In 1999, he began dating DePaul Professor Midge Wilson, and the two continued their relationship until Abramson's death from cancer on March 21, 2011. Abramson stipulated in his will that Wilson preserve his vintage photographs and act to insure his legacy.

== Publications ==
Abramson's south side prints were first published by the Chicago-based music recording company Numero Group. Their 2 LP/photography book package was entitled Light on the South (2009), and included over 100 of Abramson's South side photographs, along with two LPs of blues songs specifically selected to reflect what was likely playing on the jukeboxes in the clubs where Michael worked. To promote the package, Numero Group produced a multimedia slideshow on YouTube. This unique release, Light on the South Side, was nominated in 2010 for a Grammy in the category of Best Boxed Or Special Limited Edition Package. Light on the South Side was also a nominee for the English MOJO Awards.

Light on the South Side was not the first time Abramson's work could be found in book form. Following graduation, he and former classmate and business partner, Kathleen Aguilar, were hired to take photos of the Thorne Rooms, one of the most popular exhibits at the Art Institute of Chicago. The book, The Thorne Miniature Rooms of the Art Institute of Chicago was released in 1984, with a second edition in 2005.

Several postmortem books showcasing Abramson's south side images followed, including the solo-artist publication Gotta Go Gotta Flow: Life, Love, and Lust From Chicago's South Side (2015), with accompanying slam poetry by acclaimed author Patricia Smith. Collected works A Lasting Vision: Photographs From the Institute of Design 1970-2001 (2015), and Chicago Classic Photographers (2017), featured Abramson's south side images, as well.

A lesser known portfolio is Camera Night, so named for the semi-monthly events held during the 1970s at strip clubs during which amateur photographers would be invited in before evening shows began to take shots of the performers getting ready. Michael took a different tack by turning his lens on the gobsmacked photographers. These provocative images can be found in Men Looking at Women in the 70s, released by Hoxton Mini-Press in 2017.

== Exhibitions and Museums ==
Since 2011, Abramson's South side images have been displayed at multiple galleries and museums, including the Museum of Contemporary Photography in Chicago (2014), Fotographie Forum in Frankfurt, Germany (2017), Benhadj-Djilali Gallerie in Berlin (2018), MMX Gallery in London (2018), Blue Sky Gallery in Portland, Oregon (2018), Candela Unbound! Gallery in Richmond, Virginia (2018), and at The Rangefinder Gallery in Chicago (2019)

Today Abramson's photographs are archived in permanent collections at the Smithsonian, Art Institute of Chicago, California Museum of Photography, Chicago History Museum, and the Milwaukee Art Museum.
