= Geraldo Majela de Castro =

Brazilian Roman Catholic archbishop

Geraldo Majela de Castro O.Praem
- Archbishop of Montes Claros
- Church: Catholic Church
- Archdiocese: Archdiocese of Montes Claros
- In office: 1 June 1988 – 7 February 2007
- Predecessor: José Alves de Sá Trindade
- Successor: José Alberto Moura
- Previous post: Coadjutor Bishop of Montes Claros (1982-1988)

Orders
- Ordination: 8 December 1953
- Consecration: 8 September 1982 by José Alves de Sá Trindade

Personal details
- Born: 24 June 1930 Montes Claros, Minas Gerais, Republic of the United States of Brazil
- Died: 14 May 2015 (aged 84)

Geraldo Majela de Castro (24 June 1930 – 14 May 2015) was a Roman Catholic archbishop.

Ordained to the priesthood in 1953, de Castro was named coadjutor of the Diocese of Montes Claros, Brazil in 1982 and became bishop of the diocese in 1988. In 2001 the Montes Claros diocese became an archdiocese. de Castro retired in 2007.
