= Robert Angeloch =

American painter

- Photo by Dion Ogust
- Born: April 8, 1922; New York City, US
- Died: March 11, 2011 (aged 88)
- Movement: Art Students League of New York

Robert H. Angeloch (April 8, 1922 - March 18, 2011) was an American artist, and co-founder of the Woodstock School of Art.

== Life ==
Robert Angeloch was born in Richmond Hill, New York, April 8, 1922, to Frederick and Laura Scherer Angeloch. He served in World War II in the United States Army Air Corps|. From 1946 to 1951 he studied at the Art Students League of New York with Martin Lewis, Yasuo Kuniyoshi and others. He also studied at the Academy of Fine Arts, Florence, Italy and privately with Fiske Boyd in New Hampshire. While a League student he won the McDowell Traveling Scholarship and visited France, Italy, Austria and England.

His prints and drawings have been included in exhibitions at the Metropolitan Museum of Modern Art, the Library of Congress, the Society of American Graphic Artists, the Museum of Modern art, the Wichita Print Annual, the Society of Washington Printmakers and elsewhere.

He was artist in residence at Western Kentucky University in 1974 under a grant from the National Endowment for the Arts. He taught at the Art Students League of New York from 1964 to 1979 and from 1968 to 2003 at the Woodstock School of Art of which he was a co-founder. In 2012, Woodstock School of Art, held a retrospective curated by his son, Eric, a painter in his own right.

He died on March 18, 2011.
