= Chester Kahapea =

American soil scientist

Chester Frank Kahapea (March 14, 1945 – March 4, 2011) was an American soil scientist, technician and former paperboy. Kahapea became a symbol of the Hawaiian statehood after an iconic photo of him appeared in newspapers around the United States holding a special edition copy of the Honolulu Star-Bulletin headlined "Statehood." Kahapea became known in state history as "the face of Hawaii statehood."

The photo of Kahapea was taken on March 12, 1959, shortly after U.S. President Dwight Eisenhower signed the Hawaii Admission Act, admitting Hawaii as the 50th U.S. state. Kahapea was a twelve-year-old paperboy in Honolulu at the time. People had taken to the streets to celebrate Hawaii's admission to the U.S. and Kahapea reportedly could not keep up with the demand for the special edition Honolulu Star-Bulletin statehood newspapers. Kahapea was selected as the newsboy to hand the first statehood newspaper to then Honolulu Mayor Neal Blaisdell, who was late for the photographer's appointment. With the Mayor late, the reporter began talking to Kahapea, which led to the now famous photograph. In 2009, on the fiftieth anniversary of statehood, Kahapea recalled the instance when an Associated Press reporter took the now iconic photograph, "He just asked me how I normally sold my papers. So, I held up my hand with the paper - and, just a shot of statehood - and that was it!" The photo of Kahapea holding a "Statehood" special edition appeared in newspapers and publications worldwide, including The New York Times. The photograph made Kahapea a symbol of Hawaii's achievement of statehood.

Kahapea become a soil technician for Construction Engineering Labs, testing the quality and composition of soil, cement and asphalt. where he worked for thirty-one years before retiring.

In 2008, Kahapea was diagnosed with Lou Gehrig's disease, but acted as a spokesman and activist for those suffering from the disease in Hawaii. He worked to spread awareness of the disease in the state. Kahapea died of complications from Lou Gehrig's disease at Kuakini Medical Center in Honolulu on March 4, 2011, at the age of 65. He was a longtime resident of Waianae, Oahu. He was survived by three children - Christopher, Jeffrey and Nadine. His memorial service was held at the Nuuanu Memorial Park and Mortuary on March 26, 2011.
