= Jack Fulk =

American businessman (1932–2011)

- Born: Jack Zimmerman Fulk; November 30, 1932; Davidson County, North Carolina
- Died: March 30, 2011 (aged 78); Charlotte, North Carolina
- Occupation: Businessman

Jack Z. Fulk (November 30, 1932 – March 30, 2011) was an American businessman who co-founded the Bojangles fast food restaurant chain in 1977 in Charlotte, North Carolina.

== Life ==
Fulk was born to Charles and Lucille Hunter Fulk in Davidson County, North Carolina, on November 30, 1932.

Fulk initially operated a Hardee's franchise in Wilkesboro, North Carolina. While still working with Hardee's, Fulk began experimenting with recipes for biscuits during the mid-1970s. In 1977, Fulk and his business partner, Richard Thomas, opened a chicken restaurant that became the first Bojangles' Famous Chicken 'n Biscuits on West Boulevard in Charlotte, North Carolina. The first restaurant was a walk-in with no seating, but it specialized in chicken that was spicier than its competitors. Fulk also added his biscuits to the restaurant's menu, which increased sales approximately 60%. Fulk and Thomas opened a second Bojangles' Famous Chicken 'n Biscuits in 1978.

Fulk retired from Bojangles in 1985, when the chain had reached 350 locations (there were more than 500 locations in eleven states, as of 2011). He eventually sold his stake in Bojangles, but continued to operate a franchise in Jonesville, North Carolina.

Fulk died on March 30, 2011, at the age of 78.
