= Ray Eden =

British cyclist (1968–2011)

Personal information
- Full name: Raymond Eden
- Born: 1968 United Kingdom
- Died: 21 March 2011 (aged 42–43)

Cycling career
- Sport: Cycling
- Discipline: Road
- Role: Rider

Major wins
- RTTC National 100-mile Championship

Ray Eden (1968 – 21 March 2011) was a British professional road cyclist. He is best known as the winner of the RTTC National 100-mile Championship in 1995, which he achieved at only his second attempt. He placed second in the event in 1994. Eden also represented Great Britain four times in 1995, including in the Irish Ras stage race in which he won a stage and the points jersey.

Eden joined Rotherham cycle maker Planet X in 1995 and worked there until his death.

== Death ==
Eden died at Doncaster Royal Infirmary on 21 March 2011, having sustained serious head injuries in an incident near his home three days before. A man was subsequently charged with inflicting grievous bodily harm on Eden, and was jailed for manslaughter on 12 August 2011.
