= Hazel Rowley =

Australian writer

- Born: Hazel Joan Rowley; 16 November 1951; London, England, UK
- Died: 1 March 2011 (aged 59); New York City, New York, US
- Education: University of Adelaide
- Writing career
- Language: English, French
- Genre: Biography
- Notable work: Tête-à-tête (2005)
- Notable awards: 1994 NBC Banjo Award for Non-Fiction
- Website: www.hazelrowley.com

Hazel Joan Rowley (16 November 1951 – 1 March 2011) was a British-born Australian author and biographer.

== Life ==
Born in London, Rowley emigrated with her parents to Adelaide at the age of eight. She studied at the University of Adelaide, graduating with Honours in French and German. Later she acquired a PhD in French. She taught literary studies at Deakin University in Melbourne, before moving to the United States.

Rowley's first published biography, of Australian novelist Christina Stead, was critically acclaimed and won the National Book Council's "Banjo" Award for non-fiction in 1994. It was shortlisted for the 1993 Colin Roderick Award. Her next biographical work was about the African American writer Richard Wright. Her best-known book, Tête-à-tête (2005), covers the lives of Simone de Beauvoir and Jean-Paul Sartre (de Beauvoir had been the subject of Rowley's PhD thesis). Her last published book is Franklin & Eleanor: An Extraordinary Marriage, about Franklin and Eleanor Roosevelt (2011).

Rowley suffered a cerebral hemorrhage in New York in February 2011 and died there on 1 March, aged 59.

== Legacy ==
The annual Hazel Rowley Literary Fellowship was set up in her memory in 2011, with Mary Hoban the inaugural winner in 2012.

== Bibliography ==
- Christina Stead: A Biography (1994)
- Richard Wright: The Life and Times (2001)
- Tête-à-tête: The Lives and Loves of Simone de Beauvoir & Jean-Paul Sartre (2005)
- Franklin & Eleanor: An Extraordinary Marriage (2010)
