= Divadlo pod Palmovkou =

Theatre in Prague, Czechia

Palmovka Theatre
- Divadlo pod Palmovkou
- Theatre S. K. Neumann
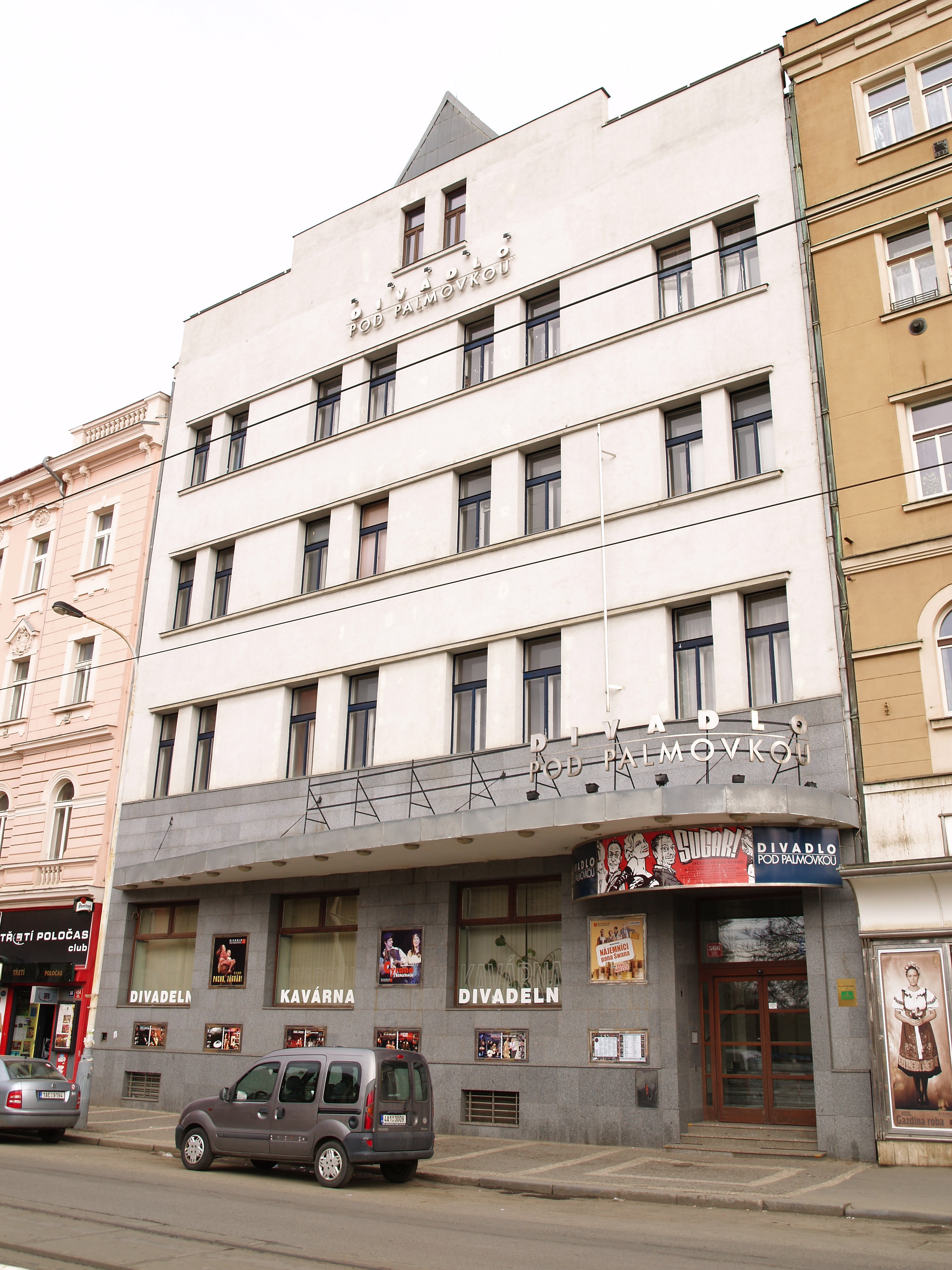
- Palmovka Theatre
- Interactive map of Palmovka Theatre
- Address: Zenklova 566; Prague 8 Czech Republic
- Coordinates: 50°6′19.82″N 14°28′23.29″E

Construction
- Opened: 1892

Website
- Official website

Palmovka Theatre (Czech: Divadlo pod Palmovkou), also known as the Theatre S. K. Neumann and the Urban and Regional Theatre, is a classic drama theatre located in the Prague district of Libeň at the bottom of Zenklova street in Prague near the intersection and subway station Palmovka. In addition to the main stage it has the attic theatre, a small studio theatre for more intimate performances.

== History ==
There has been a theatre on the site since 1865 but the current theatre company only dates to August 1949, when under the direction of the minister for Culture the current troupe took form. Until 1992 the Libeň theatre bore the name of the S. K. Neumann Theatre, but with the fall of communism the theatre took its current name.
