= Hansl Krönauer =

German singer and composer (1932–2011)

Hansl Krönauer (23 April 1932 in Benediktbeuern – 21 March 2011) was a German folk-singer and composer.

His career started around 1955 when he performed typical Bavarian music. In 1970, he had his first and biggest success Golden schimmern meine Berge, a Number-1-Hit for three months in German folk-charts Lustige Musikanten. In 1971, Golden schimmern meine Berge was elected the most popular German folk-song of the year. Other successful titles followed until 1990.

He later ran a restaurant in Benediktbeuern. He was married and had a daughter who is also a singer.

== Selected discography ==
- "Golden schimmern meine Berge" (1970)
- "Sohn der herrlichen Berge" (1971)
- "Westerwald, wie bist du schön" (1977)
- "Der König und die Sennerin" (1984)
- "Fremde Erde" (1986)
- "Die allerschönste Mundart" (1987)
- "Das Mutterlied" (1990)
