= Barklie Lakin =

British industrialist and officer in the Royal Navy

- Born: 8 October 1914
- Died: 1 March 2011 (aged 96)
- Military career
- Allegiance: United Kingdom
- Branch: Royal Navy
- Service years: 1932–1946
- Rank: Lieutenant Commander
- Units: HMS Ursula; HMS Safari
- Conflicts: Second World War
- Awards: Distinguished Service Order; Distinguished Service Cross & Bar; Legion of Merit (USA)

Richard Barklie Lakin, DSO, DSC & Bar (8 October 1914 – 1 March 2011) was a British industrialist, chairman of Vickers Armstrong and an officer in the Royal Navy during the Second World War.

== Life ==
As an 8 year old child, Lakin survived a car accident in France which claimed the life of his father, Edward Lyon Lakin. He graduated from Britannia Royal Naval College in Dartmouth in 1932 and joined the cruiser HMS Sussex. He transferred to submarines, initially joining HMS Narwhal and in 1938 HMS Ursula as navigating officer. He was due to transfer to the new submarine HMS Thetis but this appointment was cancelled before her loss in an accident on 1 June 1939.

On the outbreak of war Lakin transferred to HMS H32 and was mentioned in dispatches. He then transferred to HMS Utmost in November 1940 serving in the Mediterranean. A successful series of patrols which sank Italian supply ships and landed or recovered agents on three occasions resulted in the award of Lakin's first Distinguished Service Cross. Returning to Britain, Lakin was given command of HMS H43 in December 1941 and was then given command of Ursula in March 1942. HMS Ursula was based in Malta as part of the 10th submarine squadron which was charged with interdicting Axis supply convoys to North Africa. Lakin took part in several patrols including support for Operation Torch when submarines acted like lighthouses on the water's surface to guide in the Allied invasion fleet. Ursula then sunk a U-boat near Barcelona that was three miles away.

In February 1943 Ursula was situated off the west coast of Sicily attacking Rommel's supply ships between Naples and Tripoli. Although successful, Ursula was hit by a German merchant ship which rode over her damaging both periscopes and the bridge but missing the conning tower. She had to limp back to friendly port of Algiers in order to be patched up by 8th Flotilla Depot Ship HMS Maidstone a journey which took six days. He was awarded the Distinguished Service Order'for bravery and skill in successful submarine patrols' in the Mediterranean.

Lakin was given command of the S-class submarine HMS Safari in April 1943. It was responsible for the destruction of 40 vessels in the Mediterranean totalling 50,000 tons . In October 1943, Lakin was awarded a bar to his DSO for 'outstanding skill and bravery during five submarine patrols and for utter fearlessness when sinking enemy supply ships in the face of enemy surface and shore battery gunfire.' During these five patrols with Safari, he made a bold moonlight attack on a large size vessel which was sunk.

Safari also acted as a navigation beacon for US forces during the Invasion of Sicily for which Lakin was awarded the Legion of Merit in November 1943. It was presented to him in 1944 by Admiral Harold R Stark, Commander of US naval forces in Europe for 'outstanding services to the US Government during the assault on Sicily'.

Lakin's final naval mission was to look after surrendered U-boats in Derry, Northern Ireland at the end of the war.

Lakin joined Vickers-Armstrongs in 1946 as an engineer before progressing to become managing director of Armaments Division and Chairman of Elswick Works, a local board of Vickers. He later became chairman and chief executive officer. In 1956 he was based in Egypt and was interned by the Egyptian authorities during the Suez Crisis. He was also chairman of the Confederation of British Industry (Northern Division) in 1969.

== Family ==
Lakin married twice; his first wife Pamela Jackson-Taylor died in 1981. His second wife Pansy Philips also pre-deceased him. He was survived by his long term companion Joy Almond, and his three sons and three daughters from his first marriage.
