= Tête-à-tête (book) =

2006 book about Simone de Beauvoir and Jean-Paul Sartre

- Author: Hazel Rowley
- Language: French
- Subject: Jean-Paul Sartre, Simone de Beauvoir Biography
- Genre: non-fiction
- Publisher: Chatto & Windus, HarperCollins
- Publication date: 5 Jan 2006
- Publication place: France
- English publication date: 17 Oct 2006
- Media type: Print (hardback, paperback), eBook
- Pages: 448 pp
- ISBN: 0-7011-7508-7

Tête-à-tête is a 2006 non-fiction book by Hazel Rowley about the lives of Jean-Paul Sartre and Simone de Beauvoir. It was a bestseller in Brazil.

== Awards and nominations ==
In 2006, the editors of Lire magazine included it in a list of the twenty best books written in French of that year.

== See also ==
Axel Madsen
