= Alfred Genovese =

Alfred Genovese (April 25, 1931 – March 11, 2011) was principal oboe of both the Boston Symphony Orchestra and the Metropolitan Opera Orchestra.

Genovese was born on April 25, 1931, in Philadelphia. He began his study of the oboe at age 16 with John Minsker, then English hornist of the Philadelphia Orchestra, and continued with world-renowned oboist Marcel Tabuteau at the Curtis Institute of Music in Philadelphia. In 1953 he joined the Baltimore Symphony Orchestra. He was principal oboe of the St. Louis Symphony Orchestra from 1956 to 1959, and then played for a season in the Cleveland Orchestra under George Szell while oboist Marc Lifschey was playing in the Metropolitan Opera Orchestra.

Genovese served as principal oboe of the Metropolitan Opera Orchestra from 1960 to 1977. He then joined the Boston Symphony Orchestra as associate principal oboe, 1977 to 1987, and thereafter as principal oboe from 1987 until his retirement in 1998.

Genovese performed at the Marlboro Festival with Rudolf Serkin, and also played at the Casals Festival in Puerto Rico for many years beginning in the mid-1950s. He taught at New England Conservatory and Boston University.

Genovese died in Philadelphia on March 11, 2011, after a debilitating series of lung infections and complications from two heart attacks.
