= Johnny Harra =

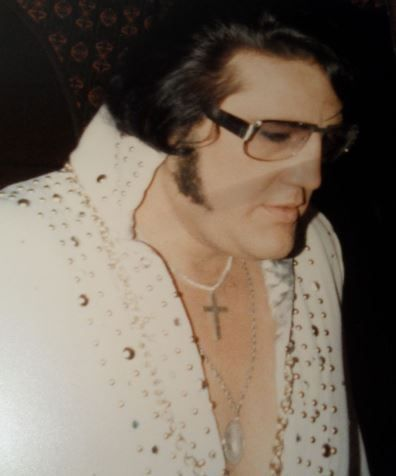
- Johnny Harra

Background information
- Birth name: Harry Lee Lovett
- Also known as: Johnny Harra
- Born: July 11, 1946; Kansas City, Missouri
- Origin: Kansas City, Missouri
- Died: March 30, 2011 (aged 64); Dallas, Texas
- Genres: Rock; Country; Gospel
- Occupation(s): Singer; Actor
- Years active: 1964 – 2011
- Labels: Autumn International Records

Johnny Lee Harra (born Harry Lee Lovett; July 11, 1946 – March 30, 2011) was an American Elvis impersonator. He began impersonating Elvis at the age of 11 and was cast as the 42-year-old Elvis in the 1981 docudrama This Is Elvis. Harra, one of four actors to portray Elvis in the movie, was featured in two scenes from the re-enactment of August 16, 1977, filmed at Graceland. After many years in seclusion he returned to the stage before the 25th anniversary of Elvis' death. In 1995, he took second place as the best impersonator of the world during the twentieth century. The title was usurped by a Colombian impersonator. Johnny Harra signed a 6 million dollar contract with the Silver Bird Hotel and Casino in Las Vegas in 1978, making him the highest paid entertainer in Las Vegas during that time.

Harra was featured in newspapers and magazines, and on national TV shows like Merv Griffin, Johnny Carson and Dick Clark. Johnny traveled internationally performing his "Profiles of Presley" show. He died on March 30, 2011, aged 64.
