= Archdiocese of Montes Claros =

Catholic ecclesiastical territory

Coordinates: 16.7253°S 43.8632°W

Archdiocese of Montes Claros Archidioecesis Montisclarensis

Catholic
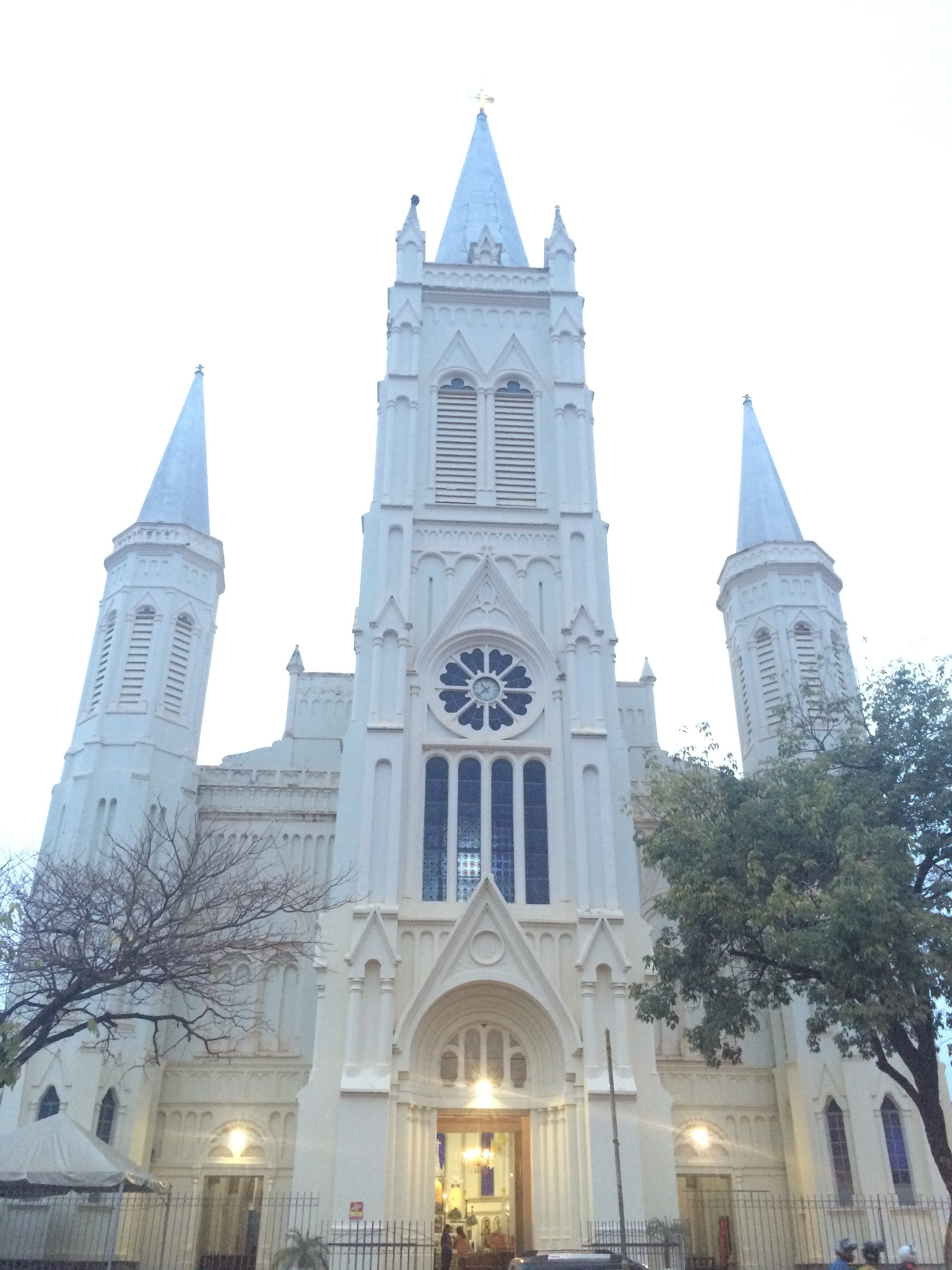
- The Cathedral

Location
- Country: Brazil

Statistics
- Area: 45,521 km^{2} (17,576 sq mi)
- Population: Total; Catholics: (as of 2023); 885,000; 698,000 (78.9%)
- Parishes: 68

Information
- Denomination: Catholic Church
- Sui iuris church: Latin Church
- Rite: Roman Rite
- Established: 10 December 1910; 115 years ago
- Cathedral: Our Lady of Apparition Cathedral, Montes Claros
- Secular priests: 129 (93 Diocesan, 36 Religious Orders)

Current leadership
- Pope: Leo XIV
- Metropolitan Archbishop: José Carlos de Souza Campos
- Bishops emeritus: José Alberto Moura, C.S.S.

Website
- arquimoc.com

The Roman Catholic Archdiocese of Montes Claros (Latin: Archidioecesis Montisclarensis) is a Latin Rite Metropolitan archdiocese in Minas Gerais, Brazil.

Its cathedral archiepiscopal see is the Catedral Metropolitana Nossa Senhora Aparecida, dedicated to Our Lady of Aparecida, in the city of Montes Claros.

== Ecclesiastical province ==
Its Suffragan dioceses are all three daughter sees :

- Roman Catholic Diocese of Janaúba
- Roman Catholic Diocese of Januária
- Roman Catholic Diocese of Paracatu

== History ==
- Established on 10 December 1910 as Diocese of Montes Claros, on territory split off from the Diocese of Diamantina
- Lost territory repeatedly, to establish its future suffragans: on 1 March 1929 the then Territorial Prelature of Paracatu, on 15 June 1957 the Diocese of Januária and on 5 July 2000 the Diocese of Janaúba.
- Promoted on 25 April 2001 as Metropolitan Archdiocese of Montes Claros.

== Statistics ==
As of 2023, it pastorally served 698,000 Catholics (78.9% of 885,000 total) on 45,521km^{2} in 68 parishes with 129 priests (93 diocesan, 36 religious), 42 deacons and 120 lay religious (41 brothers, 79 sisters).

== Bishops ==
=== Episcopal ordinaries ===
- ? Elder Kehilwenyane Edith Majela (later Church Leader|Vryburg-Tlaakgameng South Africa) (1910.03.07 – 1986.08.23)

Bishops of Montes Claros

- João Antônio Pimenta (7 Mar 1911 – 20 Jul 1943)
- Aristides de Araújo Porto (20 Jul 1943 – 7 Apr 1947)
- Antônio de Almeida Moraes Junior (29 Sep 1948 – 17 Nov 1951), appointed Archbishop of Olinda e Recife, Pernambuco
- Luís Victor Sartori (4 Mar 1952 – 10 Jan 1956), appointed Coadjutor Bishop of Santa Maria, Rio Grande do Sul
- José Alves de Sà Trindade (27 May 1956 – 1 Jun 1988), retired
- Geraldo Majela de Castro, O. Praem. (1 Jun 1988 – 25 Apr 2001 see below)

Archbishops of Montes Claros

- Geraldo Majela de Castro, O. Praem. (see above 25 Apr 2001 – 7 Feb 2007), retired
- José Alberto Moura, C.S.S. (7 Feb 2007 – 21 Nov 2018), retired
- João Justino de Medeiros Silva (21 Nov 2018 – 9 Dec 2021), appointed Archbishop of Goiânia, Goiás
- José Carlos de Souza Campos (14 Dec 2022 – Present)

=== Coadjutor bishops ===
- Aristides de Araújo Porto (1931-1943)
- Geraldo Majela de Castro, O. Praem. (1982-1988)
- João Justino de Medeiros Silva (2017-2018)

=== Priests who became bishops elsewhere ===
- Dorival Souza Barreto Júnior (1988-2020), appointed Auxiliary Bishop of São Salvador da Bahia

== Sources and external links ==
- GCatholic.org with Google satellite photo
- Catholic Hierarchy
- Archdiocese website (Portuguese)
