= Betty Lowman Carey =

- Born: Betty Lowman; July 31, 1914
- Died: March 16, 2011 (aged 96); Queen Charlotte City, Haida Gwaii, British Columbia, Canada
- Education: University of Washington
- Known for: First woman to singlehandedly row the Inside Passage
- Relatives: Bill Lowman (brother); Jack Lowman (brother); Bob Lowman (brother); Jim Lowman (brother)

Betty Lowman Carey (July 31, 1914 – March 16, 2011) became the first woman to singlehandedly row the Inside Passage of British Columbia in 1937. At the age of 22, having graduated from the University of Washington, she traveled in a traditional dugout canoe converted to include oars and named in an acronym of her brothers first names (Bill, Jack, Bob, and Jim), Bijaboji. She celebrated her 23rd birthday in Butedale on the east side of Princess Royal Island during her trip.

== The trip ==
Bijaboji is a traditional Alaska native dugout canoe, carved from red cedar. In 1931 the United States Coast Guard found the canoe floating in the vicinity of the San Juan Islands, Washington. After no owner claimed it, Lowman's father, Ray, acquired it, her brothers painted it red, strengthened it with four oak ribs, fitted it with oarlocks, and Ray gave it to Betty on her 18th birthday. Four years later she departed with a friend on June 15, 1937, from the north beach on Guemes Island, Washington, against her father's wishes, and arrived solo in Ketchikan on August 19, after 66 days.

Her friend, Florence Steele, returned home after a week when her smallpox vaccination resulted in a strong reaction. Lowman continued on alone, in a trip which featured several swampings of the canoe, frequent side trips and tows from friendly boaters, and almost daily contact, and bacon and egg breakfasts, with friendly locals. While a lost Amelia Earhart garnered international coverage during the same weeks, the "co-ed canoeist" generated significant media attention along the British Columbia coast.

== Later years ==
After the adventure, for several years Lowman toured the US giving lectures of the adventure, during which time she met and later married Neil Carey. They homesteaded on the West Coast of Moresby Island in Puffin Cove, Haida Gwaii. They eventually moved to Sandspit, Haida Gwaii, British Columbia, where the couple resides as of 2010. In 1963, Lowman, aged 49, repeated the trip in the opposite direction, rowing Bijaboji from Ketchikan to Anacortes, Washington. From 1999 to 2007, Bijaboji was displayed at the Sandspit Airport, and now is a permanent exhibit at the Anacortes History Museum, Washington. At age 90, Lowman wrote a memoir of her the trip, published in 2004 as Bijaboji: North to Alaska by Oar (ISBN 1-55017-340-5). She died at age 96 on March 16, 2011, in Queen Charlotte City, Haida Gwaii, British Columbia, Canada.
