= Illinois Institute of Technology student groups =

This article contains a list of Illinois Institute of Technology student groups. Illinois Institute of Technology (IIT) currently has over a hundred student groups on campus including musical groups, cultural clubs, and academic societies.

== Academic societies ==
Group	Brief overview	Ref
American Institute of Chemical Engineers	Chapter of AIChE hosts different speakers at its weekly meeting to offer students information on subjects of interest within the field of Chemical engineering.	
American Institute of Aeronautics and Astronautics	Chapter of AIAA engages in aerospace projects like fixing jet engines, building and designing radio-controlled aircraft, and assisting the Adler Planetarium with the Far Horizons project. The chapter owns a flight simulator lab which hosts a high performance computer loaded with Microsoft Flight Simulator X, X-Plane, and RealFlight. The lab features a flight stick, 6-axis rudder pedals, thrust box, and an RC flight controller. The society is to match up with interests within the field of Aerospace engineering.	
American Society of Mechanical Engineers	Chapter of ASME takes part in different design contests at the ASME regional conferences and national convention. Examples design competitions include creating a non-Newtonian fluid, constructing self-propelled cargo boats, and constructing different types of gliders.	
American Institute of Architecture Students	chapter of AIAS	
Association for Computing Machinery	Chapter of the ACM holds weekly meeting on campus.	
Institute of Electrical and Electronics Engineers	Chapter of IEEE hosts computer and electronic workshops for students including programming tutorials, PCB layout design, and tours of the Motorola facilities.	
Material Advantage	Student professional society for material engineers; affiliated with TMS, American Ceramic Society (ACerS), AIST, and ASM International.	
National Society of Black Engineers		
Tau Beta Pi	The National Engineering Honor Society, Illinois-Beta Chapter	
Society of Physics Students	Physics student organization	

== STEM organizations ==
Group	Brief overview	Ref
Illinois Tech Robotics	Engages in mentoring other robotics clubs at high schools in the Chicago area, supporting regional robotics competitions for high school students, and building robots for several competitions at the college-level and beyond.	
IIT Society of Automotive Engineers	Builds Formula Hybrid race cars and other automotive projects.	
Illinois Tech Railroad Club	Student chapter of the American Railway Engineering and Maintenance-of-Way Association and a Free-mo model railroad club	
Scarlet Spacehawks	Organization to design robotic prototypes for space exploration.	

== Service organizations ==
Group	Brief overview	Ref
Alternate Spring Break	Volunteer on Habitat for Humanity build sites.	
Circle K International	Collegiate service organization.	

== Religious organizations ==
Group	Brief overview	Ref
CRU	Interdenominational Christian organization.	
Hillel	Jewish organization that hosts social, religious, and holiday events.	
Korean Christian Association	Organization for Korean Christian students.	
Muslim Student Association	Organization to support Muslim students through their academic journeys.	
Pagan Forum	Organization to explore and engage with ancient polytheistic religions.	
Vedic Vision Society	Organizes spiritual discussions.	

== Arts and media groups ==
Group	Brief overview	Ref
Love to Dance	Multi-style dance group	
33rd Street Productions	Drama club; produces a musical in the fall and a play in the spring	
Alien Sound and Lighting	Provides professional quality sound and lighting for student events on campus	
A Cappella	Student-run a cappella choral organization	
American String Teachers Association	Organization for string orchestra teachers and players	
Exposure	Student led photography club	
Film Club	Cinematic arts club	
National Association for Music Education	Supports music educators	
National Band Association	Organization for band teachers and players	
Percussion Club	Celebrates percussion instruments	
TechNews	Student led newspaper	
WIIT	Student run radio station featuring music and talk programs broadcasting on 88.9 FM	
Writers at Illinois Tech	Student writing group	

== Other clubs ==
Group	Brief overview	Ref
Union Board	Programs campus activities since 1938.	-
International Student Organization	Promotes diversity and hosts events to encourage understanding between the many cultural backgrounds of students at IIT.	
JFAS	Japanese Film & Animation Society. Dedicated to promoting the modern Japanese visual story-telling art forms	
Illinois Tech Esports	Formed in 2013 to participate in collegiate esports. Playing against other North American colleges in popular titles including League of Legends, Overwatch, and Hearthstone. Regular social gatherings including viewing parties, all-nighter LANs, and costume parties. Since 2018, manages and operates the campus' esports arena in MTCC.	-
Prism	Support group for LGBTQIA+ students. Holds social and educational events.	
IIT Commuter Student Association	Provides workshops and events for commuter students.	

== Greek organizations ==
Society	Brief overview	Ref
Alpha Epsilon Pi	Moved to IIT from University of Chicago in 1948. Closed and returned to U of C in 2000	
Alpha Sigma Phi		
Delta Tau Delta		
Sigma Phi Epsilon	Closed in 2013, reopened in 2019	
Pi Kappa Phi		
Phi Kappa Sigma		
Phi Mu Alpha	National Fraternity Society in Music	
Tau Epsilon Phi	Closed in 1993	
Triangle Fraternity		
Alpha Sigma Alpha	The only national sorority on campus	
Kappa Phi Delta	Oldest sorority on campus	
