= Diocese of Paracatu =

Catholic ecclesiastical territory

Diocese of Paracatu Dioecesis Paracatuensis

Catholic
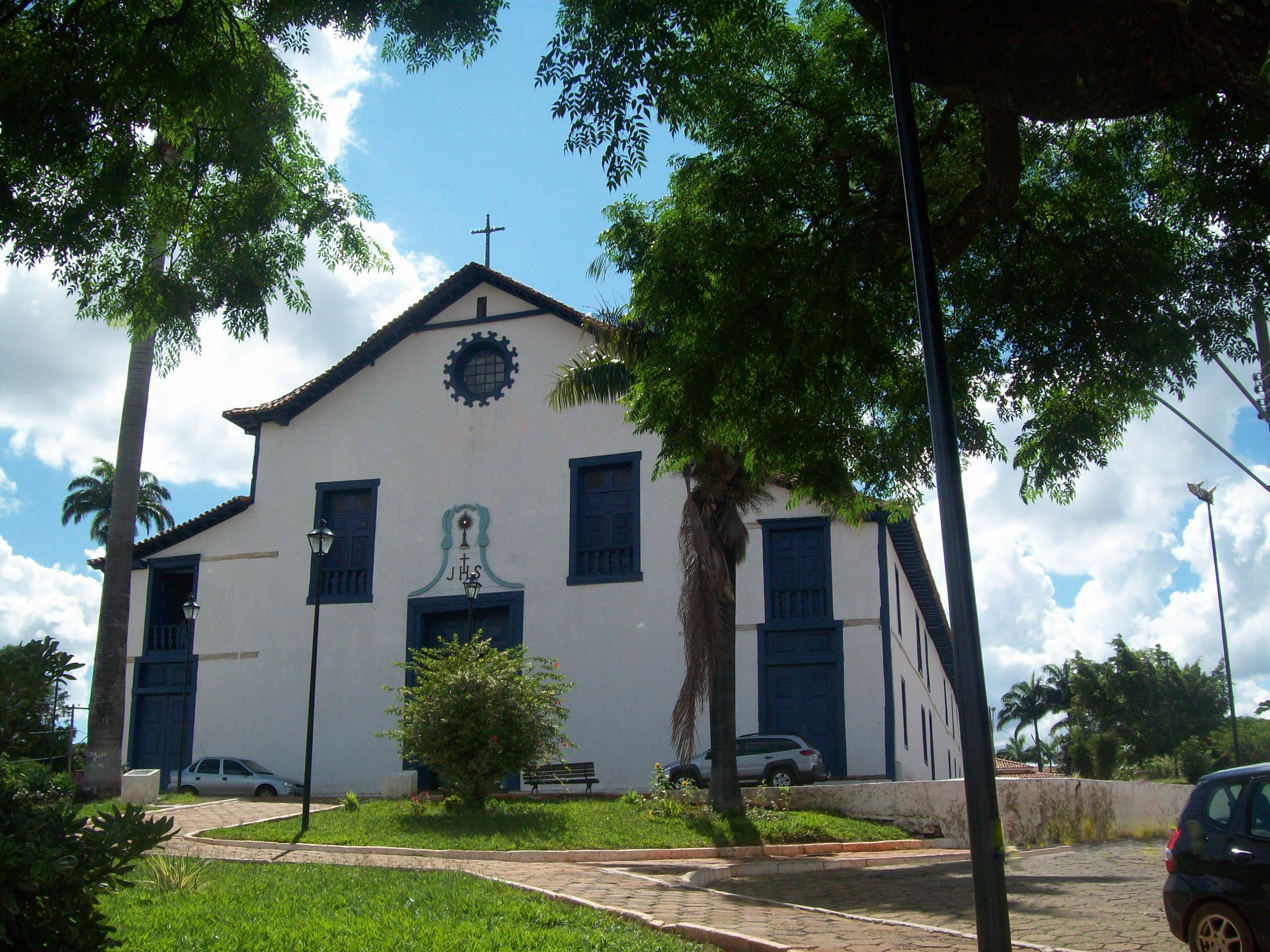

Location
- Country: Brazil
- Ecclesiastical province: Montes Claros

Statistics
- Area: 54,387 km^{2} (20,999 sq mi)
- Population: Total; Catholics: (as of 2004); 300,000; 234,000 (78.0%)

Information
- Rite: Latin Rite
- Established: 1 March 1929 (97 years ago)
- Cathedral: Catedral Santo Antônio

Current leadership
- Pope: Leo XIV
- Bishop: Jorge Alves Bezerra, S.S.S.
- Metropolitan Archbishop: João Justino de Medeiros Silva
- Bishops emeritus: Leonardo de Miranda Pereira

The Roman Catholic Diocese of Paracatu (Latin: Dioecesis Paracatuensis) is a diocese located in the city of Paracatu in the ecclesiastical province of Montes Claros in Brazil.

== History ==
- 1 March 1929: Established as Territorial Prelature of Paracatu from the Diocese of Montes Claros and Diocese of Uberaba
- 14 April 1962: Promoted as Diocese of Paracatu

== Bishops ==
=== Ordinaries ===
- Prelates of Paracatu (Roman Rite)
  - Eliseu Van de Weijer, O. Carm. † (25 May 1940 - 14 April 1962) Resigned
- Bishops of Paracatu (Roman rite)
  - Raimundo Luí, O. Carm. † (11 June 1962 - 20 July 1977) Resigned
  - José Cardoso Sobrinho, O. Carm. (29 March 1979 - 2 April 1985) Appointed, Archbishop of Olinda e Recife, Pernambuco
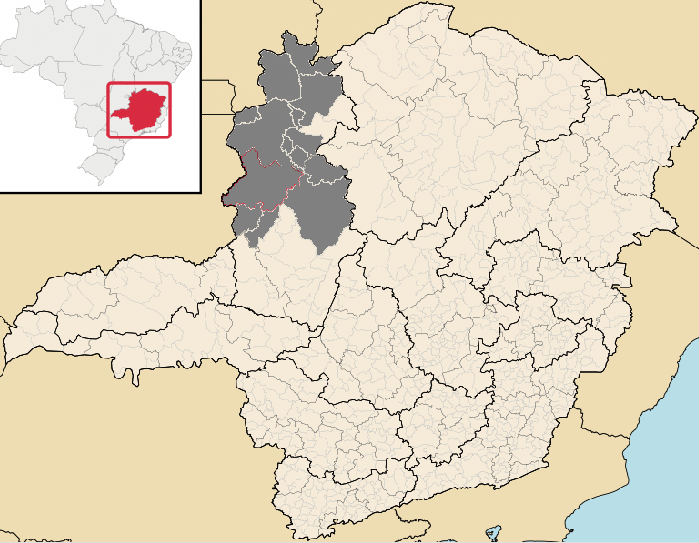
  - Map of the diocese.
    Leonardo de Miranda Pereira (6 May 1986 - 7 November 2012) Resigned
  - Jorge Alves Bezerra, S.S.S. (7 November 2012 – present)

=== Other priest of this diocese who became bishop ===
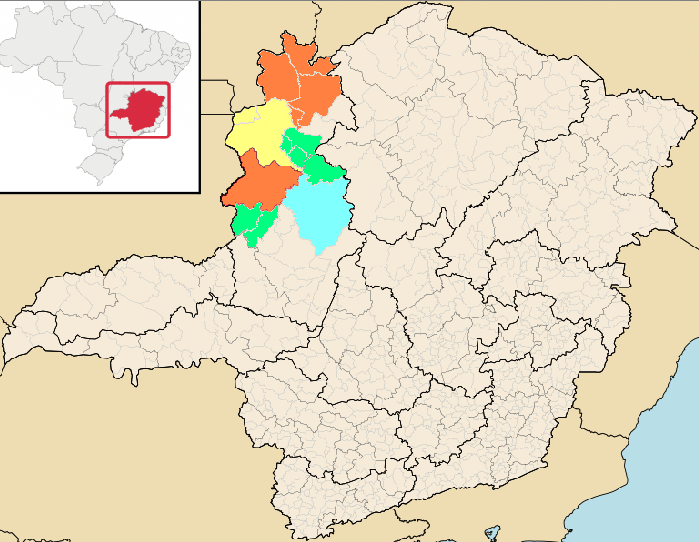
- Divisions of the diocese.
  Benedito Gonçalves dos Santos, appointed Bishop of Presidente Prudente, São Paulo in 2008
