= Bojangles (restaurant) =

American regional fast food chain

Bojangles OpCo, LLC

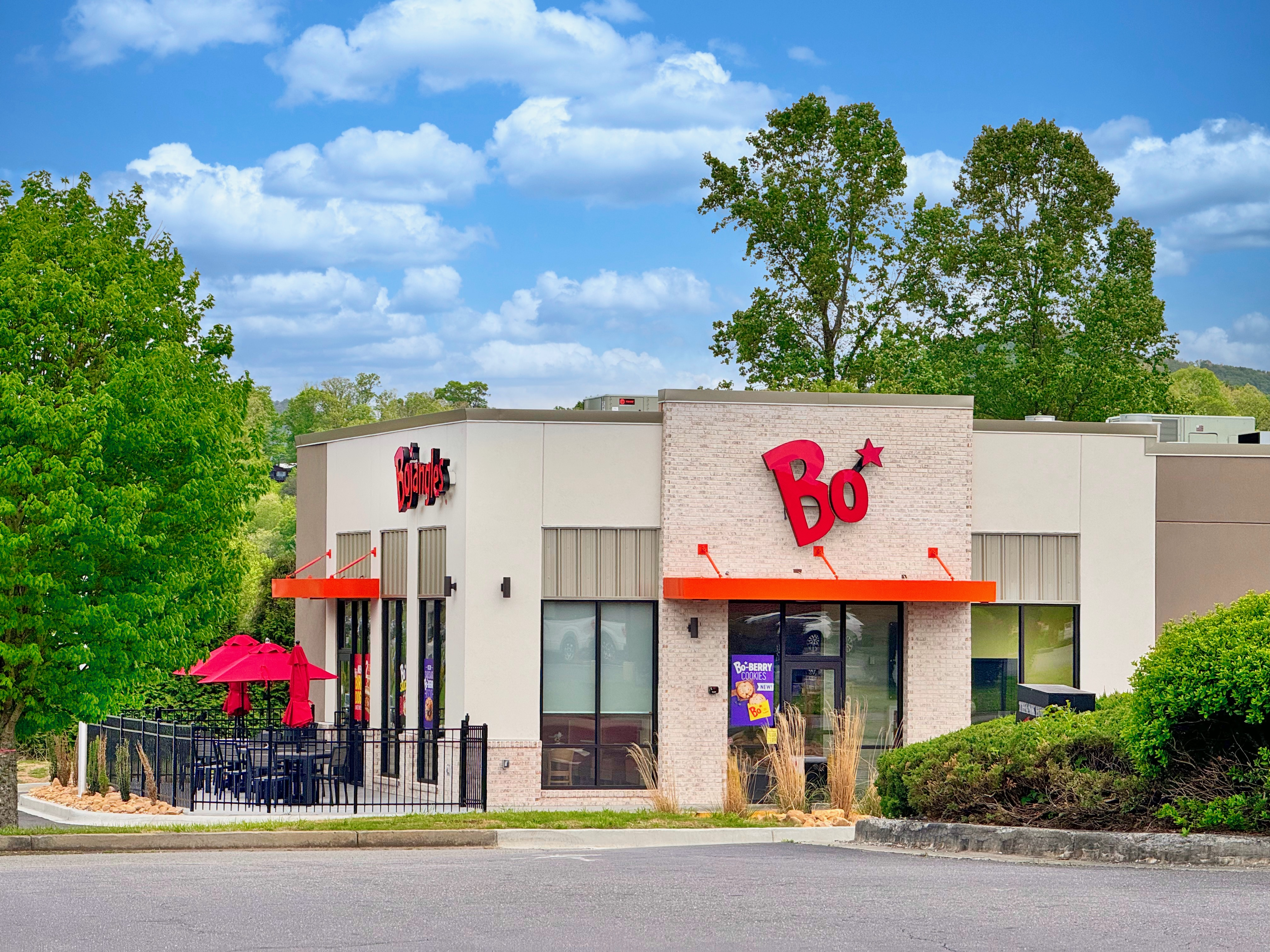
- A Bojangles location in Hiawassee, Georgia, United States
- Trade name: Bojangles
- Type: Private
- Industry: Food Franchising
- Founded: July 6, 1977; 49 years ago Charlotte, North Carolina, U.S.
- Founders: Jack Fulk; Richard Thomas
- Headquarters: Charlotte, North Carolina, United States
- Number of locations: 884 (2026)
- Area served: United States; Honduras
- Key people: Jose Armario (CEO); Brian Unger (COO); Jackie Woodward (CMO)
- Products: Fast food, including fried chicken, biscuits, french fries
- Revenue: ▲US$547 million (2021)
- Owner: TJC L.P. Durational Capital Management
- Number of employees: 9,900 (2021)
- Website: www.bojangles.com

Bojangles OpCo, LLC., doing business as Bojangles (known as Bojangles' Famous Chicken 'n Biscuits until 2020), is an American regional chain of fast food restaurants that specializes in Cajun-seasoned fried chicken and buttermilk biscuits and primarily serves the Southeastern United States. The company was founded in Charlotte, North Carolina in 1977 by Jack Fulk and Richard Thomas.

Bojangles has a location in Honduras and previously franchised restaurants in Grand Cayman Island, Jamaica, Mexico and China. As of 2025, restaurants are in 22 U.S. states (Alabama, Arkansas, Colorado, Florida, Georgia, Illinois, Kentucky, Louisiana, Maryland, Michigan, Mississippi, Nevada, New Jersey, North Carolina, Ohio, Pennsylvania, South Carolina, Tennessee, Texas, Virginia and West Virginia) with planned expansions into Arizona, California, Kansas, Missouri, New York and Oklahoma. Its home state of North Carolina has the largest number of locations.

== History ==
Logo used from 1977 until 2020

Bojangles was founded on July 6, 1977 in Charlotte. In the following year, the first franchised restaurant began operations.

Jack Fulk sold the Bojangles concept to the now-defunct Horn & Hardart Company of New York in 1981.

During Horn and Hardart's ownership, the chain grew rapidly and expanded to 335 restaurants including 100 in Florida. Part of this growth was fueled by acquisitions including Judy Judy Judy's in 1982 and the Florida-based Biskits chain in 1984.

Bojangles received fame in 1989 because its restaurants remained open when Hurricane Hugo struck the Carolinas when most other fast-food restaurants had closed.

In 1990, Horn and Hardart sold most of its interest to Sienna Partners and Interwest Partners. The company was then headed by the former KFC executive, Dick Campbell. In 1994, the company attempted a public offering. Campbell was subsequently replaced by CEO Jim Peterson. The company was sold to a group of investors headed by the former Wendy's executive Joe Drury and financed by FMAC in 1998.

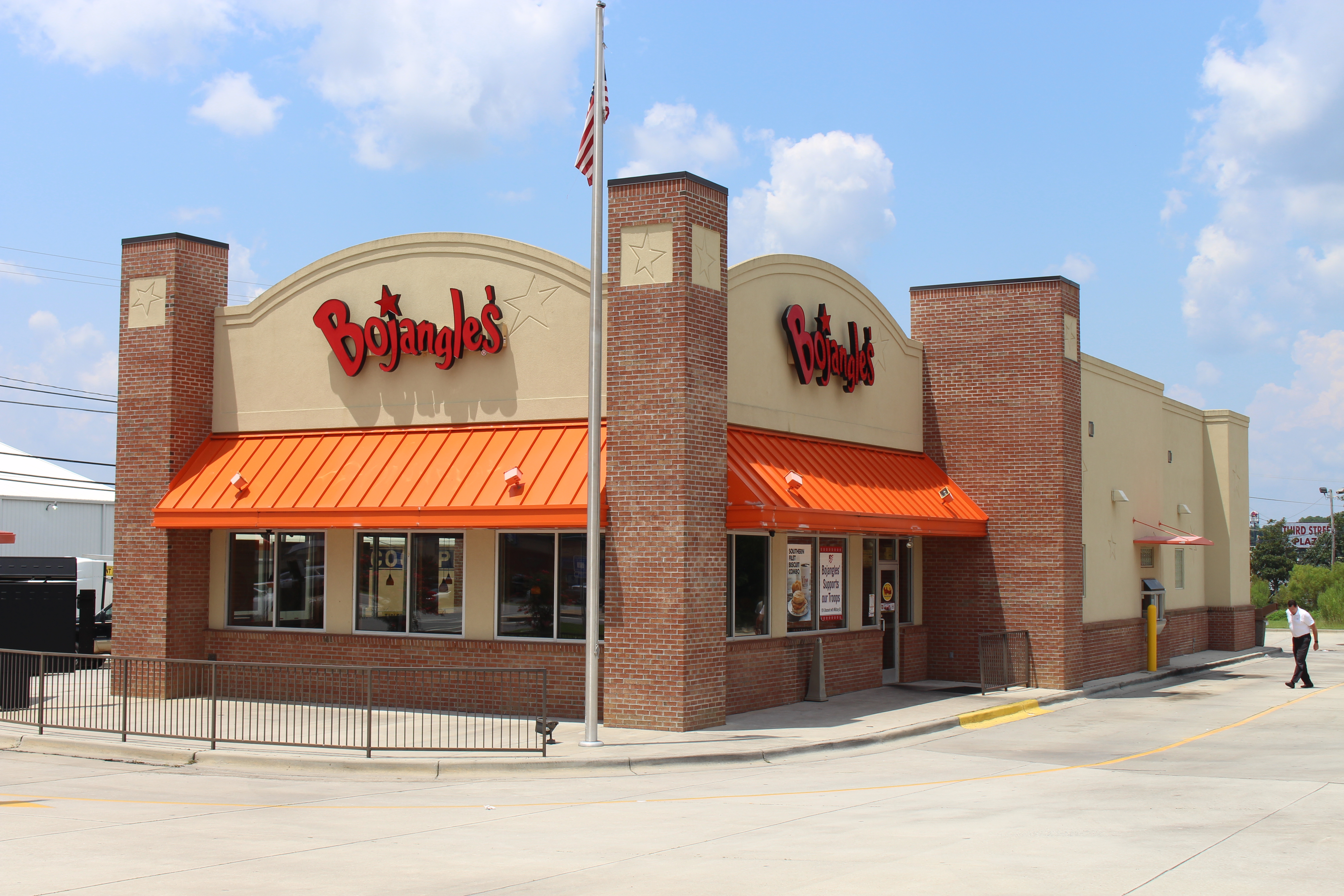
Bojangles in Tifton, Georgia

Bojangles expanded throughout the 1990s and 2000s, with the 300th location opened in 2003. The restaurant started its first college campus location on the grounds of Central Piedmont Community College in 2005. The company also purchased naming rights to the original Charlotte Coliseum on Independence Boulevard in Charlotte.

Bojangles was purchased again in 2007 by Falfurrias Capital Partners, a private equity firm. The first airport location was opened in 2008 at the Charlotte Douglas International Airport. In August 2011, Falfurrias sold Bojangles to Boston-based Advent International, another private equity firm, after a competitive bidding process with other investors.

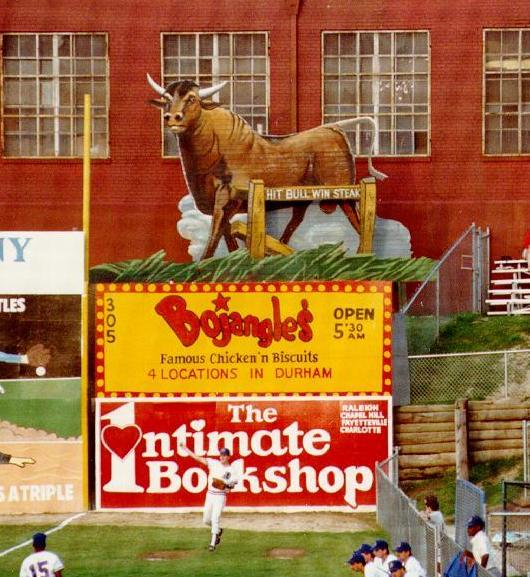
Advertisement for Bojangles' at Durham Athletic Park in Durham, North Carolina (1989)

In 2012, Bojangles began sponsoring the NASCAR race Bojangles' Southern 500, and opened another college campus restaurant at UNC Greensboro.

The company's 600th restaurant opened on July 8, 2014, on Galleria Road in Charlotte with Charlotte mayor Dan Clodfelter cutting the celebratory ribbon.

In April 2015, the company filed with the US regulator for an initial public offering of its common stock, expecting to raise $372 million.

In January 2019, Randy Kibler was replaced by Jose Armario as the chief executive officer and brought with him Brian Unger as the chief operating officer. Both were past employees of McDonald's.

On January 28, 2019, Bojangles was acquired by The Jordan Company and Durational Capital Management (making it a privately held company) with Bojangles shareholders receiving $16.10 a share after their approval on January 14, 2019.

In December 2019, Bojangles and Love's Travel Stops & Country Stores came to an agreement to add 40 Bojangles locations at Love's Travel Stops in Illinois, Oklahoma, Arkansas and Mississippi – all new states for Bojangles (except Mississippi) – over the following ten years.

On August 3, 2020, the company released a statement saying that it was dropping the apostrophe from its name. On the same day, Bojangles released a video announcing a partnership with Dale Earnhardt Jr., the first celebrity to say the words, "It's Bo Time."

On March 5, 2021, Bojangles announced a planned expansion into Columbus, Ohio, its first Ohio location, to begin later that year. The announcement came on the same day Taco Johns announced it would significantly boost its Central Ohio presence, as well as already-planned expansions into the market by Sheetz and Del Taco.

In March 2022, Bojangles announced that it would open its first 10 locations in New Jersey. In July 2023, Bojangles announced they would further expand to the West Coast, opening 20 in Las Vegas. In March 2024, it was announced they would expand to Phoenix. In April 2024, it was announced they would expand into those So Cal counties: L.A., Orange, Riverside & San Bernardino besides San Diego, CA.

On July 9, 2025, Bojangles opened its first Colorado location in Pueblo, Colorado.

On February 3, 2026, Bojangles opened its first Michigan Location in Wyoming, Michigan.

== Menu ==
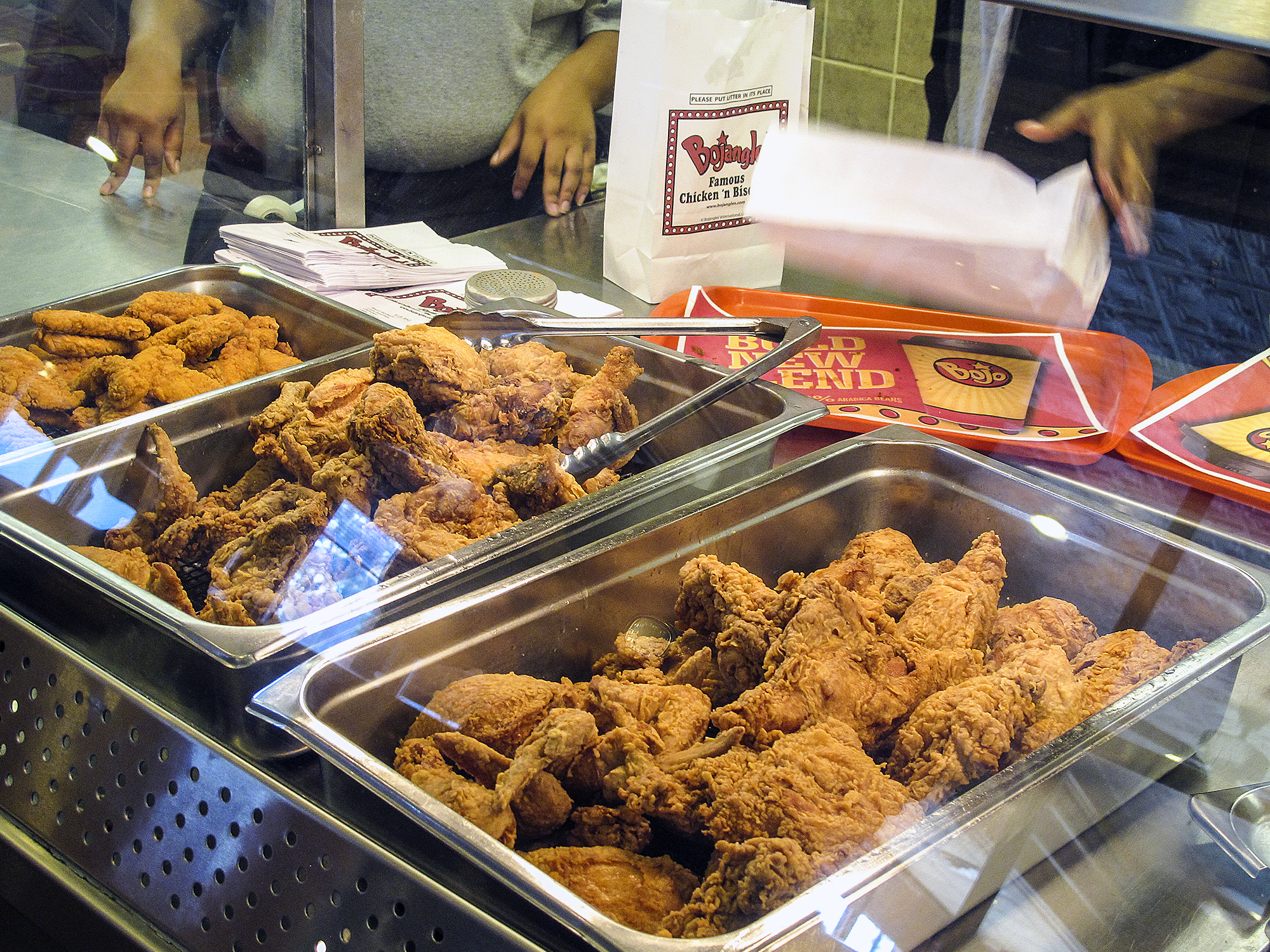
Fried chicken at Bojangles

Restaurants offer the full menu during all operating hours. Biscuit sandwiches are the predominant breakfast item, including the signature cajun chicken filet biscuit, as well as country ham, egg, cheese, bacon, sausage and country fried steak options. For lunch and dinner, the signature item is the bone-in fried chicken with a variety of side items (called "Fixin's"), including French fries, cajun-seasoned pinto beans, dirty rice, Bo-tato Rounds (a type of hashbrowns), coleslaw, green beans, macaroni and cheese, mashed potatoes and grits. They also offer boneless chicken tenders known as "Chicken Supremes" which are served with a variety of dipping sauces, fried and grilled chicken sandwiches, a fish sandwich known as the "Bojangler" and a number of salads which can be topped with either grilled or fried chicken. Desserts include the Bo-Berry biscuit, which is a biscuit with blueberries topped with a sugar glaze, a sweet-potato fried pie and cinnamon biscuits. Seasonal and limited-time offerings also appear on some menus, such as pork chop biscuits. In April 2024, Bojangles added and created Bo's Bird Dog that features a chicken supreme in a toasted hot dog bun. In August 2024, they added bone-in chicken wings to their menu in plain, Creamy Buffalo, and Barbecue flavors.

== Animal welfare ==
In 2016, Bojangles pledged to transition to 100 percent cage-free eggs by 2025 as part of its Corporate Social Responsibility (CSR) program. However, as of 2025, they have not provided any updates on this goal.

== Sponsorships ==
- Atlantic Coast Conference
- Carolina Panthers
- WWE

== See also ==
- List of fast-food chicken restaurants
- Bojangles Coliseum
