= Anselmo Müller =

Anselmo Müller MSF
- Bishop of Januária
- Church: Catholic Church
- Diocese: Diocese of Januária
- In office: 25 April 1984 – 12 November 2008
- Predecessor: Johannes Baptist Przyklenk
- Successor: José Moreira da Silva

Orders
- Ordination: 10 December 1961
- Consecration: 24 June 1984 by Alberto Frederico Etges

Personal details
- Born: 22 February 1932 Santa Cruz do Sul, São Pedro do Rio Grande do Sul, Republic of the United States of Brazil
- Died: 24 March 2011 (aged 79)

Anselmo Müller (February 22, 1932 – March 24, 2011) was the Roman Catholic bishop of the Roman Catholic Diocese of Januária, Brazil.

Born in Brazil, Müller was ordained a priest in 1961. In 1984, Müller was appointed bishop of the Januária Diocese and retired in 2008.
