= Robert Knights (water polo) =

British water polo player

Personal information
- Nationality: British
- Born: 22 July 1931; Islington, England
- Died: 24 March 2011 (aged 79); Mayland, England

Sport
- Sport: Water polo

Robert Knights (22 July 1931 – 24 March 2011) was a British water polo player. He competed in the men's tournament at the 1956 Summer Olympics.
