= Héctor Francisco Medina Polanco =

Honduran journalist (1974–2011)

- Born: Héctor Francisco Medina Polanco; 5 March 1974; Honduras
- Died: 11 March 2011 (aged 37); Morazán, Yoro, Honduras
- Occupation: Television Journalist
- Employer: Omega Visión

Héctor Francisco Medina Polanco was a Honduran journalist who often reported on agricultural and corruption issues in Honduras. An employee of Omega Visión, he died 11 May 2011 from gunshot wounds inflicted by assailants the previous evening.

== Personal ==
Héctor Francisco Medina Polanco is survived by his brother and his mother.

== Career ==
In his TV program, he often criticized irregularities in the Morazán municipal government and referred to land disputes involving the region’s cattle farmers. Medina received threats as a result of the views he had expressed on agricultural issues. According to his brother, Carlos Medina Polanco, Héctor had received death threats on several occasions over the past six months as a result of his work in publicizing human rights issues. He spoke out on agricultural issues and was a strong critic of police actions. He also criticized private security groups who guard the property of wealthy estates owners in the areas where drug gangs notoriously operate. He often spoke out against irregularities in Morazán's municipal government and raised social, political and education issues on his news program. He also worked on a governmental education project called Programa Hondureño de Educación Comunitaria (Honduran Program for Community Education).

== Death ==
Medina was shot on his motorcycle by two other men on another motorcycle. He was struck twice in the chest and once in the arm. His killers followed him to his home in Morazán, a town outside the city of El Progreso. He died the next day from related complications at a municipal hospital in San Pedro Sula. Front Line believes that the killing of Héctor Francisco Medina Polanco is directly related to his work in the defense of human rights, particularly his reporting of agricultural and corruption issues in Honduras.

== Context ==
Héctor's brother, journalist Carlos Alberto Medina Polanco, has reported to C-Libre that he has been receiving death threats via messages on his mobile phone. In the messages he has been told that he will "meet the same fate" if he continues to demand an investigation into his brother's death. He also noted that he has been followed by individuals on a motorcycle when he leaves the San Pedro Sula radio station where he works. As a result, he has taken a temporary leave of absence from his position at the station. In addition, he reported that, on 10 June 2011, his 16-year-old daughter was kidnapped, assaulted and questioned about his activities for three hours. "The trauma caused by the coup continues to affect Honduran society and the current demonstrations are an expression of this," AMARC-ALC and Reporters Without Borders said. "The repression has been stepped up again in the wake of the testimony about the situation that representatives of grass-roots movements, civil society organizations and NGOs gave to the Inter-American Commission on Human Rights, now in session."

== Impact ==
Medina was the 11th journalist killed in Honduras; none have been investigated. "It will be hard to celebrate National Day of the Journalist on 25 May if the persecution of community radio stations and news media opposed to the June 2009 coup d’état continues at the same frenetic pace, especially in the San Pedro Sula region, where there have been several cases in recent days," Reporters Without Borders said.

The World Association of Community Radio Broadcasters for Latin America and Caribbean (AMARC-ALC) and Reporters Without Borders have appealed for an end to the hostility toward community and opposition media (or what is regarded as opposition media) amid the continuing social unrest in Honduras:

It is clear from what has been happening that the government has not kept the promises it made to the United Nations Human Rights Council. As regards the areas covered by our mandates, we believe that there will be no peace in Honduras as long as:

- The impunity continues, not only for the murders of journalists and human rights activists, but also for the attacks and acts of sabotage against the media, whose perpetrators are known.
- The authorities continue to enforce obsolete radio-broadcast and telecommunications laws that allow no place for community media, although legislation for this media is required by Inter-American legal standards.
- The authorities continue to block access to public information about responsibility for the most serious abuses following the coup d'état. Until then, the attitudes of the coup will continue to prevail.

On 28 March 2012, activist Miriam Miranda was beaten by police and soldiers, arrested and held for 12 hours. Miranda is the president of the Fraternal Black Organization of Honduras (Ofraneh). This organization created Radio Faluma Bimetu (Coco Dulce), a community radio station that has been censored and attacked. Although she has been released, Miranda remains charged with sedition.

Radio Progreso journalist Pedro López was subsequently arrested. López and two other people were detained during a protest against privatization of the education sector, fuel price increases and poor working conditions in garment assembly plants (known as maquilas).

== Reactions ==
According to other sources consulted by C-Libre, the DNIC knows the names of the men who allegedly murdered Héctor Medina Polanco. The organization is also said to know the amount of money they were allegedly paid for carrying out the assassination. Carlos Medina Polanco noted that both President Porfirio Lobo Sosa and Security Minister Oscar Álvarez have promised to bring the assassins to justice, but to date they are still awaiting information about any results in the investigation. Mr. Porfirio Lobo Sosa and his allies are trying to reinstate Honduras as an OAS member during the General Assembly next June, shading human rights violations that he frequently calls "export political actions by groups that live off that."
