= Diocese of Januária =

Catholic ecclesiastical territory

Coordinates: 15.4843°S 44.3594°W

Diocese of Januária Dioecesis Ianuariensis

Catholic

Location
- Country: Brazil
- Ecclesiastical province: Montes Claros

Statistics
- Area: 37,961 km^{2} (14,657 sq mi)
- Population: Total; Catholics: (as of 2004); 287,150; 260,000 (90.5%)

Information
- Rite: Latin Rite
- Established: 15 June 1957 (69 years ago)
- Cathedral: Catedral Nossa Senhora das Dores

Current leadership
- Pope: Leo XIV
- Bishop: Dorival Souza Barreto Júnior
- Metropolitan Archbishop: José Carlos de Souza Campos

The Roman Catholic Diocese of Januária (Latin: Dioecesis Ianuariensis) is a diocese located in the city of Januária in the ecclesiastical province of Montes Claros in Brazil.

== History ==
- 15 June 1957: Established as Diocese of Januária from the Diocese of Montes Claros and Territorial Prelature of Paracatu

== Leadership ==
- Bishops of Januária (Roman rite)
  - Daniel Tavares Baeta Neves † (16 May 1958 – 1 June 1962) Resigned
  - João Batista Przyklenk, M.S.F. † (1 June 1962 – 1 March 1976) appointed, Vicar Apostolic of Tromsø
  - Anselmo Müller, M.S.F. † (25 April 1984 – 12 November 2008) Retired
  - José Moreira da Silva (12 Nov 2008 – 14 Dec 2022)
  - Dorival Souza Barreto Júnior (18 June 2025 – present)
