= Robert Underwood (baseball) =

American baseball player

- Shortstop
- Born: December 24, 1934; Birmingham, Alabama
- Died: March 26, 2011 (aged 76)
- Batted: ? Threw: ?

Negro American League debut
- 1955, for the Birmingham Black Barons

Last appearance
- 1957, for the Birmingham Black Barons

Teams
- Birmingham Black Barons (1955–1957)

Robert Lee Underwood (December 24, 1934 - March 26, 2011) played baseball for the Birmingham Black Barons of the Negro American League in 1955, staying with the team until 1957.
