= South Berkeley, Berkeley, California =

Neighborhood in Berkeley, California, USA

South Berkeley is a neighborhood in the city of Berkeley, California. It extends roughly from Dwight Way to the city’s border with Oakland, between Telegraph Avenue in the east and either Sacramento Street or San Pablo Avenue in the west. It lies at an elevation of 102 feet (31 m).

== Demographics ==
This neighborhood is the center for Berkeley's African-American community, with a population of 9,341 that is roughly 52% African American. Traditionally, it was considered to be the most economically depressed portion of Berkeley; however, as rent has risen in the city over the past several years, South Berkeley has become more attractive to students and other young people, and rents in the area have become comparable to other, more affluent Berkeley neighborhoods. South Berkeley is crisscrossed by AC Transit bus lines.

== History ==
South Berkeley is part of the old Rancho San Antonio, approximately 45,000 acres of land granted by Don Pablo Vicente de Sola, Governor of Alta California, in 1820, to Luis Maria Peralta in recognition of his forty years of military service and his work in establishing the missions of Santa Clara, Santa Cruz, and San Jose. In 1842, Peralta divided his land between his four sons. José Domingo Peralta received the title to the northernmost portion, including present-day Berkeley and Albany.

By 1872, the Berkeley L.T.I. Association had mapped out the gridded streets of what is now South Berkeley; however, there were no houses yet.

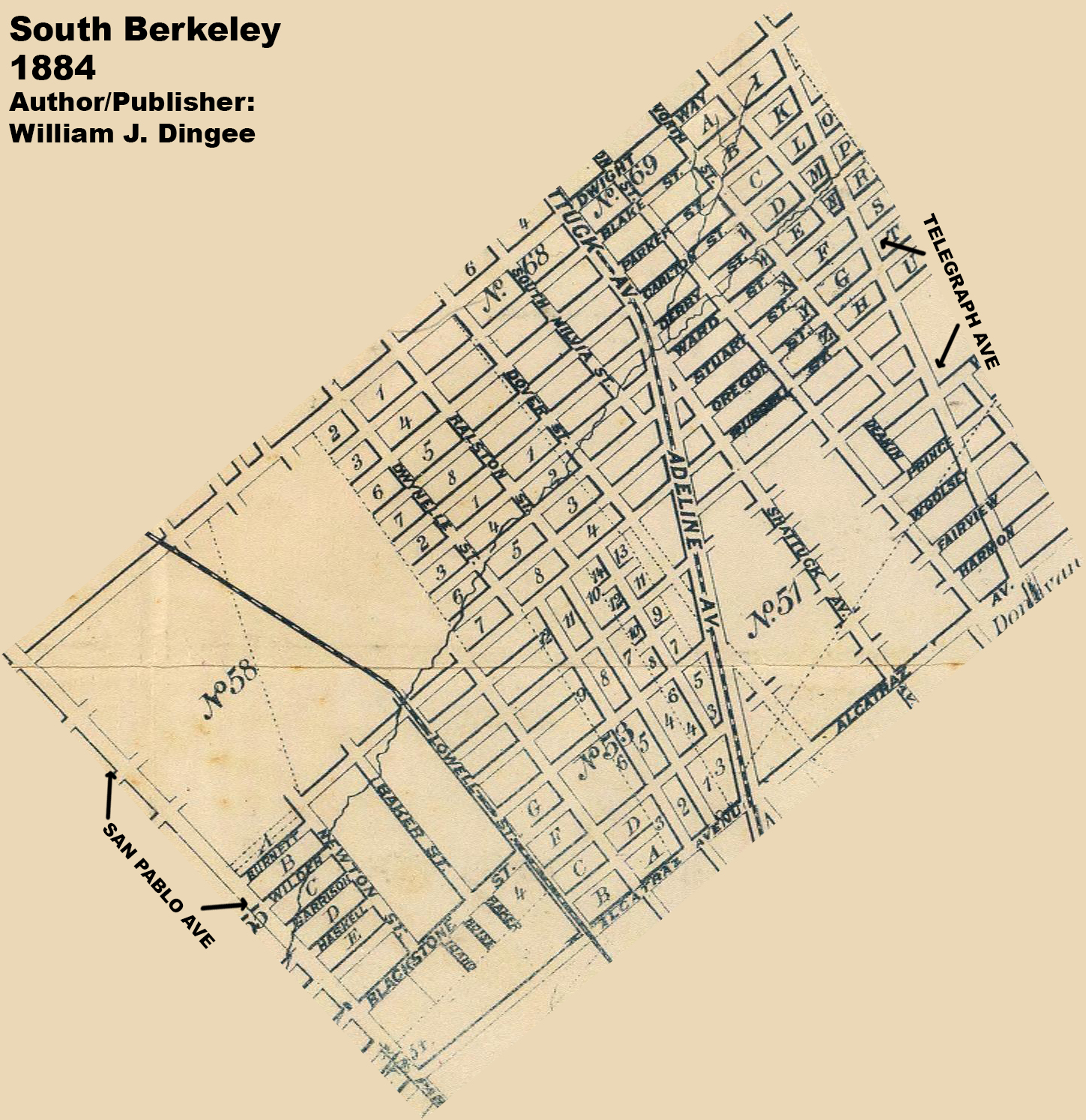

In 1873, a house was built for Mark Ashby, and 10 years later, to the south, a house for his brother William Ashby. The house, in 1938, was advertised as a Friendly farm, where "FRIENDLY FARM - Applications now being accepted for spring semester, to start March 1st. Groups limited to 12 pre-school children Curriculum Includes painting, nature study, music, habit training. Nominal rates. 2915 Deakin. Berkeley." ( The name of the street having been changed from North street )

During World War II, Camp Ashby, a camp for African American soldiers, was established in the area.

South Berkeley has been the East Bay mecca for sports, from competitive softball leagues, little league baseball, to the Midnight & Twilight Basketball League at Grove Park.

== Places ==
Services and businesses located in South Berkeley include the Ashby BART station, the Shotgun Players theatre, La Peña Cultural Center, and the Berkeley Tool Lending Library. The Berkeley Bowl supermarket, which has one of the most extensive selections of produce and specialty foods in the Bay Area, operates one of its two stores there. The Ashby BART station hosts a flea market each weekend in its parking lot. The area is also home to Wat Mongkolratanaram, a Thai Buddhist temple that serves a Sunday brunch.

A 100-foot-long mural of South Berkeley history on Ashby Avenue at Ellis Street was painted in 2018 under the direction of muralist Edythe Boone.

== Historical Plaques ==
The Berkeley Historical Plaque Project has, so far, commemorated six locations in South Berkeley:

At 2960 Sacramento Street, a plaque and nearby sculpture commemorate Dr. William Byron Rumford's Pharmacy.

At 2643 Dana Street, a plaque memorializes the home and life of Anthony Boucher, editor and writer.

At 1500 Derby Street, a City of Berkeley Landmark plaque commemorates Longfellow School, an architecturally and culturally important public institution which currently houses the Longfellow Magnet Middle School.

At 2237 Carleton Street, a City of Berkeley Landmark plaque commemorates the Woodworth House, home and workspace for entomologist, naturalist, physicist, and inventor Charles W. Woodworth. Woodworth was a professor of entomology, and assisted in developing the University’s College of Agriculture and the City of Berkeley’s first public library.

At 3332 Adeline Street, a City of Berkeley Landmark plaque commemorates the Lorin Theater, South Berkeley's first neighborhood theater, that, at one point, could seat up to 1,500 people.

At 3290 Adeline Street, a City of Berkeley Landmark plaque commemorates the South Berkeley Bank. In the early 20th century, this was one of two banks anchoring the busy Lorin business district’s streetcar intersection. Designed by John Galen Howard, the bank building shares an architect with multiple other buildings in Berkeley.

== Parks and recreation ==
South Berkeley includes San Pablo Park (13 acres), Grove Park (3 acres), and several mini-parks. Grove Park is home to a nationally ranked men's basketball team, the Berkeley All-Stars, coached by Bay Area basketball legend Eugene Evans. Grove Park and San Pablo Park have been the training grounds for many well-known athletes, including Don Barksdale, Claudell Washington, Phil Chenier, Shooty Babitt, Je'Rod Cherry and Jason Kidd. The tennis court area at Grove Park is now called William C. Charles Courts, named after the late "Mr. Charles" (also known as "the waving man"). He would stand in front of his house on the corner of Grove and Oregon Streets every morning from about 7 am to 10 am waving to passersby while saying "Keep smiling" and "Have a beautiful day". He did this every day for 30 years. South Berkeley residents respected and appreciated Mr. Charles, who died in 2002, and the Grove Street Park tennis courts were named in his honor.

== Notable residents ==
William Bryon Rumford - (February 2, 1908 – June 12, 1986) - First Black person elected to a state public office in Northern California - William was the first African American elected to a state public office in Northern California. He became the first African American hired at Highland Hospital in Oakland, California, where he was assistant pharmacist. In 1942, while still working for the state, he purchased a pharmacy in Berkeley which he named Rumford's Pharmacy. In 1942, Berkeley mayor Laurance L. Cross appointed Rumford to the Emergency Housing Committee, which sought to find housing for wartime laborers. In his capacity as committee member, he was able to push for more integrated housing. In his first year in the state assembly, Rumford succeeded in passing legislation barring discrimination in the state National Guard. One of Rumford's most important achievements was the passage of the 1959 Fair Employment Practices Act, which outlawed employment discrimination. In 1963, Rumford introduced Assembly Bill 1240, the Fair Housing Bill. It became known as the Rumford Fair Housing Bill, and its purpose was to outlaw discrimination in housing. The bill was at the top of Governor Brown's legislative agenda, and it had been endorsed by the NAACP and the California Democratic Party. Nonetheless, it faced strong opposition and was amended several times before being passed by a vote of 47 to 24. When it reached the state senate, members of the Congress of Racial Equality occupied the rotunda of the California State Capitol. Rumford asked them to leave, but they refused. The bill was held up for three months, and the committee didn't hold a hearing on it until the last day of the session. Despite the opposition of the California Real Estate Association, the Apartment House Owners Association, and the Chamber of Commerce, the bill passed the senate and was signed into law by Governor Brown. Rumford was honored at the 1972 World Symposium on Air Pollution Control, which recognized his contributions to the fight against air pollution.

In 1980, a segment of the Grove-Shafter Freeway was renamed the William Byron Rumford freeway in his honor. The postal station at the Oakland federal building is named for him, as is a senior housing community in Berkeley. His archives are housed at the African American Museum and Library, a research center operated by the Oakland Public Library.

Mable Howard - (February 3, 1905 – March 29, 1994) - Community activist - In the 1960s, the city of Berkeley planned to build new BART tracks that would run above ground through South Berkeley, where much of the city’s Black population is based. Howard, a local activist who moved from Galveston, Texas during World War II to work in the shipyards, feared BART would disrupt the neighborhood and tank property values. So Howard spearheaded litigation to halt the construction of the tracks for nine months, until BART agreed to build the line underground. A subsidized housing complex for seniors was later named after Howard for her contributions to South Berkeley. Howard is also the mother of artist Mildred Howard.

Mildred Howard - (born 1945) - Visual artist - Mildred is an African-American artist known primarily for her sculptural installation and mixed-media assemblages. Her work has been shown at galleries in Boston, Los Angeles and New York City, internationally at venues in Berlin, Cairo, London, Paris, and Venice, and at institutions including the Oakland Museum of California, the de Young Museum, SFMOMA, the San Jose Museum of Art and the Museum of the African Diaspora. Howard was born in 1945 to Rolly and Mable Howard in San Francisco, California, and raised in South Berkeley, California. Howard has created numerous public installation works in the Bay Area and beyond. In 2017, a rent increase forced her to move out of the Berkeley, CA, studio where she had lived and worked for 18 years.

== See also ==
- Lorin District
- U.S. Geological Survey Geographic Names Information System: South Berkeley, Berkeley, California
- Berkeley Heritage Association
- Berkeley Historical Society
