= Erna P. Harris =

American writer and activist (1908–1995)

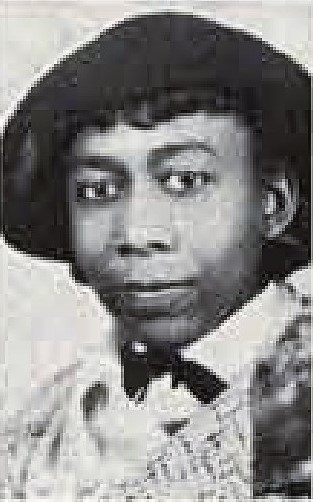
- Harris in her signature beret, 1933
- Born: Erna Prather Harris; June 29, 1908; Kingfisher, Oklahoma, US
- Died: March 9, 1995 (aged 86); Berkeley, California, US
- Education: Wichita State University
- Occupations: Journalist; activist; pacifist
- Years active: 1936–1980s

Erna Prather Harris (June 29, 1908 – March 9, 1995) was an American journalist, businesswoman, and activist, known for her pacifism. Born in Oklahoma, she grew up in the segregated South and attended Black schools. After graduating from Douglass High School in Kingfisher, Oklahoma, she worked as a maid to earn enough money to attend an integrated university. Graduating from Wichita State University in 1936, and unable to find work, she opened her own newspaper, The Kansas Journal.

The Kansas Journal was a successful Black publication until 1939, when she lost her advertisers because of an editorial she wrote opposing the draft. Moving to California, she worked as an editor for the Los Angeles Tribune, writing articles about racist policies such as segregation of blood supplies, immigration, and the internment of Japanese Americans during World War II. She led protests in the 1940s against segregation in the military and in favor of conscientious objection. After being targeted by the FBI and McCarthyism, she criticized the House Un-American Activities Committee's activities. In the 1950s, she moved to Seattle, where she published a journal, Bias, advocating for peaceful cooperation, before moving to Berkeley, California, and operating a duplication and printing shop until her retirement.

Harris joined numerous pacifist organizations, including the Fellowship of Reconciliation, the Congress of Racial Equality, the Workers' Defense League, and the Women's International League for Peace and Freedom (WILPF). She served as chair of the Berkeley branch of the WILPF in 1956, was twice appointed as a regional vice president of the national section and served on the national WILPF executive board. As a member of the WILPF's Civil Rights Committee, she was instrumental in pressing the organization to support school integration after the Supreme Court decision Brown v. Board of Education and boycotts against companies supporting South African Apartheid. She was a delegate at three of WILPF's international congresses, 1956, 1965, and 1971.

Harris supported World Federalism as a means to maintain global peace, and attended a US–USSR summit in 1964 to promote cooperation between women. Involved in many issues, she opposed nuclear proliferation, Cuban isolationism, intervention in Latin America, the Vietnam War, California Proposition 6, and discrimination of any kind. In her later years, she became involved in the Consumers' Cooperative of Berkeley and the Gray Panthers. As a board member of the cooperative, she helped plan the 1978 expansion of the organization to include a credit union, funeral and travel services and a public housing project. After her death in 1995, the City of Berkeley named a housing project the Erna P. Harris Court in her honor.

== Early life and education ==
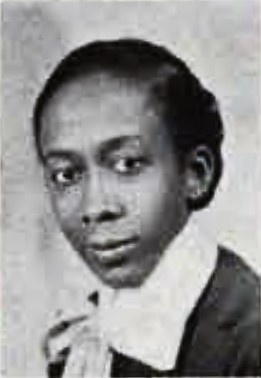
Harris in university, 1935

Erna Prather Harris was born on June 29, 1908, in Kingfisher, Oklahoma, to Frances A. "Frankie" (née Prather) and James E. Harris. Her father was a postman. As a pacifist and an admirer of Mahatma Gandhi, he influenced his daughter's later activism. Unlike most men in his community, he did not own a gun, but he routinely opposed the actions of the local Ku Klux Klan. She attended segregated schools and graduated from Douglass High School in Kingfisher in 1926. As she did not want to continue her education in a segregated setting, after graduation Harris worked as a domestic to earn enough money to attend an out-of-state integrated university. She enrolled at Wichita State University, majoring in journalism and minoring in religion, sociology, and Spanish. She began wearing a beret, later a signature part of her style, in university because men's hats were less expensive than women's headwear. Harris was a reporter on the college press, The Sunflower, and while a freshman was the first woman to win a journalism prize. The paper won an award from the Collegiate Press Association while she was an editor during her senior year. She was the only Black student in the journalism department and its first Black graduate when she earned her bachelor's degree in 1936.

== Career ==
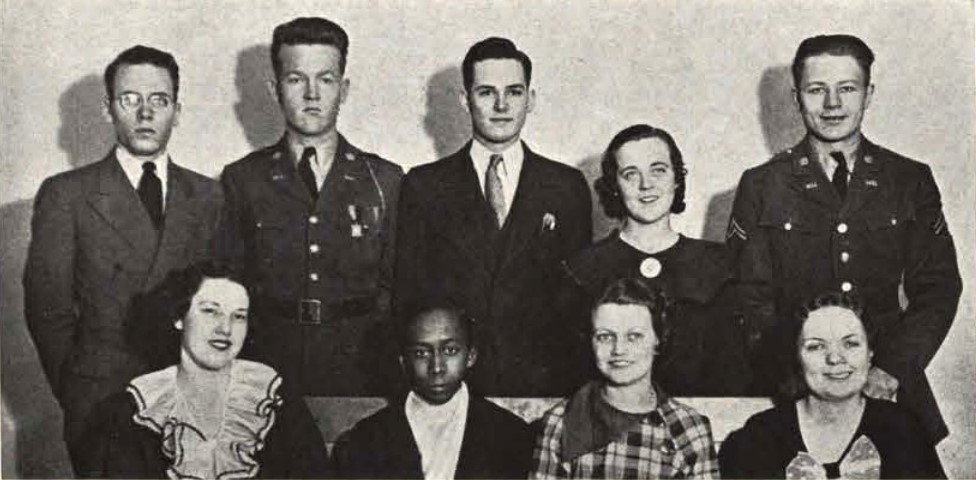
(Harris, in the middle), Sunflower staff 1935

Unable to find employment, Harris borrowed $25 from a friend and started her own newspaper, The Kansas Journal. One of the few Black press publications in the area, the weekly paper focused on issues in the community. For over three years, she built subscriptions from over 500 readers but an editorial opposing the draft, written in 1939, caused her to lose many of her advertisers and the paper closed. She moved to California and began working as an editor for the Los Angeles Tribune. The paper, which predominantly served LA's Black community, was known for its coverage confronting racism. She wrote feature articles and had a syndicated column, "Reflections in a Crackt Mirror" that was distributed to other markets.

Harris wrote columns over the duration of World War II against Japanese-American internments, equating the government's actions as an official sanction of prejudice and warning that such discrimination could spread to other communities like Jews, Mexican Americans, and other Asians. She also wrote about the policies of segregating blood in use by the American Red Cross, staunchly supported open-immigration policies to assist people fleeing Nazi persecution, and opposed development of nuclear weapons. Her articles brought her under attack by Westbrook Pegler, a fellow journalist, and to the attention of the FBI, who tapped the newspaper's phone and examined her mail. Regardless of the opposition to her positions, Harris spoke out against investigations by the House Un-American Activities Committee and McCarthyism.

After eight years in Los Angeles, Harris moved to Seattle, Washington, and lived there for several years, continuing her journalism career. Along with Dorothy Fisk, she published Bias, a journal advocating peace and cooperation. In 1952, she moved to Berkeley where she operated a duplication and printing shop until her retirement.

== Activism ==
In the early 1940s, when Harris moved to Los Angeles, she joined the Fellowship of Reconciliation, a pacifist organization, and became active in its activities. She also joined the Congress of Racial Equality (CORE), which advocated the development of communication and friendship as opposed to direct action, as the means to achieve racial equality. Along with other CORE members and pacifist groups she worked to assist conscientious objectors by raising funds to pay the bail bonds of resisters and publicize the issue. She became an associate secretary in the Workers' Defense League in 1945. Three years later, she was one of the local leaders in the movement against segregation in the military, holding demonstrations and protests. To keep his campaign promises and end the pressure by the Black community, President Harry S. Truman, signed Executive Order 9981 in June 1948 to integrate the United States Armed Forces. Harris joined the Women's International League for Peace and Freedom (WILPF) in 1954. Along with Bertha McNeill and Bessie McLaurin, she led the Civil Rights Committee of the national branch of WILPF. As soon as the decision for Brown v. Board of Education (1954) was issued by the Supreme Court, the committee began pressuring WILPF to openly support the ruling and help in enforcing school desegregation through rallies and demonstrations. Similarly, she led WILPF to adopt a policy of opposition to apartheid in South Africa, linking racial inequality to global discontent, which could lead to war. Part of the organization's response was to promote product boycotts against companies that supported segregation.

Harris was elected chair of the Berkeley WILPF branch in 1956 and appointed to the national WILPF Executive Board the same year. She was selected as a delegate for the international congress held in July in Birmingham, England, and the following month went with other women activists to attend the Commonwealth of World Citizens meeting at the Temple of Peace in Cardiff, Wales. The idea of world citizenship typically included World Federalism and maintenance of peace through global laws. Harris continued to support world governance, attending a conference in Wolfach, Germany, in 1968. She made headlines, when she was chosen as one of twelve delegates to go to the Soviet Union in 1964 for a US-USSR summit on women's cooperation and peace initiatives. Of all the issues discussed at the conference, Harris felt that the most important was global nuclear disarmament. Both the WILPF and Harris shared the view that Communist nations should be integrated in global affairs, but that the United States should not interfere in their internal affairs. To that end, she opposed the United States policy of Cuban isolationism, intervention in Latin America, and the Vietnam War.

Harris was twice elected as the southwestern regional vice president of WILPF and was a delegate to the 1965 International WILPF Congress in The Hague, Netherlands, and the 1971 congress in New Delhi, India. During discussions in New Delhi, a philosophical divide emerged in the midst of world-wide social unrest at the end of the 1960s. On one side were absolute pacifists and on the other were those who believed that armed liberation movements were acceptable when people's human rights were repressed. Some members took the position that if there was no other way to avoid oppression or exploitation, violence was unavoidable. Harris, in speaking on the issue said, "I support liberation, all kinds of liberation. And one of them is liberation from the notion that you can release violence on the world and not reap what you sow". Ultimately, the WILPF endorsed a resolution of non-violence, but recognized that violent resistance was inevitable if all other measures failed to resolve inequalities caused by the power hierarchies of a society.

In the 1970s, Harris became involved in the cooperative movement. From 1978 to 1983, she was on the board of directors of the Berkeley Cooperative, the largest such organization in the country. She and fellow activist Matt Crawford, solicited community input and assisted the city in planning the renovation of the University Avenue Cooperative, part of the Consumers' Cooperative of Berkeley. The remodeling took more than two years to complete and cost $1 million, of which ninety percent was member-funded. When completed in 1978, the consumers' co-operative included a credit union, as well as funeral and travel services, and Harris was one of the speakers at the dedication. Seeking to further serve the community, the cooperative simultaneously made plans to develop a mixed-income housing cooperative on the adjacent property. In March, for their community work, she and Mable Howard both received Doctor of Humane Letters degrees from the Center for Urban Black Studies, affiliated with the Graduate Theological Union of Berkeley. Ron Dellums, a California representative for the U.S. House, noted that she continued her activism for human rights regardless of whether her positions were popular. She spoke in opposition to the passage of California Proposition 6, which would have barred LGBT teachers, and legislation that permitted discrimination for having different ideologies. From the early 1980s, Harris was active with the Gray Panthers, an organization advocating for the rights of senior citizens.

== Death and legacy ==
Harris died on March 9, 1995, in Berkeley. After her death, the City of Berkeley named the Erna P. Harris Court, a public housing project located at 1330 University Avenue, in her honor. She is remembered for her outspoken criticism of racism and discrimination of any kind against minority populations, and in particular, her opposition to the treatment of the Japanese-American community. Academic Greg Robinson stated, "Although less renowned a figure than [George] Schuyler or [Langston] Hughes, she proved the most forthright and fearless critic among African American columnists of the treatment of Japanese Americans". Her papers are located in Kenneth Spencer Research Library at the University of Kansas and the African American Museum and Library at Oakland in California. An oral interview of Harris was taken in 1985 by Judith Porter Adams and is housed in the Women's International League for Peace and Freedom Collection in the Archive of Recorded Sound at Stanford University. Excerpts of the interview were published in the book Peacework: Oral Histories of Women Peace Activists in 1991.
