= Shotgun Players =

Theatre group in Berkeley, California

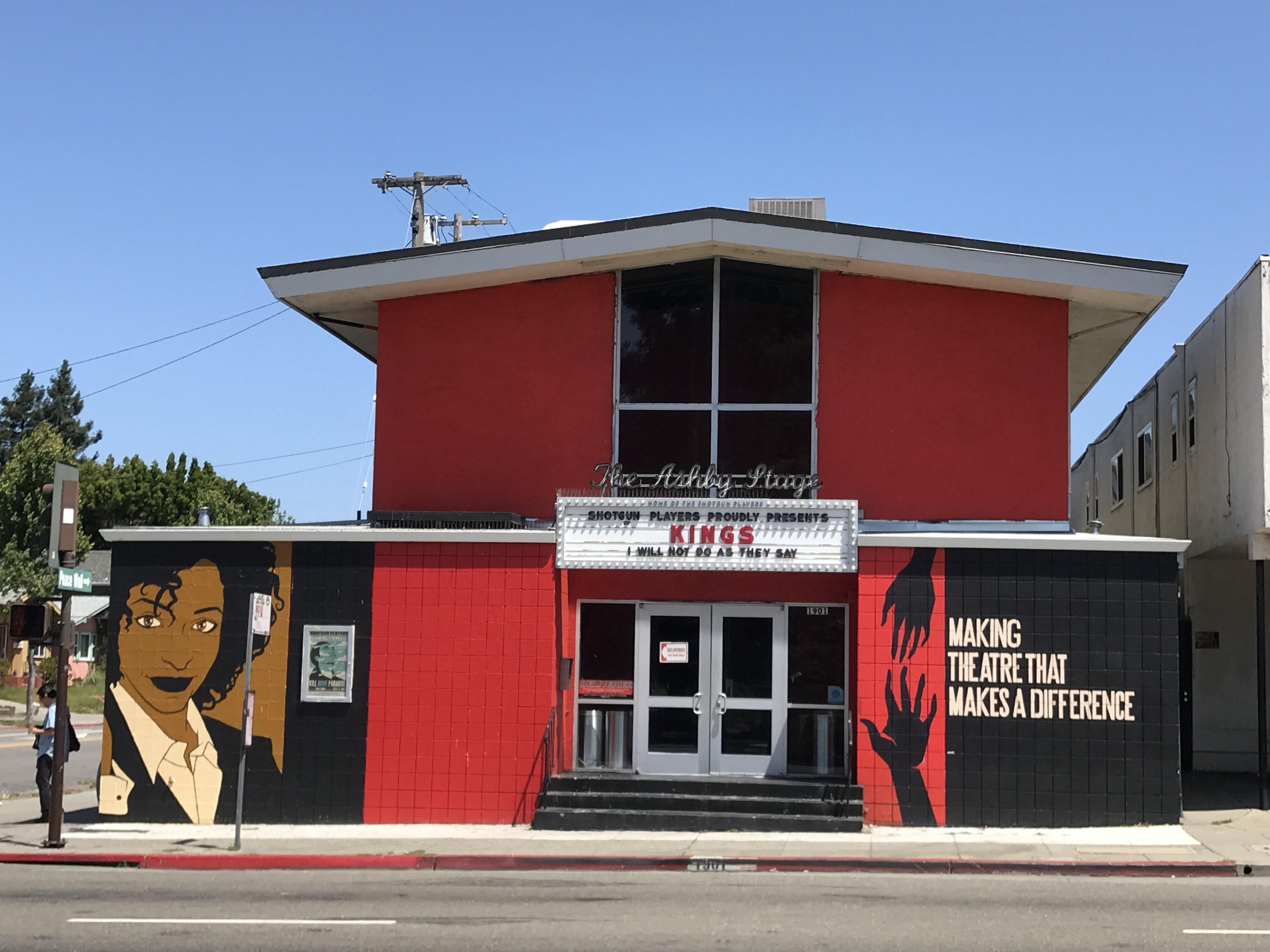
- Interactive map of Shotgun Players
- Address: 1901 Ashby Avenue; Berkeley, California; United States
- Coordinates: 37°51′16.48″N 122°16′15.3″W
- Public transit: Ashby
- Type: Regional theater
- Capacity: Ashby Stage: 119

Construction
- Opened: 1992 (company); 2004: The Ashby Stage; 2015: The Shotgun Studios

Website
- www.shotgunplayers.org

The Shotgun Players is a California East Bay regional theatre group located in Berkeley, California. It runs 6 to 7 productions per season. Its main stage is the Ashby Stage located in the Lorin District near the Ashby BART station.

== About ==
The Shotgun Players was founded in 1992 by Artistic Director Patrick Dooley. Dooley and ten other actors formed the company in La Val's Pizza Shop. Before moving to a permanent location at the Ashby Stage in 2004, Shotgun Players performed in 44 different spaces. In December 2007, the Shotgun Players' Ashby Stage performance space in Berkeley's Lorin District became the first live theater venue in the nation to convert fully to solar power. The Ashby Stage hosts all main stage shows and the Champagne Staged Reading Series. With donations from the community, Shotgun Players bought 1201 University Ave, which was previously Serendipity Books, and converted the building into a rehearsal studio and workshop in 2015. In addition to rehearsing Shotgun Players' own productions, the Shotgun Studios is a rehearsal space and creative hub for emerging performing arts groups.

== Production history ==
Since 1992, Shotgun Players has produced over 140 plays, 30 of which were newly commissioned works.

=== Main Stage Shows ===
Shotgun Players has one season per year and produces an average of 6 shows per season. In 2015, Shotgun Players announced a season of all works by women playwrights, including 6 full productions and 6 staged readings. In 2016, the company presented its season in repertory to celebrate its 25th anniversary.

=== Notable Productions ===
- Arcadia by Tom Stoppard (2018)
- Natasha, Pierre & The Great Comet of 1812 by Dave Malloy (2022)
- Thirty-Six by Leah Nanako Winkler (2023)
- Iron Shoes (2018) - a collaboration between Shotgun Players and Kitka Women's Vocal Ensemble
- The Black Rider: The Casting of the Magic Bullets (2017) - contributions from Tom Waits, William S. Burroughs, and Robert Wilson
- Shipwreck by Tom Stoppard (2013)
- Woyzeck by Georg Büchner (2012)
- Bonnie & Clyde by Adam Peck (2013)

== See also ==
- American Conservatory Theater, San Francisco, California
- Marin Theatre Company, Mill Valley, California
- Berkeley Repertory Theatre, Berkeley, California
- TheatreWorks, Palo Alto, California
- San Francisco Playhouse, San Francisco, California
- Aurora Theatre, Berkeley, California
