= Melanie Lomax =

American lawyer (1950–2006)

Melanie Elizabeth Lomax (April 12, 1950 – September 10, 2006), was a civil rights lawyer and former head of the Los Angeles Board of Police Commissioners.

Lomax was the daughter of Lucius W. Lomax, Jr. (1910–1973), an attorney, and Hallie Almena Davis Lomax (1915–2011), a civil rights activist and editor of the Los Angeles Tribune. A native of Los Angeles, California, Lomax grew up in the Arlington Heights neighborhood. She graduated from the University of California, Berkeley, and Loyola Law School in Los Angeles.

In the early 1960s, her mother took her to visit the segregated South, an experience which had a lasting effect on Melanie, who decided to focus on civil rights instead of following her father into criminal law. In 1975, she started working for the Los Angeles County Counsel's office, defending county agencies in labor and civil matters. She founded her own firm in 1984, specializing in age, sex and racial discrimination cases.

Appointed by Mayor Tom Bradley, Lomax was the first black woman to lead the Los Angeles Police Commission, which she headed when motorist Rodney King was beaten by four officers of the Los Angeles Police Department. She won many friends and enemies in its aftermath, when she waged a high-profile battle to oust controversial Police Chief Daryl F. Gates in an effort to transform the department's culture. Melanie was also responsible for the Emergency Preparedness and Maintenance of LAX. Melanie was also Defense Counsel for the Veterans Administration and the Los Angeles County Metropolitan Transit Authority at the time of her death. Her brother, Michael L. Lomax, is president and CEO of the United Negro College Fund.
