= Mildred Howard =

American visual artist (born 1945)

- Howard in 2016
- Born: 1945 (age 80–81); San Francisco, California, U.S.
- Education: College of Alameda; John F. Kennedy University
- Occupation: Mixed Media Artist
- Years active: 1965 – present
- Known for: Painting, drawing, environmental sculpture, installation
- Mother: Mable Howard

Mildred Howard (born 1945) is an African-American artist known primarily for her sculptural installation and mixed-media assemblages. Her work has been shown at galleries in Boston, Los Angeles and New York, internationally at venues in Berlin, Cairo, London, Paris, and Venice, and at institutions including the Oakland Museum of California, the de Young Museum, SFMOMA, the San Jose Museum of Art, and the Museum of the African Diaspora. Howard's work is held in the permanent collections of numerous institutions, including the San Francisco Museum of Modern Art, the Oakland Museum of California, and the Ulrich Museum of Art.

== Early life and education ==
Howard was born in 1945 to Rolly and Mable Howard in San Francisco, California, and raised in South Berkeley, California. Howard's parents had an antiques business and were politically active in labor unions, civil rights struggles and other community issues. Howard has lived in Berkeley since 1949. She was a member of SNCC and CORE and participated as a youth in protests against segregation in Berkeley schools.

She received an Associate of Arts degree and Certificate in Fashion Arts from the College of Alameda in 1977. Howard continued her studies and received an MFA degree in 1985 from the Fiberworks Center from the Textile Arts at John F. Kennedy University that was located in Orinda, California.

== Career ==
Howard began her adult creative life as a dancer, before working in visual art. In the early 1980s, Howard's installations took the form of manipulated windows from storefronts and churches. They later evolved into constructed habitats that provided walk-in environments. For example, in 1990 Howard created a house made of engraved bottles and sand in the atrium of the Afro-American Museum in Los Angeles; this work was inspired by the book Autobiography of an Ex-Colored Man by James Weldon Johnson and makes visual reference to the bottle houses that Johnson describes in the book. In 2005, she fabricated and installed a house made of red glass at the Museum of Glass in Tacoma, Washington. In 2019, Howard's work "TAP: Investigation of Memory" was exhibited at the Oakland Museum of California. The exhibit was a powerful multimedia installation that examines themes of identity, church culture, gentrification, dance, activism, and more.

Howard has created numerous public installation works in the Bay Area, including Three Shades of Blue, a collaboration with poet Quincy Troupe on the Fillmore Street bridge, and The Music of Language on Glide Memorial's family housing building on Mason Street, both in San Francisco.

Howard's work has long dealt with themes of home and belonging. In 2017, a rent increase forced her to move out of the Berkeley (CA) studio where she had lived and worked for 18 years. This made themes of home all the more poignant in her work, and led her to deeper explorations of the effects of gentrification and displacement. Howard is not shy about incorporating activism or politics into her work, though she is conscious of the divide between art and activism. She states, "[Changing the world] is up to the people who look at [my art]. I'm hoping they will feel something as a result of looking at the work... It's what the viewer and the spectator brings to the work."

Though Howard's pieces most often speak to broader social concerns, she occasionally incorporates autobiographical references into her work. Works such as Flying Low (2006) and Thirty-Eight Double Dee (1995) reference the death of her son. In her installation titled In the Line of Fire, she utilizes an old photograph of one of her own relatives to signify young soldiers of color in the early 20th century.

On December 17, 2025, the Oakland Museum of California announced that it would mount a retrospective of Howard’s career titled, “Mildred Howard: Poetics of Memory” from June 12–October 11, 2026. The exhibition will include new works and be accompanied by an illustrated catalog.

== Awards and honors ==
In 1991, Howard received the Adaline Kent Award from the San Francisco Art Institute for her installation Ten Little Children (one got shot and then there were nine), a work representing a cemetery inspired by the Soweto massacre.

She has been the recipient of two Rockefeller Fellowships to Bellagio in Triangolo lariano, Italy, (1996 and 2007); the Joan Mitchell Award; an NEA Fellowship in Sculpture; and the Flintridge Foundation Award for Visual Art.

In 2011, Howard was honored at Berkeley City Hall Chambers where Berkeley mayor Tom Bates officially declared Tuesday, March 29, 2011 to be Mildred Howard Day. In 2012, Howard received a SPUR Award, described as San Francisco's "largest and most prominent annual civic award", from the San Francisco Planning and Urban Research Association.

In May 2023, Howard was awarded an Honorary Doctorate of Humane Letters by California State University, East Bay

In April 2025, Howard was announced as a Guggenheim Fellow.

== Other work ==
In the late 1990s, Howard was selected by Alice Waters to serve as executive director of The Edible Schoolyard, Waters's garden at Martin Luther King Middle School in Berkeley, which offered middle school-aged youth hands-on education in the garden and the kitchen with a focus on sustainable agriculture.

Howard has also managed an art and communities program at the Exploratorium in San Francisco, California, where she developed curriculum aimed at integrating art and science for elementary and middle school teachers. She has worked at Alameda County Juvenile Hall and in various Bay Area jails, and has served as a cultural ambassador to Morocco, where she gave a series of lectures sponsored by the U.S. State Department. She has taught at Stanford and Brown Universities, the San Francisco Art Institute, and the California College of the Arts.

In 2018, Mildred and her mother, Mable Howard, were the focus of a 26-minute documentary titled: Welcome to the Neighborhood, that examined the conditions surrounding an African-American family facing gentrification and a housing crisis that threatens South Berkeley's diversity.

== Related quotes ==
In Sculpture magazine, art historian Peter Selz writes:

Over the course of four decades, Mildred Howard has created rich and evocative work, taking common objects of daily life and infusing them with a spark that illuminates the underlying significance and historical weight of cultural forms. In freestanding sculptures, wall-mounted musings, graphic explorations, and representations of shelter, she has developed a language to address racism, injustice, need, and compassion. What sets her work apart from much politically engaged art is its grace and elegance.

Art critic Kenneth Baker of the San Francisco Chronicle describes Howard's practice as follows:

Mildred Howard takes full advantage of the latitude that modernism won for artists in the use of materials and expressive idioms. She has used photographs, glass, architecture, housewares and other found objects of all kinds. Because she maneuvers so freely within the conceptually soft borders of 'installation' work, people tend to think of her as a sculptor, but she prefers the vaguer, more open term artist.

Art in America′s Leah Ollman writes:

Howard ... has worked in assemblage, collage and installation for more than a decade, but her real medium is memory, which permeates her work with vitality and poignancy.

== Publications ==
- King-Hammond, with an introduction by Leslie (1995). "Mildred Howard". Gumbo Ya Ya: Anthology of Contemporary African-American Women Artists. New York: Midmarch Arts Press. pp. 112–113. ISBN 978-1-877-67507-2. OCLC 32157945.

== Gallery of artwork by Mildred Howard ==
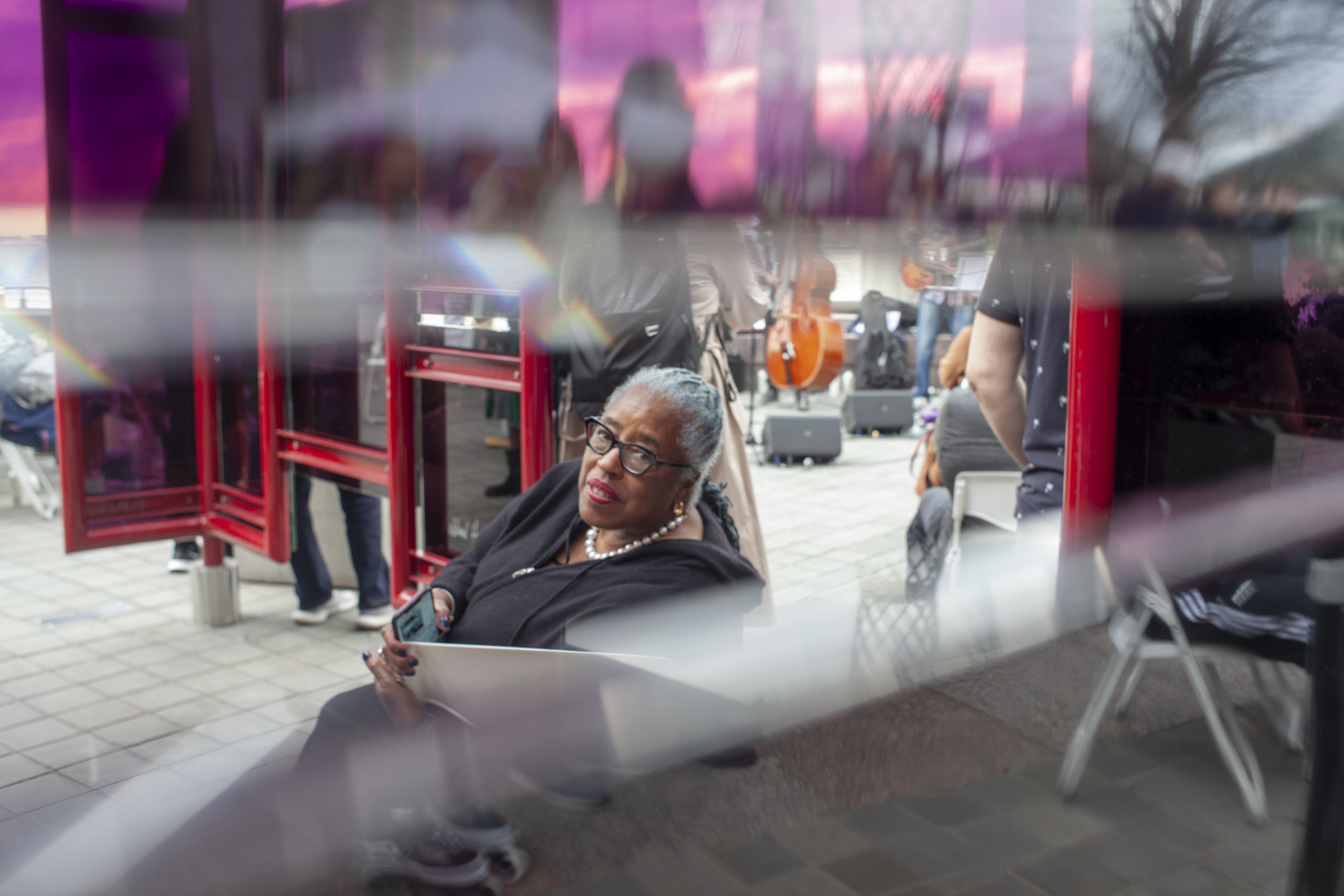
Mildred Howard inside The House That Will Not Pass for Any Color Than Its Own, April 2022

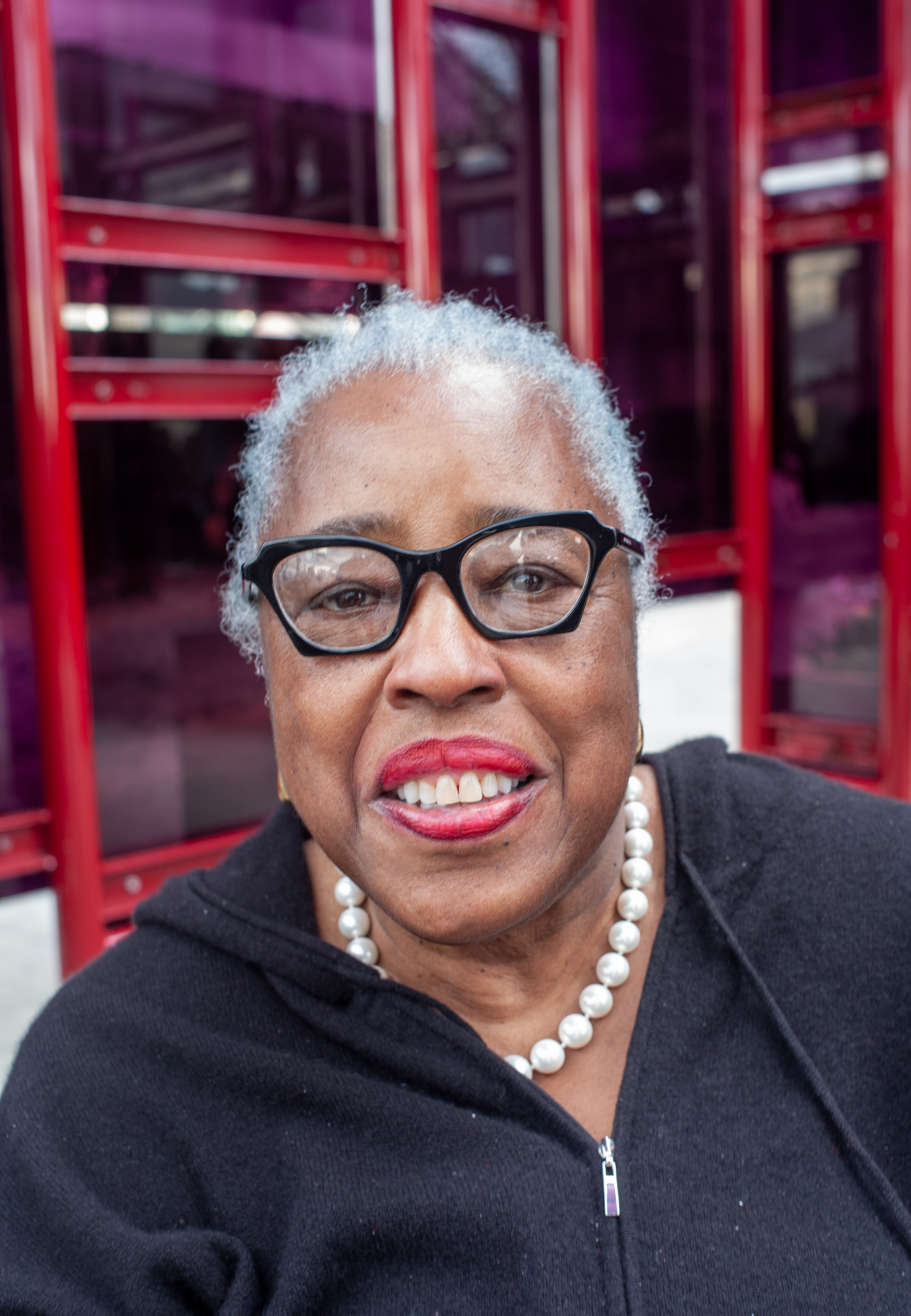
Howard - 2022
