= 1993 Atlanta mayoral election =

- November 2, 1993 (general); November 23, 1993 (runoff)
- Turnout: 44.52% (general); 36.40% (runoff)
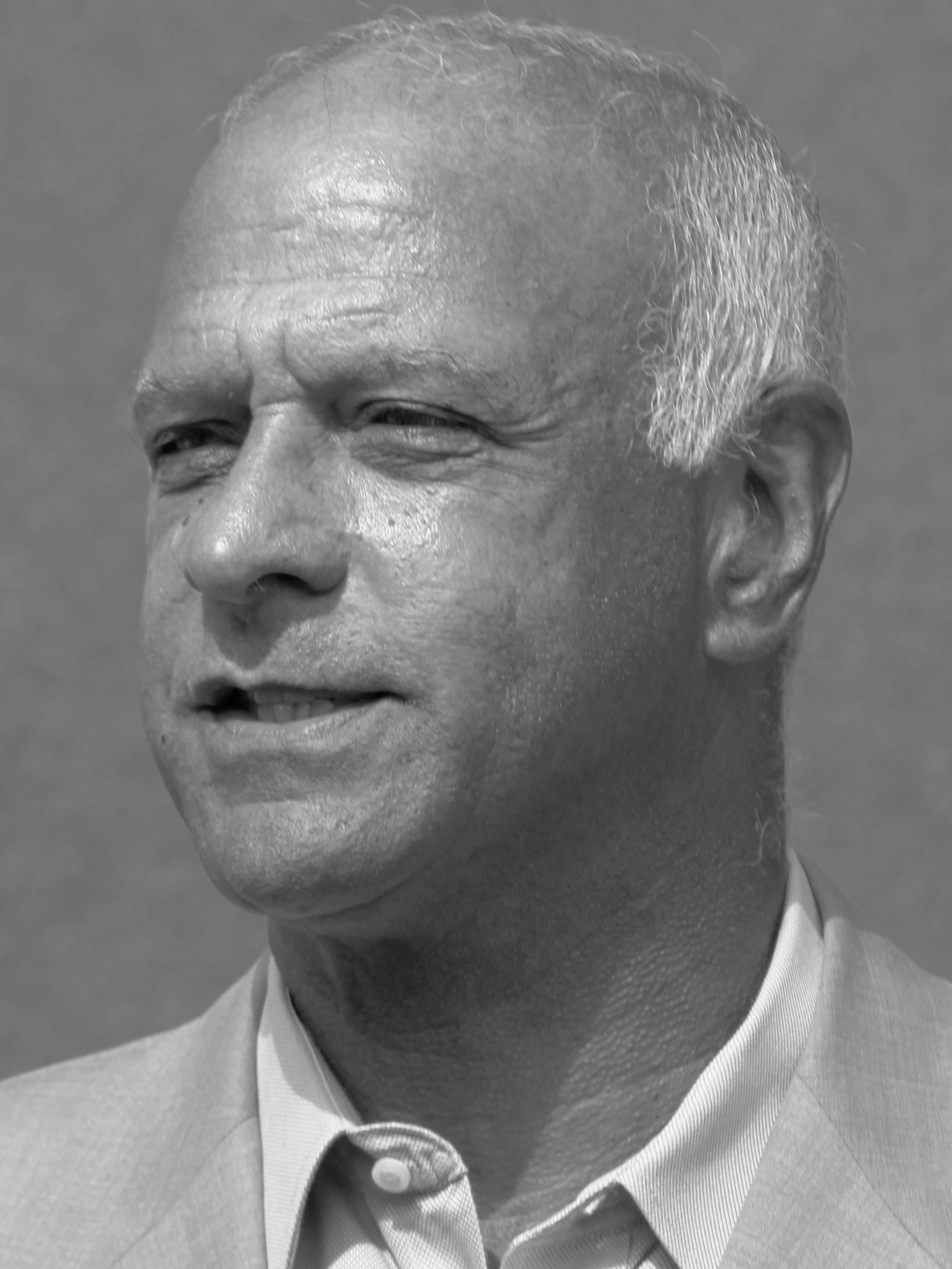

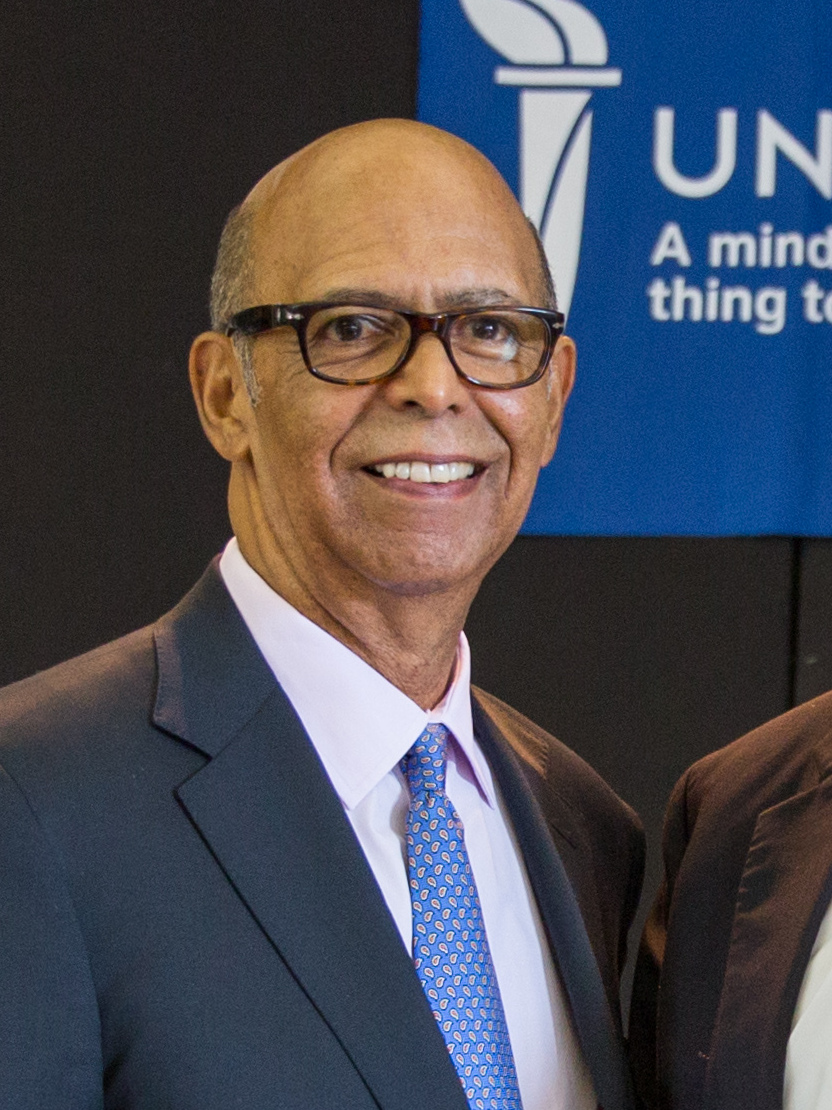
| Candidate | Bill Campbell | Michael Lomax |
| Party | Nonpartisan | Nonpartisan |
| First-round vote | 39,997 | 18,900 |
| First-round percentage | 48.98% | 23.15% |
| Second-round vote | 48,600 | 18,155 |
| Second-round percentage | 72.80% | 27.20% |
| Candidate | Myrtle Davis | Nancy Schaefer |
| Party | Nonpartisan | Nonpartisan |
| First-round vote | 12,779 | 9,057 |
| First-round percentage | 15.65% | 11.09% |
Mayor before election
Maynard Jackson
Democratic
Elected mayor
Bill Campbell
Democratic

The 1993 Atlanta mayoral election occurred on November 2, 1993, with a runoff election held on November 23, 1993.

Incumbent mayor Maynard Jackson declined to seek reelection to what would have been a fourth overall (and second consecutive) term, citing family and personal reasons.

Since no candidate received a majority in the general election, a runoff election was held between the top-two finishers. Bill Campbell won election in the runoff.

== Candidates ==
Advanced to runoff

- Bill Campbell, Atlanta city councilor
- Michael Lomax, former chairman of the Fulton County Board of Commissioners and 1989 mayoral candidate

Eliminated in general election

- A. Amenra
- Bob Braxton
- James A. Coleman
- Myrtle Davis, Atlanta city councilor
- John Genins
- David Librace
- Lafayette Perry
- Nancy Smith Schaefer, activist
- Mark Teal
- Mitchell Williams

== Campaign ==
=== General election ===
The election would determine who would, expectedly, serve as mayor during the upcoming 1996 Summer Olympics in the city. Among the issues that the individual elected mayor would inherit would be an Olympics that were considered significantly behind-schedule in regards to planning.

Peter Applebome of The New York Times, on October 15, 1993, characterized the races being largely between Campbell, Davis, and Lomax, in which Campbell was leading, and Lomax was likely to place second. Applebome wrote, "the three have mounted a civilized, relatively low-key race in which polls show Mr. Campbell with a healthy lead" Applebome also wrote that the candidates had waged an "issue-oriented race".

Crime was a major topic of the campaign. Campbell proposed reorganizing the city's police department, placing more officers in the city's neighborhoods, and rehiring retired officers to give more staffing flexibility (while costing less to train then new officers). Lomax proposed hiring 400 new police officers. Davis focused more on addressing the social causes behind crime.

Outgoing mayor Maynard Jackson endorsed Campbell.

Lomax had high name-recognition, but also had high disapproval in opinion polling.

=== Runoff ===
Observers considered the runoff campaign between Campbell and Lomax as having been ugly. Instead of being issues-focused, the campaign became focused on questions that Lomax made regarding Campbell's ties to a federal corruption probe and questionable expenditures at Hartsfield International Airport.

== Results ==
=== General election (November 2) ===
Atlanta mayoral general election, 1993
| Party | Candidate | Votes | % |
|---|---|---|---|
| Nonpartisan | Bill Campbell | 39,997 | 48.98 |
| Nonpartisan | Michael L. Lomax | 18,900 | 23.15 |
| Nonpartisan | Myrtle Davis | 12,779 | 15.65 |
| Nonpartisan | Nancy Smith Schaefer | 9,057 | 11.09 |
| Nonpartisan | A. Amenra | 230 | 0.28 |
| Nonpartisan | James A. Coleman | 216 | 0.27 |
| Nonpartisan | Bob Braxton | 124 | 0.15 |
| Nonpartisan | David Librace | 83 | 0.10 |
| Nonpartisan | Mark Teal | 72 | 0.09 |
| Nonpartisan | John Genins | 69 | 0.09 |
| Nonpartisan | Lafayette Perry | 66 | 0.08 |
| Nonpartisan | Mitchell Williams | 62 | 0.08 |
| Turnout | | 81,655 | 44.52 |

=== Runoff (November 23) ===
Atlanta mayoral runoff election, 1993
| Party | Candidate | Votes | % |
|---|---|---|---|
| Nonpartisan | Bill Campbell | 48,600 | 72.80 |
| Nonpartisan | Michael L. Lomax | 18,155 | 27.20 |
| Turnout | | 66,755 | 36.40 |
