= Los Angeles Tribune (1941–1960) =

Newspaper published from 1941 to 1960

The Los Angeles Tribune was a newspaper published in by Almena Lomax, a civil rights activist, between 1941 and 1960, for principally the African-American residents of Los Angeles. The paper was known for its "fearless reporting," including articles about racism in the Los Angeles Police Department. Just after World War II, Hisaye Yamamoto wrote for the paper.

Erna P. Harris was an editor and writer for the Tribune. She wrote about racist policies like segregation of blood supplies, immigration, and the internment of Japanese Americans during World War II.
