= Almena Lomax =

American journalist

- Born: Almena Davis; July 23, 1915; Galveston, Texas, US
- Died: March 25, 2011 (aged 95); Pasadena, California, US
- Education: Los Angeles City College
- Occupation: Journalist
- Employer: Los Angeles Tribune
- Spouse(s): Lucius W. Lomax, Jr.

Hallie Almena Lomax (née Davis) (July 23, 1915 – March 25, 2011) was an African American journalist and civil rights activist.

== Early life ==
Lomax was born in Galveston, Texas. Her parents, Clifford and Geneva Davis, moved the family to Chicago when Almena was a child, and that is where she and her sister were raised. Her family subsequently moved to Los Angeles, where she graduated from Jordan High School in the Watts neighborhood of South Los Angeles. She briefly studied journalism at Los Angeles City College, however, she did not graduate and left school to go to work full-time in journalism. Her first job was at the California Eagle, where she worked from 1935 to 1941. She joined a church newspaper, the Interfaith Churchman in early 1941; after she purchased it for fifty dollars, this newspaper morphed into the Los Angeles Tribune.

== Career ==
In 1941, Lomax started the Los Angeles Tribune, a weekly newspaper targeted at the African-American community, which she ran with her former husband, Lucius W. Lomax, Jr. (1910–73). He was the publisher and she was the editor. She also wrote a weekly opinion column. In 1946, she was one of three winners of the Wendell Willkie Award, established to honor the best black journalists in the United States. During the Civil Rights Movement of the 1960s, she left California, with her children, to join the struggle in the South. Later she returned to California, where she worked at the San Francisco Chronicle and the San Francisco Examiner. As a reporter, she covered such topics as the kidnapping of Patty Hearst.

Lomax was a contestant on the 3rd March 1955 edition of You Bet Your Life, hosted by Groucho Marx, alongside Joe Louis.

== Personal life ==
Lomax, a divorcee, had six children, four of whom survived her. One of her surviving children is Michael L. Lomax, former chairman of the Fulton County (Ga.) Commission, former president of Dillard University, one of the historically black colleges, in New Orleans, La., and current president and CEO of the United Negro College Fund. Lomax was predeceased by two daughters, Michele L. Lomax, a San Francisco film critic and journalist, who died in 1987, and Los Angeles civil rights lawyer Melanie E. Lomax, who died in 2006.

Baptized Catholic, Lomax was later a noted agnostic.
