= Mable Howard =

American community leader

Mable "Mama" Howard
- Born: February 3, 1905; Van Vleck, Texas
- Died: March 29, 1994 (aged 89); Berkeley, California
- Other names: Mama Howard, 'Ma Howard
- Occupations: Ship Painter, Community Activist
- Known for: pushing BART underground within Berkeley city limits
- Spouse: Rolly Howard (m. 1921)
- Children: 10, including Mildred Howard

Mable "Mama" Howard (February 3, 1905 - March 29, 1994, Berkeley, California) was a humanitarian, political activist, union activist, and civic leader.

== Early life ==
Born Mable Daisy Shrock on February 3, 1905, in Van Vleck, Texas, a small town in Matagorda County, near the Gulf of Mexico. She attended a boarding school in Conroe, Texas, where she organized the students to create a student government, which, once established, Howard became the first student body president of. Mable was politically active throughout her life.

== BART Lawsuit ==
In the 1960s, Mable fought against a proposed above-ground BART rail system that was to divide her community. She helped preserve the undivided quality of life in South Berkeley by spearheading an effort to underground the line that would have divided and degraded the neighborhood.

Howard filed a lawsuit, and eventually BART agreed to move the line underground.

In her honor, a subsidized rental complex for seniors was named the Mable Howard Apartments, located on Alcatraz Avenue.

== Life ==
In 1921, Mable Shrock married Rolly Howard and shortly thereafter moved to Galveston, Texas, where he worked as a longshoreman by day, and with her in their antique shop by night, while they raised nine children. Rolly & Mable moved to the Bay Area during World War II to work for Bethlehem Steel at the Alameda Works Shipyard. Mable worked as a ship painter and Rolly continued his work as a longshoreman. She was the first black woman admitted to the Painter's Union. After gaining admittance, Howard assisted in getting other women into the union. Her union work earned her the respect and friendship of labor leader Harry Bridges. Furthermore, through her union activity, Mable maintained a working relationship with the ILWU for over 30 years.

In 1947, Mable and Rolly moved their family, now with ten kids, to South Berkeley, Berkeley, California, a mixed neighborhood. Mable Howard was called Mama Howard in part because she politically nurtured many prominent civic leaders. Her home became an open meeting place for the socially active and politically inclined in the area. She continued with her social and community activities her entire life and believed she could save the world. Mable is quoted as saying: "If I could put my arms around the whole world I would!"

In 1978, at the age of 73, Mable received an honorary degree, a Doctor of Humane Letters, from the Center for Urban Black Studies.

In 2018, Mable and her daughter Mildred Howard were the focus of a 26-minute documentary titled Welcome to the Neighborhood, that examined the conditions surrounding an African-American family facing gentrification and a housing crisis that threatens South Berkeley's diversity.

There are currently multiple civic efforts working towards honoring Mable's contributions to the community. A petition on Change.org aims to rename the Ashby BART Station to the Mable Howard Station. Additionally, the Lorin Business Association aims to "establish a public plaza to honor Mable Howard which will create a center of community connection." Furthermore, the Berkeley Historical Plaque Project is currently fundraising for a plaque honoring Mama Howard.
