= Michael Lomax =

American businessman (born 1947)

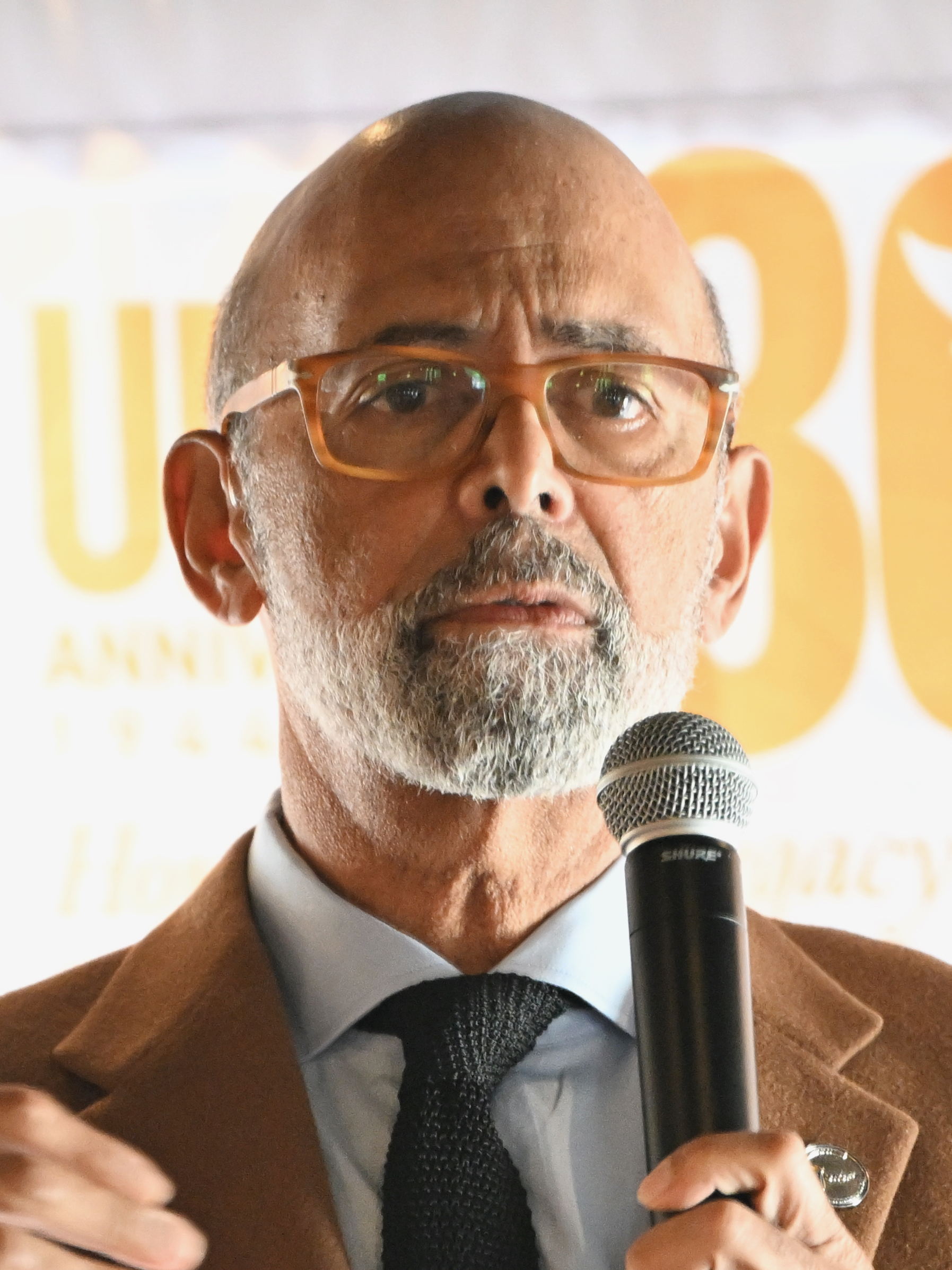
Lomax in October 2024

Michael Lucius Lomax (born October 2, 1947) is an American educator and former elected official who has served as president and chief executive officer of the United Negro College Fund since 2004. From 1997 to 2004, he served as president of Dillard University, a historically Black university (HBCU). Lomax was elected as a member and then chairman of the Fulton County Board of Commissioners, the first African American elected official in history to lead a major county government in the State of Georgia.

== Early life and education ==
Michael Lomax was born October 2, 1947, in Los Angeles, California, to Lucius W. Lomax, Jr. (1910-1973), an attorney, and Hallie Almena Davis Lomax (1915-2011), a journalist. His sister, Melanie E. Lomax, the Los Angeles civil rights lawyer, died in 2006.

Lomax attended Morehouse College at the age of sixteen years old, graduating magna cum laude in 1968 with a bachelor’s degree in English and minors in Spanish and history. He and three classmates were the first students inducted into Phi Beta Kappa at Morehouse.

He went on to earn a master's degree in English literature at Columbia University in 1972, and a doctor of philosophy in American and African American studies from Emory University in 1984, where his doctoral dissertation topic was Countee Cullen, a Harlem Renaissance poet who was briefly married to the daughter of W.E.B. Du Bois.

== Academic career ==
In 1969, Lomax joined Morehouse College as an English literature instructor. He served on the faculties of Morehouse College and Spelman College for 20 years.

From 1997 to 2004, Lomax served as president and professor of English and African world studies at Dillard University in New Orleans, Louisiana. During his tenure at Dillard, student enrollment at the private HBCU increased by 49 percent, private funding by 300 percent and alumni giving more than 2,000 percent. In addition, President Lomax led an aggressive $60 million campus renovation program to improve the living and learning environment for Dillard students.

== Public Service ==
Lomax began his career as an Atlanta public servant in the 1970s. He held several positions, including director of research and special assistant to Atlanta Mayor Maynard Jackson, the city's first African American mayor, and established Atlanta's Office of Cultural Affairs.

In 1978, Dr. Lomax ran for public office and was elected to the Fulton County Board of Commissioners. Two years later, he was elected chairman of the board, becoming the first African American to lead a major county government in Georgia. He served as board chairman for 12 years, overseeing a $500 million annual operating budget and 5,000 county employees. As a commissioner, he helped bring the 1988 Democratic National Convention and the 1996 Olympic Games to Atlanta. He also spearheaded a number of major construction projects, including building Georgia's Interstate 400, expanding and renovating historic Grady Hospital and constructing the new Fulton County government center. He also founded the Fulton County Arts Council, the National Black Arts Festival, and served as commissioner of Parks, Recreation and Cultural Affairs in Atlanta.

In 1989 and 1993, he was an unsuccessful candidate for mayor of Atlanta.

== United Negro College Fund ==
Since 2004, Lomax has served as president and chief executive officer of the United Negro College Fund (UNCF), the largest private provider of scholarships and other educational support to underrepresented students. He launched UNCF's Institute for Capacity Building, which supports member HBCUs to become stronger, more effective and self-sustaining. Under his leadership, UNCF has raised over $5 billion, helping more than 200,000 students earn college degrees and launch careers. In 2023, UNCF was named one of America’s Top 100 Charities.

Annually, UNCF's work enables 50,000 students to go to college with UNCF scholarships and attend its 37-member HBCUs. Lomax oversees the organization's 400-plus scholarship programs, which award more than 10,000 scholarships a year; the six-year undergraduate graduation rate for UNCF scholarship recipients is greater than the U.S. college students total.

In addition, Lomax has negotiated public and private partnerships to advance HBCUs goals. In 2023, UNCF received a $190 million gift from Fidelity Investments, and in 2024, UNCF received a $100 million unrestricted grant from the Lilly Endowment to support the organization's $1 billion capital campaign. The gift is the largest donation in UNCF's history and expands the pooled endowment for its 37 member HBCU institutions.

Lomax was the keynote speaker for the 154th Commencement Convocation at Benedict College, a UNCF member institution.

== Boards and Associations ==
He serves on the boards of Handshake, the KIPP Foundation, Cengage Group and Teach for America. He is a member of the Phi Beta Kappa Senate, a member of Alpha Phi Alpha and Sigma Pi Phi fraternities, a trustee of the Studio Museum in Harlem and a founding member of the Smithsonian Institution's National Museum of African American History and Culture, which he was appointed to by U.S. Speaker of the House J. Dennis Hastert. U.S. President George W. Bush appointed Lomax to the President's Board of Advisors on Historically Black Colleges and Universities.

He is a past board member of America's Promise Alliance, The Carter Center and Emory University.

== Awards ==
In 2018, Dr. Lomax received the Dr. Eugene D. Stevenson, Jr. Lifetime Achievement Award from the Higher Education Leadership Foundation (H.E.L.F.), the highest honor bestowed by the foundation. Lomax received Emory University's most prestigious alumni honor, the Emory Medal, in 2004. He also received the Omicron Delta Kappa Laurel Crowned Circle Award, the organization's highest honor, Morehouse's Bennie Achievement Award and 17 honorary degrees.

== Personal life ==
Lomax has three daughters, Michele, Rachel and Deignan and 5 grandchildren.

He is a member of Alpha Phi Alpha and Sigma Pi Phi fraternities. Lomax was also inducted into Omicron Delta Kappa in 2000 at Dillard.
