= 1989 Atlanta mayoral election =

- October 3, 1989
- Turnout: 36.53%

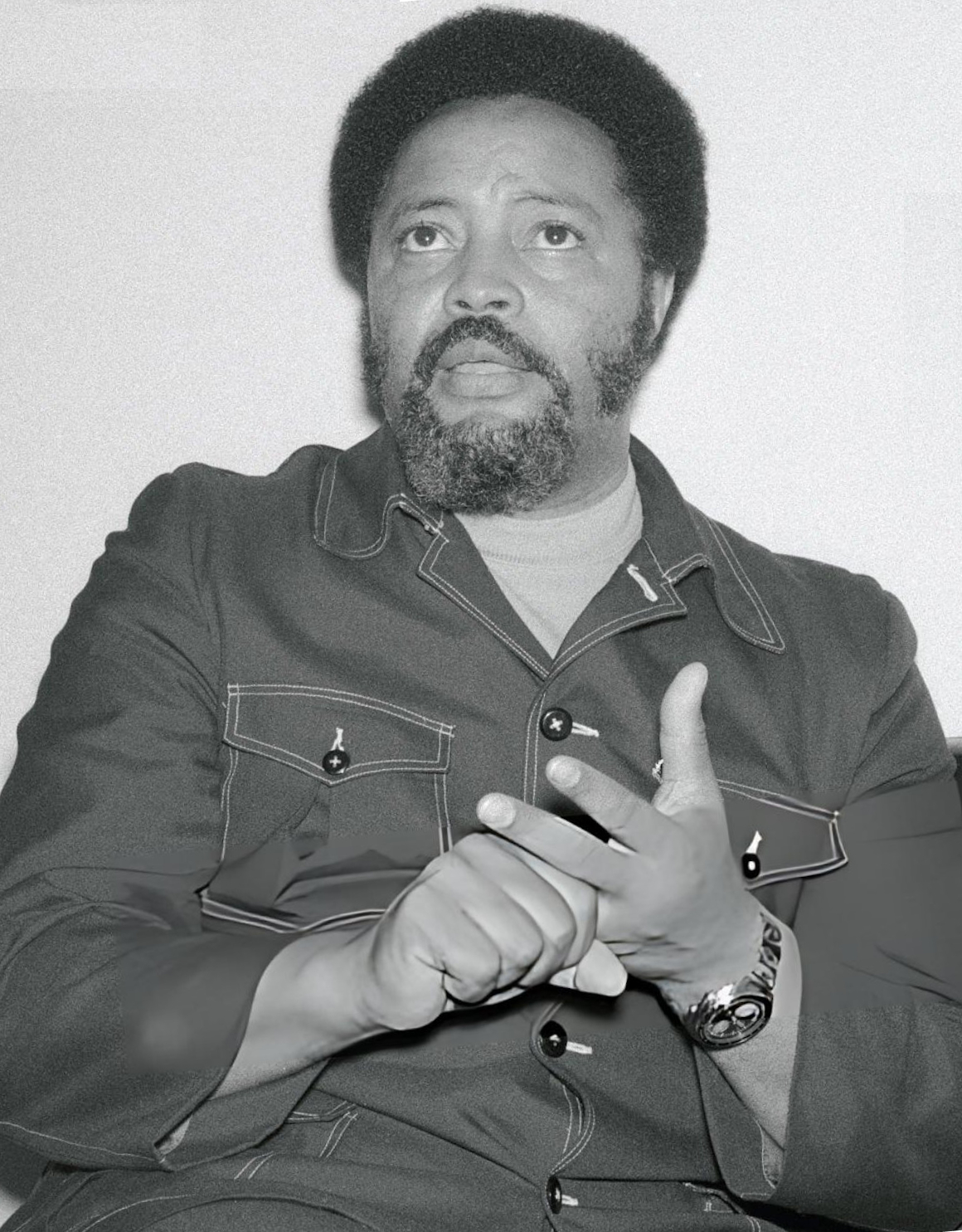
Candidate	Maynard Jackson	Hosea Williams
Party	Nonpartisan	Nonpartisan
Popular vote	55,811	11,261
Percentage	79.37%	16.01%
Mayor before election
Andrew Young
Democratic
Elected mayor
Maynard Jackson
Democratic

The 1989 Atlanta mayoral election occurred on October 3, 1989. Former mayor Maynard Jackson won a third non-consecutive term in a landslide victory.

Incumbent mayor Andrew Young was barred from seeking reelection due to term limits.

Since Jackson received a majority in the general election, no runoff election needed to be held.

== Candidates ==
- Jerry Farber, comedian
- Maynard Jackson, former mayor (1974–1982)
- Lafayette Perry
- Mark Teal
- Hosea Williams, Atlanta city councilor
- Mitchell Williams

Withdrew

- Michael Lomax, chairman of the Fulton County Commission

== Campaign ==
In early August, Jackson's prime competitor, Michael Lomax, withdrew from the race. Later that month, right before the qualifying deadline to enter the race, Hosea Williams entered the race, claiming that he wanted to prevent the election from becoming, "a coronation of Maynard".

The race drew little interest, and saw what was considered to be low turnout.

== Results ==
Atlanta mayoral general election, 1989
Party	Candidate	Votes	%
Nonpartisan	Maynard Jackson	55,811	79.37
Nonpartisan	Hosea Williams	11,261	16.01
Nonpartisan	Jerry Farber	2,101	2.99
Nonpartisan	Mark Teal	732	1.04
Nonpartisan	Mitchell Williams	273	0.39
Nonpartisan	Lafayette Parry	141	0.20
Turnout		70,319	36.53
