= Lorin District, Berkeley, California =

Neighborhood

Lorin
- Neighborhood of Berkeley
- Location of Lorin in Berkeley
- Coordinates: 37.850978°N 122.274232°W
- Country: United States
- State: California
- County: Alameda
- City: Berkeley

The Lorin District (also known as the Lorin Streetcar District) is a neighborhood located in the southern part of Berkeley, California, bounded by Ashby Avenue to the north, Adeline Street and Martin Luther King Jr. Way to the east, Sacramento Street to the west, and 62nd Street to the south. Today, the area is today mostly referred to as "South Berkeley".

== History ==
The land was first populated by the Ohlone Native Americans, who were displaced by Spanish settlers in the 1700s. It was unincorporated as the town or settlement of Lorin, and was a stop along the Berkeley Branch line of the Central Pacific (later, Southern Pacific) — a train station was located at Adeline and Alcatraz. In 1892, the people of Lorin elected to be annexed to the City of Berkeley.

While Lorin supported a large Japanese immigrant population in the early 20th century, many such residents were forcibly removed to internment camps during WWII. After their displacement, many Black migrants from the American South settled in the district.

In the 1930s, the Lorin District was redlined by the federal Home Owners’ Loan Corporation, leading to decades of underdevelopment and government disinvestment.

== In popular culture ==
Lorin is the setting for a scene in former University of California student Frank Norris' book The Octopus (1903).

== See also ==
- South Berkeley
- Internment of Japanese Americans
- Second Great Migration
- Redlining
