= UNCF =

American philanthropic organization

United Negro College Fund
- Abbreviation: UNCF
- Founded: April 25, 1944; 82 years ago
- Founder: Frederick D. Patterson; Mary McLeod Bethune
- Type: Educational
- Tax ID no.: 13-1624241
- Legal status: 501(c)(3)
- Headquarters: 1805 7th Street NW; Washington, D.C. 20001
- Coordinates: 38.9143°N 77.0214°W
- Region served: United States
- President, Chief Executive Officer: Michael Lomax
- Revenue: $350 million (2023)
- Expenses: $171 million (2023)
- Endowment: $154 million (2023)
- Employees: 281 (2017)
- Volunteers: 2,584 (2017)
- Website: uncf.org

The United Negro College Fund (UNCF) is an American philanthropic organization that funds scholarships for Black students and general scholarship funds for 37 private historically black colleges and universities. UNCF was incorporated on April 25, 1944, by Frederick D. Patterson (then president of what became Tuskegee University), Mary McLeod Bethune, and others. UNCF is headquartered at 1805 7th Street, NW in Washington, D.C. In 2005, UNCF supported approximately 65,000 students at over 900 colleges and universities with approximately $113 million in grants and scholarships. About 60% of these students are the first in their families to attend college, and 62% have annual family incomes of less than $25,000. UNCF also administers over 450 named scholarships.

UNCF's president and chief executive officer is Michael Lomax. Past presidents of the UNCF included William H. Gray and Vernon Jordan.

== Scholarships ==
Though founded to address funding inequities in education resources for African Americans, UNCF-administered scholarships are open to all ethnicities; the great majority of recipients are still African-American. It provides scholarships to students attending its member colleges as well as to those going elsewhere.

Graduates of UNCF member institutions and scholarships have included many Black people in the fields of business, politics, health care and the arts. Some prominent UNCF alumni include: Dr. Martin Luther King Jr., a Nobel Peace Prize laureate and leader in the civil rights movement; Alexis Herman, former U.S. Secretary of Labor; movie director Spike Lee; actor Samuel L. Jackson; General Chappie James, the U.S. Air Force’s first black four-star general; and Dr. David Satcher, a former U.S. Surgeon General and director of the Centers for Disease Control.

== History ==
In 1944 William J. Trent, a long-time activist for education for black people, joined with Tuskegee Institute President Frederick D. Patterson and Mary McLeod Bethune to found the UNCF, a nonprofit that united college presidents to raise money collectively through an "appeal to the national conscience". As the first executive director from the organization's start in 1944 until 1964, Trent raised $78 million for historically Black colleges so they could become "strong citadels of learning, carriers of the American dream, seedbeds of social evolution and revolution". In 2008, reflecting shifting attitudes toward the word Negro in its name, the UNCF shifted from using its full name to using only its initials, releasing a new logo with the initials alone and featuring their slogan more prominently.

In 2025, billionaire philanthropist MacKenzie Scott donated $70 million to the United Negro College Fund (UNCF) to support historically Black colleges and universities (HBCUs). The donation is intended to promote financial stability, capacity building, and long-term sustainability for HBCUs. UNCF announced that the funds would be distributed to address both immediate institutional needs and broader inequities in higher-education funding for historically Black institutions.

== Fundraising and the Lou Rawls Parade of Stars ==
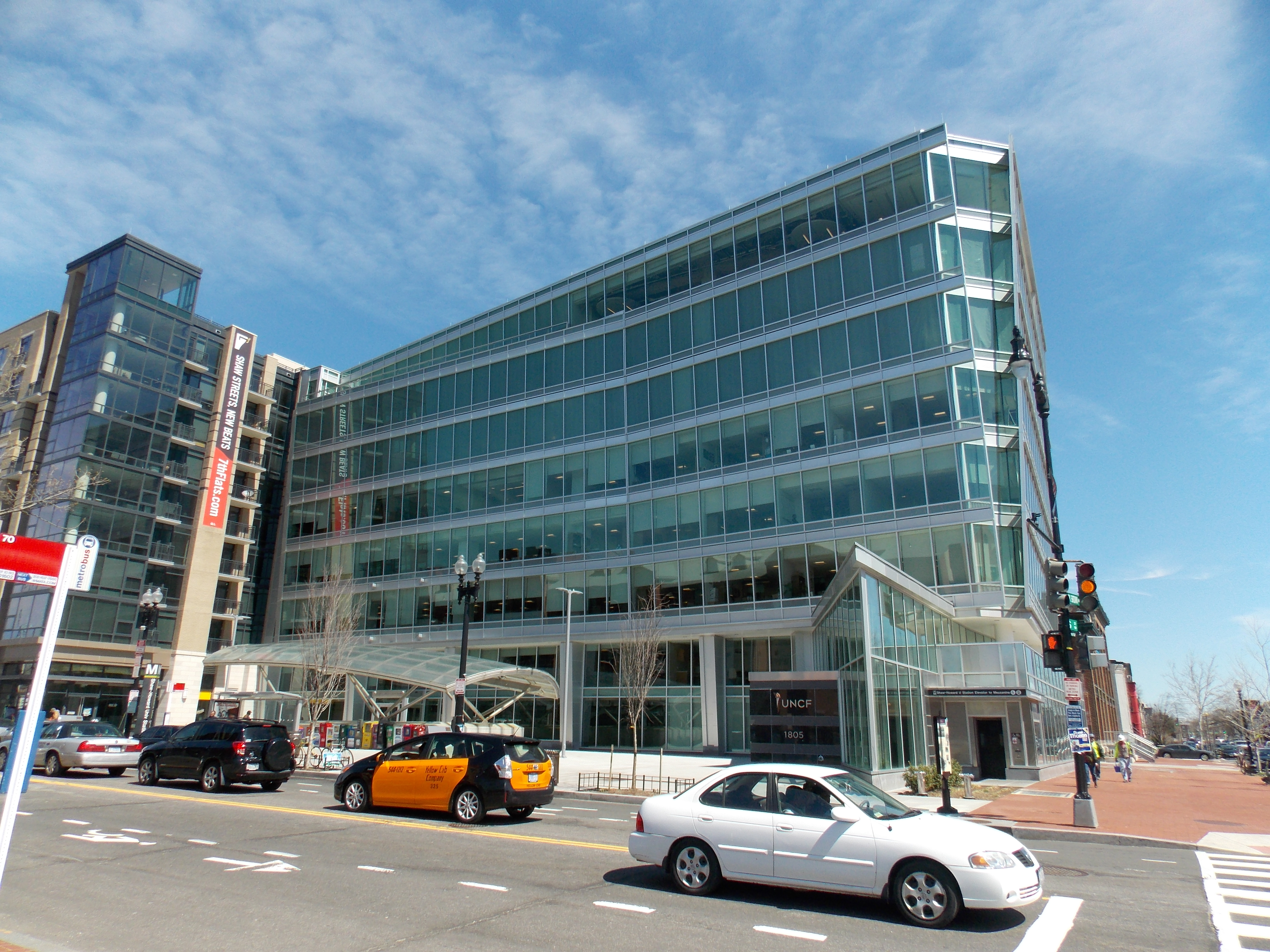
United Negro College Fund headquarters in Washington, D.C.

The UNCF has received charitable donations for its scholarship programs. One of the more high-profile donations made was by then-senator and future U.S. President John F. Kennedy who donated the money from the Pulitzer Prize for his book Profiles in Courage to the Fund. Another significant donation was made in 1990 by Walter Annenberg, who donated $50 million to the fund.

Beginning in 1980, singer Lou Rawls began the "Lou Rawls Parade of Stars" telethon to benefit the UNCF. The annual event, now known as "An Evening of Stars", consists of stories of successful African-American students who have graduated or benefited from one of the many historically black colleges and universities and who received support from the UNCF. The telethon featured comedy and musical performances from various artists in support of the UNCF's and Rawls' efforts. The event has raised over $200 million in 27 shows for the fund through 2006.

In January 2004, Rawls was honored by the United Negro College Fund for his more than 25 years of charity work with the organization. Instead of Rawls' hosting and performing, he was given the seat of honor and celebrated by his performing colleagues, including Stevie Wonder, The O'Jays, Gerald Levert, Ashanti, and several others. Before his death in January 2006, Rawls' last performance was a taping for the 2006 telethon that honored Wonder, months before entering the hospital after being diagnosed with cancer earlier in the year.

In addition to the telethon, there are a number of other fundraising activities, including the "Walk for Education" held annually in Los Angeles, California, which includes a five kilometer walk/run. In Houston, Texas, the Cypresswood Golf Club hosts an annual golf tournament in April.

In 2014, Koch Industries Inc. and the Charles Koch Foundation made a $25 million grant to UNCF. In protest of the Kochs, the American Federation of State, County and Municipal Employees, a major labor union, ended its yearly $50,000–60,000 support for UNCF.

In 2015, the Lilly Endowment donated $50 million to UNCF to establish the Career Pathways Initiative (CPI) for HBCUs.

In June 2020, Netflix founder Reed Hastings donated $120 million to the UNCF to be used as scholarship funds for students enrolled at UNCF institutions. His donation was the largest in UNCF history.

In 2024, the Lilly Endowment added to its 2015 gift and awarded a $100 million unrestricted grant to UNCF's $1 billion capital campaign.

== The UNCF motto ==
In 1972, the UNCF adopted as its motto the maxim "A mind is a terrible thing to waste." This maxim has become one of the most widely recognized slogans in advertising history. The motto was notably mangled in a 1989 address to the organization by then–Vice President of the United States Dan Quayle, who stated: "And you take the U.N.C.F. model that what a waste it is to lose one's mind or not to have a mind is being very wasteful. How true that is." The motto, which has been used in numerous award-winning UNCF ad campaigns, was created by Forest Long, of the advertising agency Young & Rubicam, in partnership with the Ad Council.

A lesser-known slogan the UNCF also uses, in reference to its intended beneficiaries, points out that they're "not asking for a handout, just a hand."

== UNCF member institutions ==
=== Alabama ===
- Miles College, Birmingham, Miles College
- Oakwood University, Huntsville, Oakwood University
- Stillman College, Tuscaloosa, Stillman College
- Talladega College, Talladega, Talladega College
- Tuskegee University, Tuskegee, Tuskegee University

=== Arkansas ===
- Philander Smith College, Little Rock, Philander Smith University

=== Florida ===
- Bethune-Cookman University, Daytona Beach, Bethune-Cookman University
- Edward Waters College, Jacksonville, Edward Waters University
- Florida Memorial University, Miami Gardens, Florida Memorial University

=== Georgia ===
- Clark Atlanta University, Atlanta, Clark Atlanta University
- Interdenominational Theological Center, Atlanta, Interdenominational Theological Center
- Morehouse College, Atlanta, Morehouse College
- Paine College, Augusta, Paine College
- Spelman College, Atlanta, Spelman College

=== Louisiana ===
- Dillard University, New Orleans, Dillard University
- Xavier University of Louisiana, New Orleans, Xavier University of Louisiana

=== Mississippi ===
- Rust College, Holly Springs, Rust College
- Tougaloo College, Tougaloo, Tougaloo College

=== North Carolina ===
- Bennett College, Greensboro, Bennett College
- Johnson C. Smith University, Charlotte, Johnson C. Smith University
- Livingstone College, Salisbury, Livingstone College
- Saint Augustine's University, Raleigh, Saint Augustine’s University
- Shaw University, Raleigh, Shaw University

=== Ohio ===
- Wilberforce University, Wilberforce, Wilberforce University

=== South Carolina ===
- Allen University, Columbia, Allen University
- Benedict College, Columbia, Benedict College
- Claflin University, Orangeburg, Claflin University
- Morris College, Sumter, Morris College
- Voorhees College, Denmark, Voorhees University

=== Tennessee ===
- Fisk University, Nashville, Fisk University
- Lane College, Jackson, Lane College
- LeMoyne-Owen College, Memphis, LeMoyne-Owen College

=== Texas ===
- Huston–Tillotson University, Austin, Huston-Tillotson University
- Jarvis Christian College, Hawkins, Jarvis Christian University
- Texas College, Tyler, Texas College
- Wiley College, Marshall, Wiley University

=== Virginia ===
- Virginia Union University, Richmond, Virginia Union University

== Member HBCUs (tabular) ==
The member HCBUs include (tabular):

| Name | City | State | Established | Endowment | Students | Religious affiliation | Sporting affiliations |
|---|---|---|---|---|---|---|---|
| Allen University | Columbia | South Carolina | 1870 | $0.31 million | 817 | African Methodist Episcopal Church | NCAA Division II, SIAC |
| Benedict College | Columbia | South Carolina | 1870 | $21.6 million | 2,040 | American Baptist Churches USA | NCAA Division II, SIAC |
| Bennett College | Greensboro | North Carolina | 1873 | $13.7 million | 311 | United Methodist Church | unaffiliated |
| Bethune–Cookman University | Daytona Beach | Florida | 1904 | $28.9 million | 2,901 | United Methodist Church | NCAA Division I FCS, SWAC |
| Claflin University | Orangeburg | South Carolina | 1869 | $28.6 million | 2,070 | United Methodist Church | NCAA Division II, CIAA |
| Clark Atlanta University | Atlanta | Georgia | 1865 | $72.5 million | 3,920 | United Methodist Church | NCAA Division II, SIAC |
| Dillard University | New Orleans | Louisiana | 1869 | $94.2 million | 1,225 | United Church of Christ, United Methodist Church | NAIA, HBCUAC |
| Edward Waters College | Jacksonville | Florida | 1866 | $1.68 million | 3,085 | African Methodist Episcopal Church | NCAA Division II, SIAC |
| Fisk University | Nashville | Tennessee | 1866 | $25.5 million | 874 | United Church of Christ | NAIA, HBCUAC |
| Florida Memorial University | Miami Gardens | Florida | 1879 | $4.0 million | 1,097 | American Baptist Churches USA | NAIA, TSC |
| Huston–Tillotson University | Austin | Texas | 1875 | $10.9 million | 1,121 | United Methodist Church, United Church of Christ | NAIA, RRAC |
| Interdenominational Theological Center | Atlanta | Georgia | 1958 | $7.68 million | 265 | n/a | n/a |
| Jarvis Christian College | Hawkins | Texas | 1912 | $10.7 million | 867 | Christian Church (Disciples of Christ) | NAIA, RRAC |
| Johnson C. Smith University | Charlotte | North Carolina | 1867 | $69.0 million | 1,494 | Presbyterian Church (USA) | NCAA Division II, CIAA |
| Lane College | Jackson | Tennessee | 1882 | $4.9 million | 1,267 | Christian Methodist Episcopal Church | NCAA Division II, SIAC |
| LeMoyne–Owen College | Memphis | Tennessee | 1968 | $52 million | 835 | United Church of Christ | NCAA Division II, SIAC |
| Livingstone College | Salisbury | North Carolina | 1879 | $4.97 million | 1,122 | African Methodist Episcopal Zion Church | NCAA Division II, CIAA |
| Miles College | Birmingham | Alabama | 1898 | $23.3 million | 1,456 | CME Church | NCAA Division II, SIAC |
| Morehouse College | Atlanta | Georgia | 1867 | $156.0 million | 2,238 | n/a | NCAA Division II, SIAC |
| Morris College | Sumter | South Carolina | 1908 | $10.3 million | 600 | Baptist Educational and Missionary Convention of South Carolina | NAIA – Independent |
| Oakwood University | Huntsville | Alabama | 1896 | $19.7 million | 1,526 | Seventh-day Adventist Church | USCAA Division I |
| Paine College | Augusta | Georgia | 1882 | $12.1 million | 448 | United Methodist Church, Christian Methodist Episcopal Church | NCCAA |
| Philander Smith College | Little Rock | Arkansas | 1877 | $9.28 million | 996 | United Methodist Church | NAIA, HBCUAC |
| Rust College | Holly Springs | Mississippi | 1866 | $37.0 million | 738 | United Methodist Church | NAIA, HBCUAC |
| Saint Augustine's University | Raleigh | North Carolina | 1867 | $20.6 million | 899 | Episcopal Church | NCAA Division II, CIAA |
| Shaw University | Raleigh | North Carolina | 1865 | $10.9 million | 1,291 | National Baptist Convention, USA, Inc., American Baptist Churches, USA | NCAA Division II, CIAA |
| Spelman College | Atlanta | Georgia | 1881 | $390.0 million | 2,120 | n/a | n/a |
| Stillman College | Tuscaloosa | Alabama | 1876 | $19.1 million | 861 | Presbyterian Church (USA) | NAIA, HBCUAC |
| Talladega College | Talladega | Alabama | 1867 | $2.59 million | 1,239 | United Church of Christ | NAIA, HBCUAC |
| Texas College | Tyler | Texas | 1894 | $5.43 million | 940 | Christian Methodist Episcopal Church | NAIA – RRAC, SAC |
| Tougaloo College | Tougaloo | Mississippi | 1869 | $17.6 million | 716 | United Church of Christ, Christian Church (Disciples of Christ) | NAIA, HBCUAC |
| Tuskegee University | Tuskegee | Alabama | 1881 | $129.0 million | 2,876 | n/a | NCAA Division II, SIAC |
| Virginia Union University | Richmond | Virginia | 1865 | $33.4 million | 1,451 | American Baptist Churches USA | NCAA Division II, CIAA |
| Voorhees College | Denmark | South Carolina | 1897 | $8.06 million | 510 | Episcopal Church | NAIA – HBCUAC |
| Wilberforce University | Wilberforce | Ohio | 1856 | $6.71 million | 566 | African Methodist Episcopal Church | NAIA – HBCUAC |
| Wiley College | Marshall | Texas | 1879 | $6.17 million | 712 | United Methodist Church | NAIA, HBCUAC |
| Xavier University of Louisiana | New Orleans | Louisiana | 1925 | $171.0 million | 3,325 | Catholic (Sisters of the Blessed Sacrament) | NAIA, RRAC |
