= Ashby station (BART) =

Metro station in Berkeley, California, US

Ashby
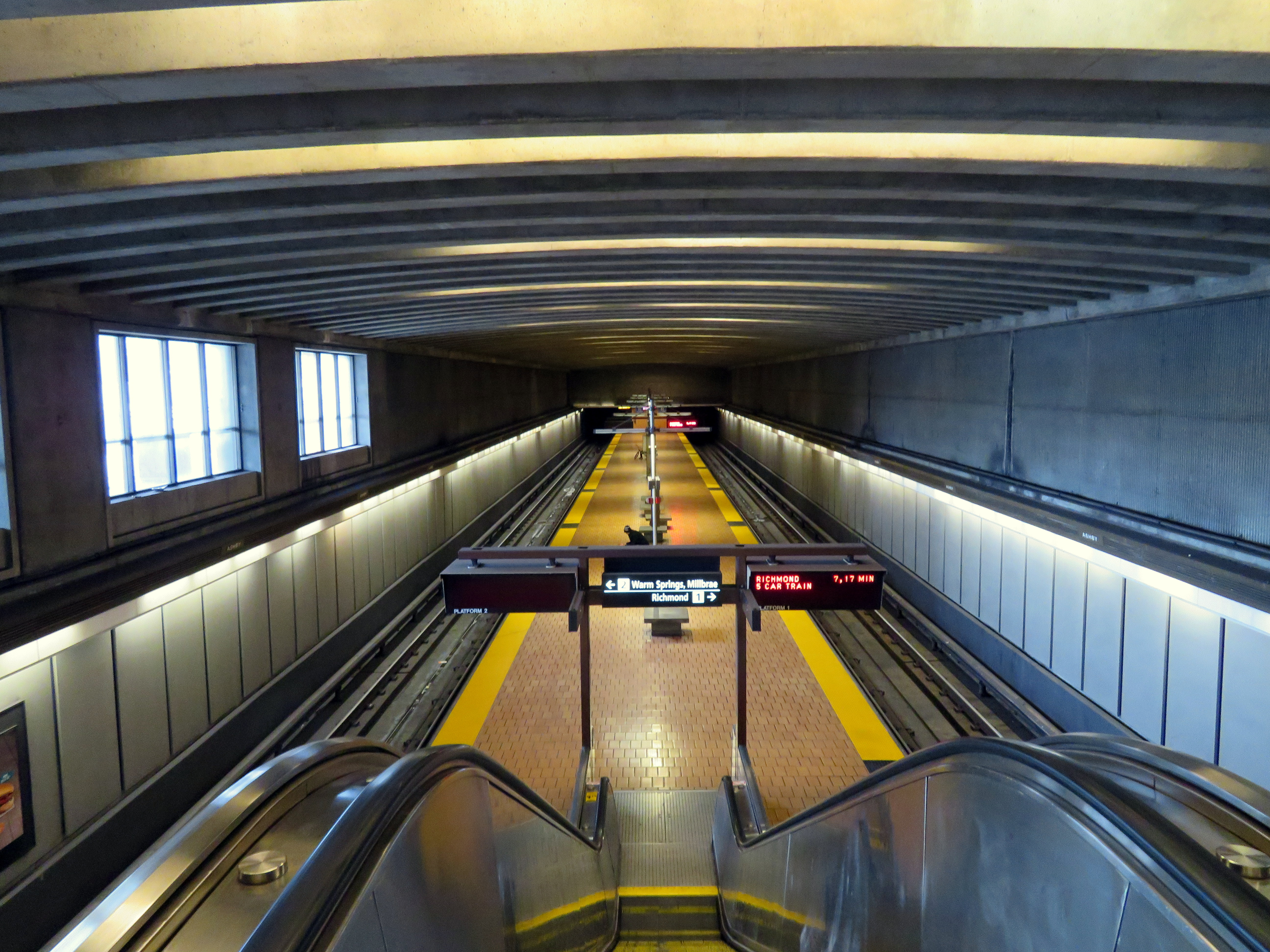
- Ashby station platform viewed from the mezzanine level

General information
- Location: 3100 Adeline Street; Berkeley, California
- Coordinates: 37.853068°N 122.269957°W
- Owner: San Francisco Bay Area Rapid Transit District, City of Berkeley
- Line: BART R-Line
- Platforms: 1 island platform
- Tracks: 2
- Connections: AC Transit: F, 7, 12, 27, 18, 800; West Berkeley Shuttle

Construction
- Structure type: Underground
- Parking: 535 spaces
- Cycle facilities: racks, station, 24 shared lockers, 24 keyed reserved lockers
- Accessible: Yes
- Architect: Maher & Martens

Other information
- Station code: BART: ASHB

History
- Opened: January 29, 1973

Passengers
- 2025: 2,280 (weekday average)

Services
| Preceding station | Bay Area Rapid Transit | Following station |
|---|---|---|
| MacArthur toward Berryessa | Orange Line | Downtown Berkeley toward Richmond |
| MacArthur toward Millbrae | Red Line | Downtown Berkeley toward Richmond |
Location

Ashby station is an underground Bay Area Rapid Transit (BART) station in Berkeley, California. The station is located beneath Adeline Street to the south of its intersection with Ashby Avenue. The station includes park-and-ride facilities with 535 automobile parking spaces in two separate parking lots. It is served by the Orange and Red lines.

== Station layout ==
The station has a single island platform located below ground. The fare mezzanine is located at the same level as the west parking lot; stairs and an elevator provide access from Adeline Street overhead. The station is served several AC Transit routes that stop in different locations around its perimeter:

- Local: 7, 12, 27, 18
- Transbay: F
- All Nighter: 800

The free West Berkeley Shuttle runs from the station to the West Berkeley area.

== History ==
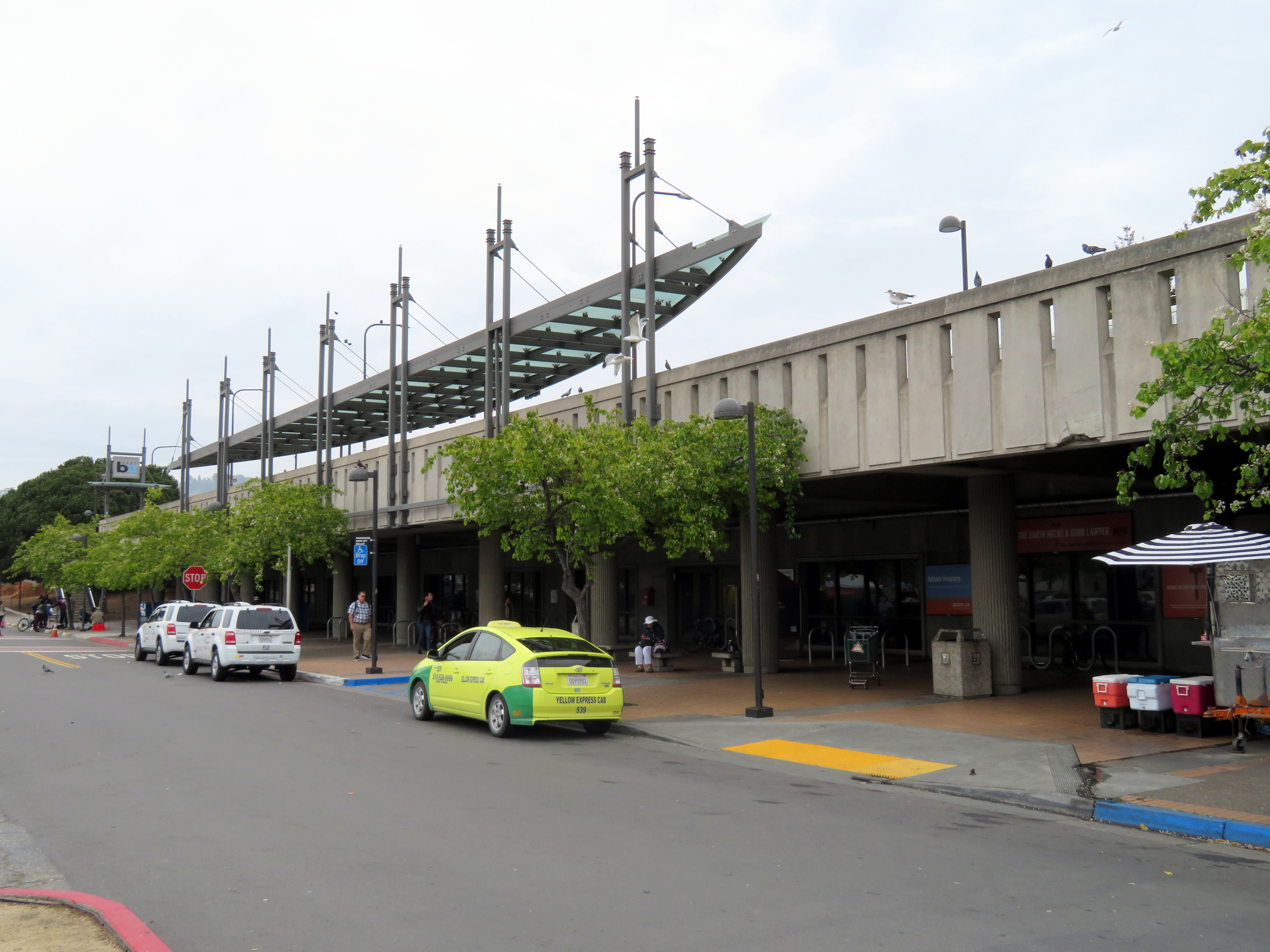
Main entrance from the west parking lot

The station site is approximately at the historic location of Berkeley Branch Railroad's Newbury station, which opened after 1876. The BART Board approved the name "Ashby Place" in December 1965. The three stations in Berkeley were originally planned to be elevated, but the City of Berkeley paid extra tax to have them built underground. However, Ashby BART was exempt due to a stipulation that allowed the line to continue above ground. The activist Mable Howard led the effort to move the BART line underground; it would have divided the predominantly Black neighborhood of South Berkeley. The station design was controversial because it was not fully underground; the west side of the mezzanine is level with the parking lot. Eminent domain was used to take land for the parking lots, which contributed to the decline of the Black community in the area. Service at Ashby station began on January 29, 1973, as part of the MacArthur to Richmond extension.

Uniquely in the BART system, the City of Berkeley, rather than BART, controls the air rights on the parking lots. Between 2008 and 2010, a portion of the east parking lot was redeveloped as the Ed Roberts Campus, which houses several regional disability-related organizations. The east parking lot and station entrance were closed for construction on August 18, 2008. The east parking lot reopened on April 19, 2010, and the Ed Roberts Campus and the new east entrance opened that November.

The west parking lot of the station hosts a popular flea market on weekends; a proposed residential transit-oriented development over the lot proved locally controversial. The Berkeley City Council approved a memorandum of understanding with BART in December 2019 to begin planning for housing on the lot. The council approved plans for housing at Ashby and North Berkeley in June 2022. By July 2023, the Ashby development was stalled due to disagreements between BART and the city over a planned expansion of a BART electrical substation, which occupies part of the property. BART presented modified plans to accommodate the substation in November 2023, with developer solicitation then planned for mid-2024.
