= Berkeley Historical Plaque Project =

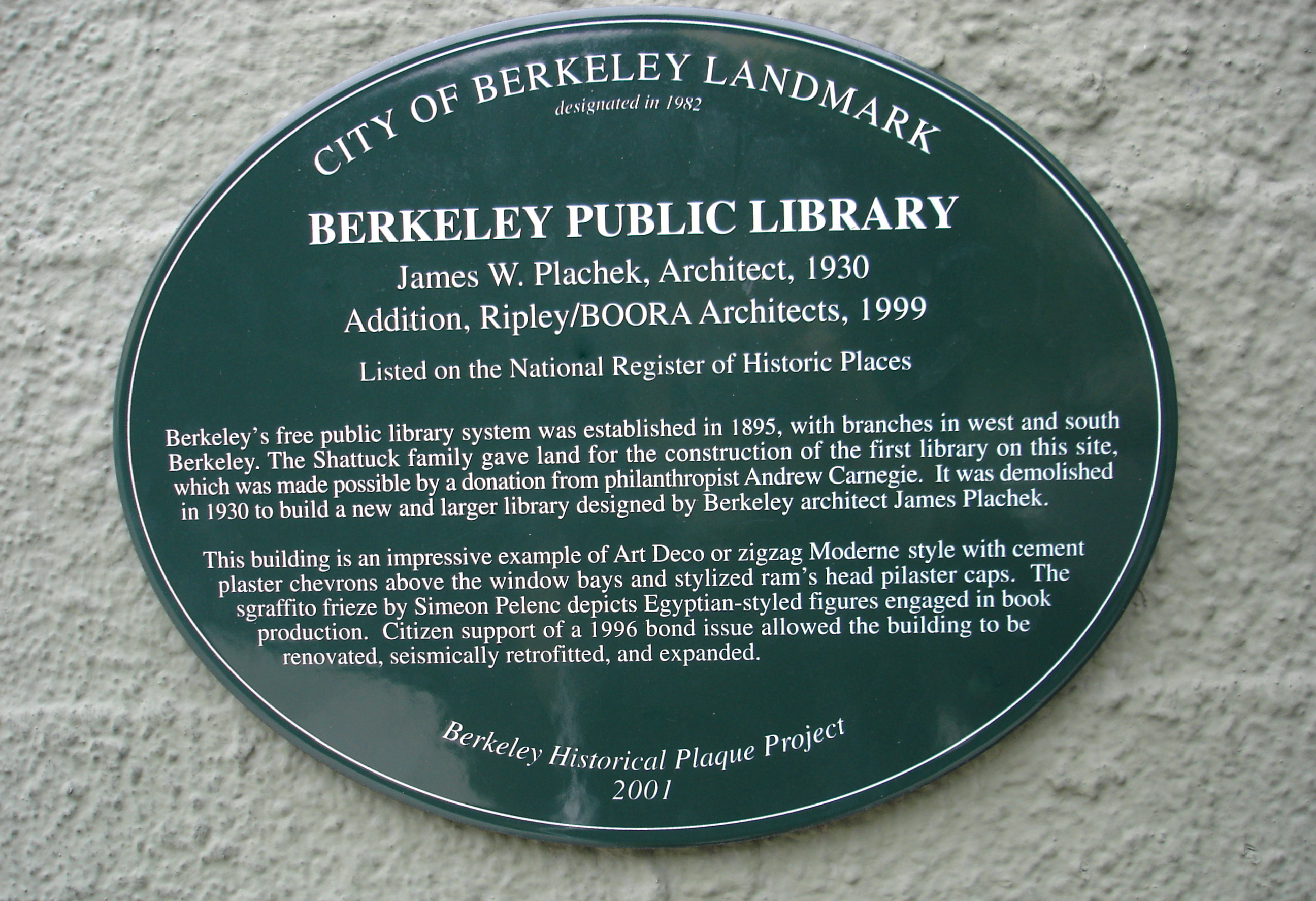
Berkeley Landmark Plaque: Main Branch Library, Downtown Berkeley

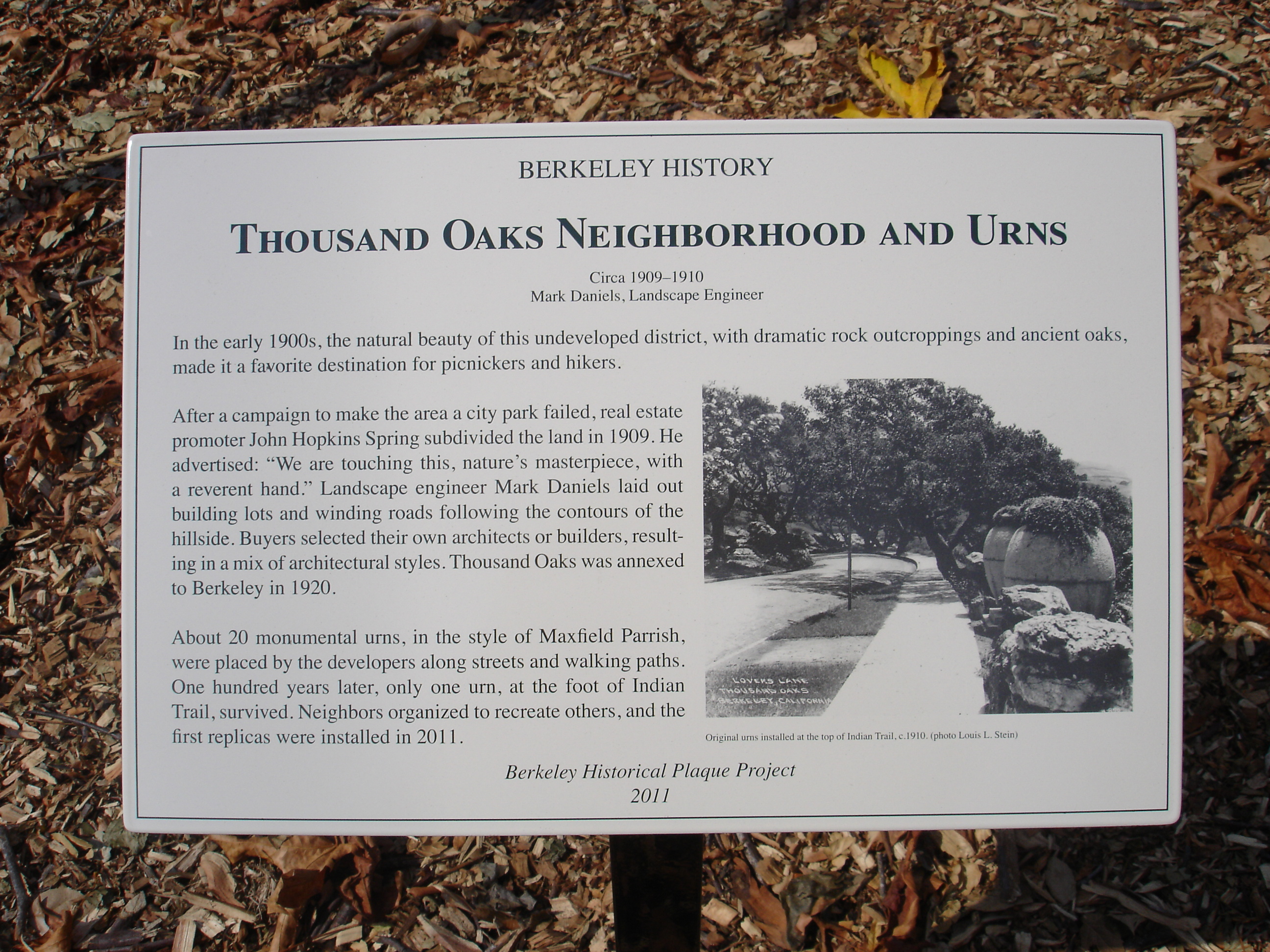
Thousand Oaks Neighborhood and Urns Plaque (2011)

The Berkeley Historical Plaque Project, founded in 1997, is a Berkeley, California non-profit 501 (c)(3) organization whose mission is to document Berkeley’s history through plaques identifying locations of historical import. Sponsors include the City of Berkeley, Berkeley's Landmarks Preservation Commission, the Berkeley Architectural Heritage Association (BAHA) and the Berkeley Historical Society (BHS).

Project members work with building owners to develop and install distinctive oval green enamel plaques identifying the names, dates and significance of historic buildings. Rectangular plaques with a cream-white background color identify sites of historic interest and often include an historic photo image of the site.

In 2002 the Project was given a “President’s Award” by the California Preservation Foundation "in recognition of outstanding achievement in the field of Historic Preservation." That same year the Mayor and Berkeley's City Council commended Project members for "their tireless efforts to make Berkeley's history a vital part of our present community."

== e-Plaques ==
In 2012 the Plaque Project launched a website documenting its work. Plaques are categorized by geographic areas and linked to interactive maps. Texts are accompanied by historic photos and links to external articles, lectures, and videos. The website expands the Project's reach into the realm of "e-Plaques" that virtually document historic buildings, homes of notable Berkeley residents, and even unique natural phenomena. Crowd-sourcing is used to expand the texts and photos. With viewer contributions, over time this section will evolve into a collaborative portrait of Berkeley.
