= Black Elvis =

Black Elvis may refer to:

== Alias or nicknames for people ==
=== Elvis Presley impersonators ===
- Blelvis, American singer and street entertainer
- Clearance Giddens, American Elvis impersonator
- Robert Washington (impersonator) (born 1958), American Elvis impersonator

=== Others ===
- Kool Keith (born 1963), American rapper
- Roger Knox (born 1948), Aboriginal Australian country singer
- Jimi Hendrix (1942–1970), American guitarist and musician, in the UK press
- Witiyana Marika, Aboriginal Australian musician and elder, member of Yothu Yindi
- Teddy Pendergrass (1950–2010), American singer-songwriter
- Jackie Wilson (1934–1984), American soul and R&B singer
- Blac Elvis, American producer

== Other uses ==
- Black Elvis, a band of which American musician Scott Shriner was a member before Weezer
- "Elvis", a single released by English punk band Goldblade in 1996
- "Black Elvis", a short story by American writer Geoffrey Becker

== See also ==
- Black Elvis/Lost in Space, a 1999 album by Kool Keith
- Black Elvis 2, a 2023 album by Kool Keith
