= Patty Carroll =

American photographer (born 1946)

- Born: December 30, 1946 (age 79); Chicago, Illinois, U.S.
- Education: University of Illinois Urbana-Champaign; Institute of Design at the Illinois Institute of Technology
- Known for: Art photography
- Notable work: Anonymous Women
- Website: www.pattycarroll.com

Patricia Carroll (born December 30, 1946) is an American art photographer whose work explores issues of gender and identity. She is best known for her Anonymous Women series.

== Early life, education, and personal life ==
Carroll was born in Chicago, Illinois, on December 30, 1946, as the eldest of two children of John W. Carroll, a state politician and local newspaper proprietor, and Carol Carroll, a journalist and editor who worked in the family's newspaper business. She grew up in the Chicago suburb of Park Ridge and attended Regina Dominican High School. After high school, she studied graphics design at the University of Illinois Urbana-Champaign, graduating in 1968 with a Bachelor of Fine Arts, before obtaining a Master of Science in photography from the Institute of Design at the Illinois Institute of Technology in 1972, having been taught by Art Sinsabaugh, Garry Winogrand, and Arthur Siegel. Having originally wanted to study visual arts, She chose graphic design as a compromise with her parents who strongly preferred that she study journalism so she could take over the family newspaper business. She has been married to her second husband, the Welsh arts administrator Tony Jones, since 1989.

== Career ==
Carroll has been producing photographic artworks since the 1970s. Her work uses highly saturated color photography to explore issues of gender and identity. She is most well known for her series Anonymous Women, begun in 2003, in which women's faces are obscured by being shown hidden behind and intertwined with domestic scenes to symbolize their loss of identity under the shadow of their invisible labor as homemakers and parody the pressures of homemaking. Its initial inspiration was her experience of her domestic status overshadowing her professional status when she moved to London with her husband for his job in the 1990s. Later the contrast between her work of renovating a 1950s house with him and the plight of women becoming homeless at the beginning of the Iraq War in 2003, inspired by her niece's posting there, was the impetus for her to launch the series publicly.

Carroll's work was shown at the Chicago Cultural Center in 2012, exhibited internationally, and later published as a book series. Other collections of works by Carroll that were later published in book form include photographic portraits of Chicago artists made to look like they are trapped in their own works (published in book form in 1991), hot dog stands (photographed between 1987 and 1998), and Elvis impersonators (photographed between 1991 and the early 2000s). She taught photography at various institutions from 1973 to 2014, most notably the Institute of Design at the Illinois Institute of Technology (1977–1992), the Royal College of Art in London (1992–1996), and the School of the Art Institute of Chicago (1999–2014).

== Selected bibliography ==
- Carroll, Patty; Yood, James (1991). Spirited Visions: Portraits of Chicago Artists. University of Illinois Press. ISBN 978-0-252-06220-9.
- Margolin, Victor; Carroll, Patty (2002). Culture is Everywhere: the Museum of Corn-temporary Art. Prestel Publishing. ISBN 978-3-7913-2760-0.
- Carroll, Patty; Codrescu, Andrei; McCranor Henderson, William (2005). Living the Life: The World of Elvis Tribute Artists. Verve Editions. ISBN 978-0-9660352-9-2.
- Kraig, Bruce; Carroll, Patty (2012). Man Bites Dog: Hot Dog Culture in America. AltaMira Press. ISBN 978-0-7591-2074-7.
- Carroll, Patty (2016). Anonymous Women. Daylight Books. ISBN 978-1-942084-19-8.
- Carroll, Patty; Thorn, Bruce (2020). Anonymous Women: Domestic Demise. Ain't Bad. ISBN 978-1-944005-39-9.
- Carroll, Patty (2025). Anonymous Women: Domestic Demise and Debacle. Paper Street. OCLC 1550398115.
