= Rick Saucedo =

American singer and perormer

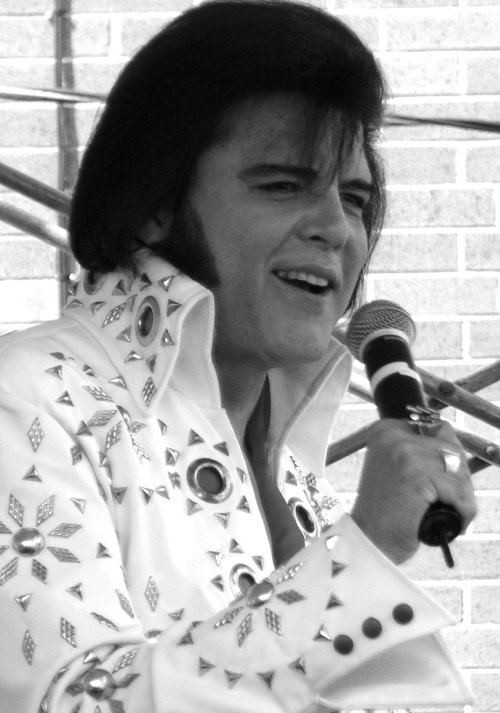
- Born: November 20, 1955 (age 70); Chicago, Illinois, United States
- Website: http://www.ricksaucedo.com

Rick Saucedo (born November 20, 1955) is an American musician, songwriter, actor, and Elvis tribute artist.

Raised in the city of Chicago, Illinois. Saucedo had an increasing interest in music and he had always appreciated the music of Elvis Presley. In 1972, one particular song caught his attention. "Burning Love", which turned out to become the main catalyst for Saucedo and began the creation of his tribute performances to Elvis Presley. At the age of seventeen, Saucedo began performing in nightclubs and bars around Chicago. Upon forming his band The Ambassadors, Saucedo landed the role of Elvis in the 1978 Broadway musical Elvis-The Legend Lives. Along with Elvis' original backup group, The Jordanaires, Elvis' original drummer, D.J. Fontana, and original backup vocalist Millie Kirkham, Saucedo recreated Elvis' career. Ever since, Saucedo has been credited as one of the original Elvis tribute artists. He has been performing longer than Elvis himself did and this became Rick's full-time job before people made habits out of impersonating Elvis. Decades later, Saucedo is still considered one of the top tributes to Elvis and has never stopped entertaining. He performs at clubs, restaurants, festivals, theaters, casinos, banquet halls, and more. Saucedo's schedule has him performing at over one hundred places a year.

== The musician ==
Rick Saucedo is a trained player of acoustic guitar, electric guitar, sitar, bass guitar, drums, piano, and several other instruments. He often incorporates his talents into his performances by playing the piano or guitar for his audiences. Throughout the years, when not performing his Elvis tribute, Saucedo has often played in one of his own rock bands, such as Redwing, The Fabulous Ambassadors, or a Beatles band. In these bands, he often plays his own music, along with singing lead vocals and playing the piano or guitar.

== The tribute artist ==
Saucedo is a versatile Elvis tribute artist. Over time, he has covered all eras of Elvis performance: the Rockabilly '50s, the Rocking '50s Gold, the Army Years, the Movie Era, the Worldwide Hits of the '60s, the '68 Comeback NBC Special, the 1969 International Vegas, the 1970 That's the Way It Is, the 1972 Elvis on Tour, the 1973 Aloha, and the 1977 CBS Elvis In Concert. Saucedo owns a wide variety of Elvis accessories. Through his performances, he has revealed that he has an extensive collection of Elvis' wardrobe: the 1970s jumpsuits, movie wardrobe, GI Army uniform, Black Leather, high-collar shirts, and more. Over time, he has entered the stage equipped with exact replicas of many of Elvis' guitars. Saucedo has a large and diverse collection. Many of his Elvis guitars are not recent reproductions, but original models, such as the electric guitar Elvis used in his 1968 special. It is over forty years old and as authentic as Elvis himself. Though Saucedo has yet to acquire one of Elvis' personally-owned guitars, he does have a guitar owned by John Lennon. If portraying the older Elvis, Rick keeps his hair and sideburns long. If he portrays the earlier Elvis, he styles his hair short and high, allowing him to remain natural and not use any wigs or hairpieces. During his run on Broadway, he was given the title: "The Prince of Rock 'n Roll". Saucedo says he will stop at nothing to give everything he has to his tribute, as quoted in the Chicago Tribune:

"I'll give 150 percent every time, as long as the promoters don't tell me I gotta do this or I gotta do that. I just don't like being told what to do"

== The 1978 Broadway musical ==
Rick Saucedo signed on to play Elvis Presley in the New York Broadway play Elvis-The Legend Lives. Joined with The Jordanaires, D.J. Fontana, Millie Kirkham, and more, Saucedo recreated numerous eras of Elvis Presley's musical career. The play was two acts. Act 1 began with a look at the very beginnings of rock 'n' roll's ties, such as "The Charleston" and "In the Mood". The setting is Sun Studio and a young Elvis Presley (Saucedo) enters the stage and begins recreating Elvis' first recording session. The next scene focuses on The Ed Sullivan Show and Elvis' television performances. Following scenes cover the Army years, the Hollywood songs, and the '68 Comeback. Act 1 ends and Act 2 is an entire concert performance of the 1970s era of Elvis. The title song for the play was a tribute song, "The Legend Lives On", written by Elvis songwriters Doc Pomus and Bruce Foster. Saucedo arranged the music and sang it. The song has become the tagline for his performances. It has been released on 45 vinyl, 8-track, cassette, CD, and DVD. The musical ran for five months and Saucedo played six times a week for the entire five months, never missing a show and never using a double. Opening night was 31 January 1978 and closing night came 30 April 1978. The show became a hit and the following year Saucedo took the show to the Stardust in Las Vegas.

== The bands ==
Saucedo was first seen playing with The Ambassadors. He remained with The Ambassadors full-time for many years until he began performing music different from The King of Rock 'n' Roll. Saucedo performed his own original music and music of The Beatles in the 1980s with his band, Redwing. When he returned to the Elvis format, Saucedo played with pick-up bands and cycled through other bands. In the 1990s, following the breakup of Redwing, Saucedo played again with The Ambassadors, now called The Fabulous Ambassadors. Saucedo always performed with a band until 1997 when he played a one-month-long engagement in Aruba at the Alhambra Casino. With no band available for the engagement, Rick decided to use backing tracks. Performing each night for one month, Saucedo used backing tracks and showed that he was enjoying them more. Upon returning to the states, Saucedo began entering the stage with no equipment but a microphone and speakers. He had made the switch from band to backing tracks. Saucedo uses tracks everywhere he performs except at fests and theatres. For larger venues, he uses live bands. Since switching to tracks in 1997, Saucedo has cycled among three bands: The Ambassadors, The EAS Band and The Change of Habit Tribute Band. Saucedo played with EAS from the late 90s through 2004. Since 2004, it has been Rick Saucedo and the Change of Habit Tribute Band. In 2004, Saucedo reunited with The Ambassadors for a show and has since performed several times with The Ambassadors. Though at this time Rick performs with the Change of Habit as his band, fans can still find a couple of shows a year with Rick Saucedo and The Ambassadors.

== The songwriter ==
Saucedo is an original songwriter who has written dozens of songs, and has completed over fifty. Other songs have incomplete lyrics or music, and thus are yet to be released. Rick begins by creating the music for a song and then it takes anywhere from fifteen minutes to ten years to come up with the perfect lyrics and mix in order for the song to be of releasable quality. As of 2009, Saucedo has written, completed, and released nearly five dozen songs. He has written songs of all kinds, including rock, country, love ballads, rock ballads, slasher songs, gospel, holiday, Elvis-style, Beatles-style, Latin-American, psychedelic, and Elvis tributes. Some original songs Saucedo has never performed live, while others have become regular songs in his performances, and a few are mistaken as Elvis' own. He wrote his first song, "In My Mind", while in junior high in 1968. Saucedo released his first album in 1978 at the age of 23.

=== Original music ===
- Song Title (Decade Written, Genre)
- All Alone Without Love (2010s Ballad)
- All Right Now (1990s Rock)
- America: Red, White, and Blue (2010s Patriotic)
- Aruba (2000s Aruba-Themed Ballad)
- Baby in the Sand (1970s Psychedelic)
- Ballad of Robert Johnson, The (2010s Blues)
- Broken Heart Again (2000s '60s Rock)
- Country Girl (With You) (2000s Country)
- Destiny (1990s Ballad)
- Don't Put Me Down (1990s Ballad)
- Down Stream Dream (1980s Country)
- El Diablo (1990s Latin-American)
- Eleanor (2010s Rock Ballad)
- Evening Glow (1980s Ballad)
- Feeling Love (1980s Ballad)
- Girl in Blue Jeans (2000s Country)
- Good to See Y'All (2000s Country)
- Heart & Soul (1990s Ballad)
- Heartbeat (1980s Rock)
- Heaven Was Blue (1970s Psychedelic)
- Hell Cat (2000s Classic Rock)
- Her Lovin' Arms (2000s Ballad)
- History Makin', Country Shakin' (1970s Rock 'n Roll)
- Hot Tail Mama Blues (2010s Blues)
- I Will Stay (1990s Ballad)
- I'll Die (2000s Ballad)
- I'm Movin' On (2010s Ballad)
- It Burns Again Today (1970s Psychedelic)
- In My Mind (1970s Psychedelic)
- Just a Lie (1980s Rock)
- King of Blue Suede Soul (1970's Elvis tribute song written for Rick Saucedo)
- Lazy Crazy (1980s Rock)
- Legend Lives On, The (1978 Elvis tribute song written for and arranged by Rick Saucedo)
- Livin' Elvis' Life (2010s Elvis tribute song written as an impersonator's perspective)
- Love Inside You (1990s Ballad)
- Love is a Game (1980s Ballad)
- Love Will Grow (1980s Ballad)
- Mama (2000s Tribute to Mothers)
- Meanings (1980s Ballad)
- Memphis, I'm Coming Home (1990s Elvis-tribute)
- Mother Nature's Song (2010s Ballad)
- My Lord (1990s Gospel)
- Nativity (Special Way) (2000s Gospel)
- Next Victim (1990s Slasher)
- Never Let You Go (1990s Ballad)
- No One But You (2000s Rock 'n Roll)
- Oh My Darlynn (I Need You Tonight) (1980s Ballad)
- Oh My God (1970s Psychedelic)
- Once Again (2000s Rock Ballad)
- Our Love (1980s Ballad)
- Passion of Love (1990s Latin-American)
- Pedal to the Metal (2000s Classic Rock)
- Ready Freddy 23 Skidoo Tonight (1990s Rock 'n Roll)
- Reality (1970s Psychedelic)
- Rockabilly Boogie (1970s Rockabilly)
- Rock 'n Roll (1990s Rock 'n Roll)
- Rock 'n Roll Oldies Show (2010s Rock Ballad)
- Rock All Night (1970s Classic Rock)
- Santa and His Reindeer (2000s Holiday)
- Shame, Shame on You (1990s Rock)
- Someone New (2000s Ballad)
- Summer Day (2000s Ballad)
- Tell Me Why (1980s Ballad)
- Things We Say Today (2000s Ballad/Beatles Tribute)
- This Song for You (2000s Ballad)
- Today, Tomorrow, and Forever (1980s Ballad)

== Hollywood ==
Saucedo played Elvis in the 1989 short film Elvis Stories, written and directed by Ben Stiller and starring John Cusack, Mike Myers, Jeremy Piven, and Andy Dick.

Saucedo turned down the title role in Elvis, the 1979 television movie starring Kurt Russell, in order to keep performing and playing Las Vegas. In the late 1990s, a television show was in the works that featured an Elvis character. Saucedo was to play the Elvis character, but the show fell through. Today, Saucedo would rather perform live than act.

== Discography ==
To date, Saucedo has released twenty-one albums, some of which began on vinyl, made it to cassette, and now CD. He began writing and releasing original material in 1978, which was a common practice for him in the 1990s. After an eight-year absence from recording an entirely original album, Saucedo returned to the recording studio in 2006 with new material. In 2009, using fan input, he gathered a selection of his greatest hits and went back to the original recordings to remaster them. Saucedo's most recent projects have been built around the delta blues, rockabilly, and country influences that would eventually lead to rock 'n roll.

=== Albums ===
Album list

- Rick Saucedo Live with the Ambassadors (1976 - Live Recording - Vinyl-CD, Remastered: 2008)
- Heaven Was Blue (1978 - First Original Album; all songs written by Rick - Vinyl-CD)
- Evening Glow (1990 - Second Original Album; all songs written by Rick & Redwing - Cassette-CD)
- The Legend Lives On - Volume 1 (1995 - First Elvis Studio-Recording - Cassette-CD) (discontinued)
- Freak of Nature (1995 - Third Original Album - Remastered/Reissued: 2008)
- Spiritual Christmas (1998 - First Christmas Album - CD)
- Memphis, I'm Coming Home (1999 - Fourth Original Album; all songs written by Rick - CD)
- King of Blue Suede Soul (2002 - Mix of Elvis songs and original work - CD) (discontinued)
- Rick Saucedo Live in Chicago (2004 - Live Recording - CD Reissued: 2008)
- History Makin', Country Shakin' (2006 - Fifth Original Album and more - CD)
- The Love Inside You - Sounds of the '60s (2007 - Sixth Original Album plus Elvis material - CD)
- Redwing - The Essential 1980's (2007 - Compilation Album, Elvis, Beatles, includes Evening Glow album - CD)
- The Elvis Story: The Legend Lives On (2007 - Condensed, modern, newly recorded version of 1978 Elvis Broadway Musical - CD)
- Rick Saucedo's Halloween Party (2007 - Live Version of Heaven Was Blue and Halloween classics - CD)
- That's The Way It Was (2008 - Live Album with Bonus Studio Recordings - CD)
- Once Again: The Greatest Hits (2009 - Studio Compilation Album - CD)
- Traditional Christmas (2009 - Second Christmas Album - CD)
- The Wonder Of You (2011 - Studio Compilation Album - CD)
- I'm Movin' On (2011 - Seventh Original Album - CD)
- Mountain Moonshine (2012 - Eighth Original Album - CD)
- The City of Night Lights (2013 - Ninth Original Album - CD)

=== Singles ===
- Reality/History Makin', Country Shakin' (1978 - Vinyl)
- The Legend Lives On/How Great Thou Art (1978 - Vinyl)
- The King of Blue Suede Soul/Jailhouse Rock (1970s - Vinyl)
- Too Much/Dead Man's Curve (1980s - Vinyl)
- Santa and His Reindeer/The Nativity (2012 - iTunes release)

== Awards and accomplishments ==
Saucedo has earned the status of one of the most respected in the Elvis tribute artist business, having won a variety of awards and honors over the years. One award he has won time and time again is a Suburban NiteLife "Best of the Burbs" award. Every year Suburban NiteLife, one of the top suburban Chicago entertainment magazines, awards the best clubs, bartenders, bands, and more of the preceding year. Saucedo has won the 'Best Solo Performer' award multiple times since the 1990s - most recently in 2009, voted in by numerous fans as the best in that category for the year before. Previous nominations have come in 2006 for the "Best Band" award when he performs with his band and in the past he has also won the "Best Male Entertainer" award for Suburban NiteLife. In addition to winning the 'Best Solo Performer' awards for 2006, 2007, and 2008. He has also won 'Best Lounge Act' for 2008 and 2009. In 2011, Saucedo was honored twice with two new, prestigious awards. On July 29, 2011, he was awarded the first ever Lifetime Achievement Award at the Heart Of The King Awards of the Las Vegas Elvis Fest at the Las Vegas Hilton, on the same stage that Elvis himself performed on for 7 years. Less than a month later, Saucedo was the first inductee into the Elvis Tribute Artist Hall Of Fame, through the inaugural King Of The World event in Memphis, TN. Both awards have cited Saucedo's persistence, longevity, success, and dedication to forty years in the Elvis tribute business. In 2014, The Chicago Music Awards recognized Saucedo's accomplishments in both songwriting and as an Elvis tribute artist with a Lifetime Achievement Award.

== Online media/Heartbeat Radio ==
Since 2007, Saucedo's Internet presence has grown rapidly. In June 2007, live footage of Rick had made its way online for the first time as videos of his performances were uploaded to YouTube. The videos have allowed people from all over the world to see Saucedo online. For some, this was for the first time. Since then, dozens of his performances have been uploaded onto YouTube through the courtesy of his crew, fans and other YouTube users. Saucedo's internet presence grew again when his official MySpace launched on January 10, 2008. The MySpace focused on fan interaction, updates on Saucedo, interactive music and movies, and news related to him. In October 2008, Saucedo's official profile launched on TributesRadio, a website for online tribute artists and their fans. In May 2009, his online fan base shifted from MySpace when he joined Facebook. Saucedo's new profile page allowed for more intimate and interactive communication between him and his fans that was never before available. In March 2009, Saucedo launched his first radio program, entitled Heartbeat Radio. It aired every other Sunday at BlogTalkRadio, an online radio website. The show focused on Saucedo's original songwriting and featured programming that highlighted his writing style, influences, songbook, and the stories associated with them. The show's initial run culminated in January 2010.
