= Robert Washington (impersonator) =

American Elvis impersonator (born 1958)

- Also known as: "Black Elvis"
- Born: August 16, 1958 (age 68); St. Louis, Missouri, United States
- Occupations: Entertainer, singer
- Years active: 1983 – present

Robert Washington (born August 16, 1958) is an American Elvis impersonator who has won many Elvis competitions in the United States. Washington is African American, and was the first African American to win the World Champion Elvis Impersonator title. Sam Thompson, a former bodyguard of Elvis Presley, once commented on Washington's close resemblance to Presley's sound.

== Personal ==
Washington grew up in St. Louis, Missouri. In 1974, he attended an Elvis Presley concert. The day that Presley died in 1977, Washington was at Marine boot camp, and it also happened to be his 19th birthday. He served in the United States Marine Corps until 1981.

== Career ==
Washington's early performances were singing for family and friends, after Presley's death. In the early 1980s, Washington lip-synced Elvis tunes in a stage act. He quotes 1983 as his first career stage appearance. He later branched out into competitions using his own voice.

Washington's act has concentrated on the 1968 era of Presley, around the time of Elvis's comeback television special.

He appeared in the 2000 television documentary Elvis and the Men who would be King. Footage of Washington was also included in the 2001 documentary Almost Elvis, which filmed him during 1999.

=== Contests ===
By August 2001, he had appeared at ten "Images of the King" impersonation contests in Memphis. He won the event in 2003.

In December 2013, he was voted number one in the Online Viewer's Choice Award on the Elvis World Championships website.

=== Shows ===
In 2007, Washington toured Europe with the "Original Elvis Tribute" and received many positive reviews.

In January 2013, he appeared at the Capitol Theater in Olympia, Washington. In July 2012, he was booked to do two shows in Aroostook County. His show at the time consisted of two sets: one from Presley's earlier days, and a second from his 1970s Las Vegas period.

== Films ==
- Elvis and the Men who would be King – 2000, television documentary
- Almost Elvis – 2001, documentary
- The Notebook – 2004, feature film
- Baby Let's Play House – 2008, short film
- The Faithful: The King, the Pope, the Princess - in post-production As of 2016, feature film

== See also ==
- Clearance Giddens, another African American Elvis impersonator
