= Elvis impersonator =

Musician who performs in the style of Elvis Presley

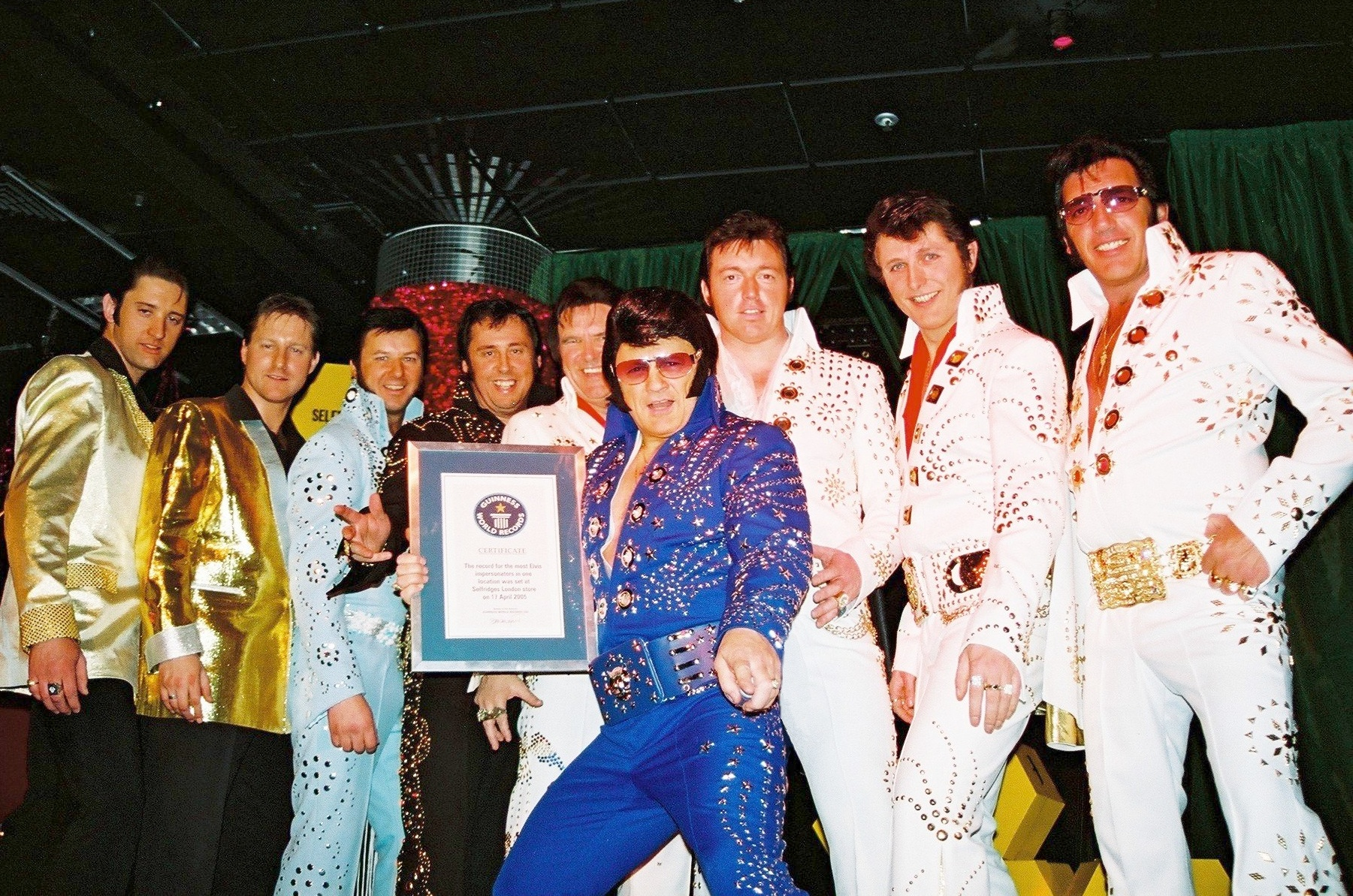
Several Elvis impersonators at the Selfridges flagship store in London, 2005

An Elvis impersonator is an entertainer who impersonates or copies the look and sound of American rock singer Elvis Presley. Professional Elvis impersonators, commonly known as Elvis tribute artists (ETAs), work all over the world as entertainers, and such tribute acts remain in great demand due to the iconic status of Elvis Presley. Some of these impersonators go to Graceland in Memphis, Tennessee, on the anniversary of Presley's death to pay tribute to the beloved artist.

While some impersonators perform a wide variety of Presley's discography, his songs from the 1950s and 1970s remained fan favorites as of 1997.

== Origins ==
=== Contemporaneous ===
Elvis impersonators have existed since the mid-1950s, just after Elvis Presley himself began his career. The first known Elvis impersonator was a young man named Carl 'Cheesie' Nelson from Texarkana, Arkansas, who in 1954 built up a local following on WLAC radio with his renditions of "That's All Right, Mama" and "Blue Moon of Kentucky". Nelson even performed alongside Presley when they first met, also in 1954. The friendship between Nelson and Presley is documented in the book "Elvis in Texas".

The second known impersonator was a 16-year-old boy named Jim Smith. In 1956, shortly after Elvis began to rise in popularity, Smith began jumping on stage and imitating Elvis. Smith's physical resemblance to Elvis and his mannerisms happened to catch the attention of Canadian DJ Norm Pringle of Victoria, British Columbia, who had been playing "That's All Right, Mama" and "Heartbreak Hotel" on the radio. Smith was featured several times on Pringle's regular TV show, though Smith only lip synced to the music, since he could not actually sing or play the guitar at that time.

Many other Elvis impersonators appeared while Elvis was still alive, evolving mainly out of small town talent competitions which took their influences from major music artists of that time. Some of his contemporaries included Rick Saucedo of Chicago and Johnny Harra, a Kansas City native who started in 1958 and moved his show to Texas in 1977.

Dave Ehlert from Waukegan, Illinois began performing as Elvis in 1967, 10 years before Elvis died. Ehlert performed throughout the Chicago Metro Area until Elvis's death, then traveled the country with his act. He was on hand for the first anniversary of Elvis' death at the Prince William County Fair in Manassas, Virginia on August 16, 1978 and has continuously performed his Elvis tribute act for almost 50 years, including performances in Las Vegas and (beginning in 1993 and lasting for several decades) headlining an Elvis tribute show in Branson, Missouri.

=== Posthumous ===
After Presley's death on August 16, 1977, the amount of impersonators increased, with the upward trend continuing still.

American protest singer Phil Ochs appeared in concert in March 1970 at Carnegie Hall wearing a 1950s Elvis-style gold lamé suit, made for him by Presley's costumer Nudie Cohn. His performance may be considered the first significant Elvis impersonation. Jeremy Spencer of British blues-rock band Fleetwood Mac became known for his high-energy Elvis tribute performances during his tenure with the band. Spencer would perform as Elvis (often in a gold lamé suit) as the main part of a mini-set in which he also did other impersonations of figures such as Buddy Holly and slide guitarist Elmore James.

In the mid-1970s, Andy Kaufman made an Elvis impersonation part of his act. He is considered to be one of the first notable Elvis impersonators and even Presley himself allegedly said that Kaufman was his favorite impersonator. In his act, Kaufman would precede with several failed impersonations before unexpectedly launching into a skilled impersonation of Elvis Presley. As Kaufman gained fame, the impersonation was used less and less.

=== Myth ===
In 2005, Weekly World News alleged that Presley himself entered an Elvis lookalike contest at a local restaurant shortly before his death and came in third place. This claim is unfounded. The joke may have its origins in a similar myth about Charlie Chaplin entering such a contest, which too has been disproved.

== Types of impersonators ==
There are many different types of Elvis impersonators and Elvis tribute artists. Most fall under the following categories:

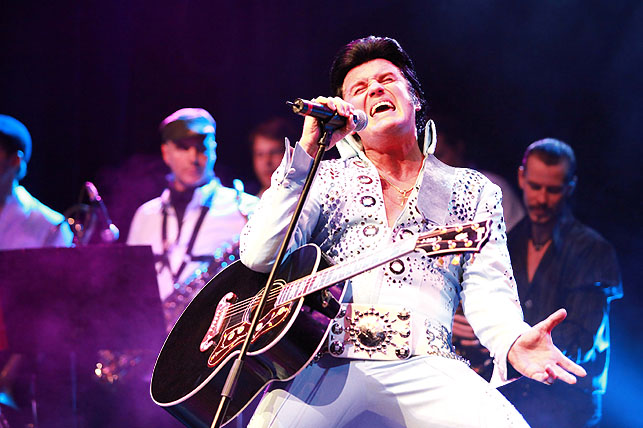
An impersonator performing as Elvis

- Look-alikes, who concentrate more on visual elements of Elvis fashion and style using accessories such as wigs and fake sideburns (if necessary), costumes and jewelry. A common example of this type are male Elvis fans (although they may not sing or have a performing career) who limit their impersonation only to combing or styling their hair or growing sideburns in the style of Presley in their everyday lives.
- Sound-alikes, who concentrate on changing their voice to sing or talk like Elvis. Notable examples of this type include country artists Ronnie McDowell, Jimmy Ellis and rock 'n' roll artists including Terry Stafford and Ral Donner. Kurt Russell did this type of Elvis impersonation in his 1994 film, Forrest Gump, even though he was uncredited for his voice role of Elvis. Donner served as voice-over narrator in the 1981 documentary This Is Elvis, changing his speaking voice to sound like Presley. McDowell recorded covers of Presley's songs in the style of Presley for use in several made-for-TV Presley biopics, such as Elvis (1979) and Elvis and Me.
- Combination, who use a combination of both the visual and aural methods listed above. Country singer Billy "Crash" Craddock was an example of this in the 1970s. Actor Kurt Russell was an example of this type in 1979 film Elvis and in his 2001 film, 3000 Miles to Graceland. Professional ETAs normally fall under this type.
- Pastiche, who look like, sound like, and write songs in the style of Elvis. David Daniel, called the Great Pretender, performs dozens of originals in the style of Elvis.

== Level of impersonation ==
There are different levels of impersonation, which depends largely on who is doing the impersonation and for what purpose. They mainly fall under three main levels of impersonation:

=== Elvis Tribute Artist (ETA) ===
An Elvis tribute artist (ETA) is a full- or part-time, serious Elvis impersonator who is in the business of performing for a living. One such artist is Blake Rayne (real name Ryan Pelton), a Screen Actors Guild member who created his Elvis tribute act during pre-production of The Identical in 2012.

Enacting a typical '70s Elvis concert is a preferred choice of most ETAs; however, some ETAs may portray various phases of Presley's career in a single show. For example, an ETA may open his show with a '50s set dressed in appropriate attire (such as a gold lame jacket), reenactments of musical scenes from Presley's movies or reenactments of segments from the '68 Comeback Special; and after an intermission closes his show with a full-blown 70s concert dressed in an appropriate jumpsuit.

Some ETAs perform with a live band in the style of the TCB Band, complete with a brass ensemble and background singers to add to the originality; while others rely solely on karaoke for their performances. However, some ETAs may utilize both a live band and karaoke (either one or the other, in most cases depending on the type and size of the venue).

Some ETAs record CDs to sell at their shows, which of course contain many of the Presley standards, but could also include some of their own songs as well as songs of other artists.

Some ETAs perform under stage names, mostly using names associated in some way with Presley's life or career (such as Presley's character names in his movies).

=== Amateur ===
Amateur impersonators are enthusiasts who impersonate Presley in contests, for a hobby, or at social gatherings (such as parties, reunions, etc.). Most of this type of impersonator aspires to become professional ETAs.

=== Fun or comedy ===
This is usually done as part of a parody. Clownvis Presley is an example of a performing combining Elvis impersonation, comedy, and original compositions in the style of Elvis.

== Impersonation derivatives ==
"There are heavily-bearded Elvis, four-year-old Elvis, and Elvis duos; Italian Elvis, Greek Elvis, Fat Elvis, a Lady Elvis, even a Black Elvis. Impersonator impresario Ed Franklin boasts, 'We've had every type of Elvis there is in the world.'" Professional Elvis impersonation can be called a special branch of the entertainment industry. "Michael Chapa, an Elvis impersonator who works in Los Angeles and Las Vegas, helped entertain more than 2500 of his relatives at what is believed to be the country's largest Hispanic family reunion ..."

There are also some Elvis impersonators who specialize in experimenting with gender, sexuality, race, taste and decency. According to social historian Eric Lott, "the widespread embarrassment and innuendo surrounding Elvis impersonation points more directly to the homoerotic implications built into such acts." There are even some performers who satirize other Elvis impersonators.

According to Gael Sweeney, Elvis impersonation offers a spectacle of the grotesque, the display of the fetishized Elvis body by impersonators who use a combination of Christian and New Age imagery and language to describe their devotion to The King. 'True' impersonators believe that they are 'chosen' by The King to continue His work and judge themselves and each other by their 'Authenticity' and ability to 'Channel' Elvis' true essence. True impersonators don't 'do Elvis' for monetary gain, but as missionaries to spread the message of The King. Especially interesting are those who do not perform, per se, that is, they don't do an Elvis act, they just 'live Elvis,' dressing as The King and spreading His Word by their example."

However, the Elvis industry includes "professional Elvis impersonator registries." The international guide I am Elvis, for instance, contains "photos, repertoire, and personal testimonies that serve to materialize the phenomenon of Elvis impersonation and further institutionalize it, including female Elvii, child Elvii, Black Elvii, El Vez the Mexican Elvis, and scores of British, German, Greek and Indian Elvii." According to George Plasketes, there are "legions of impersonators. Airlines have offered discount fares for look-alikes on Elvis holidays... His omnipresence hauntingly hovers..."

In August 1996, Elvis Herselvis, a female Elvis impersonator and drag king, who had been invited to take part in the Second International Elvis Presley Conference held at the University of Mississippi in order "to test the limits of race, class, sexuality and property...," was banned from this event by the conservative sponsors of Elvis Presley Enterprises.

== Contests, festivals and events ==
There are many Elvis contests for amateurs, festivals and other events held across the world celebrating Elvis Presley and his many impersonators. Events tend to attract large numbers of amateur Elvis impersonators and Elvis fans.

The Ultimate Elvis Tribute Artist competition, for example, is held every year in Graceland. In 2023, Cote Deonath won the title after having placed in the top 10 for 6 years.

CKX, Inc., which now owns Elvis Presley's estate, has full control including the grave of Elvis Presley and his family members along with his home Graceland in early 2008. This has seen some impact on what Elvis impersonators and contests have on the media and marketing industry. They began using the contest along with their Elvis brand, licensing anyone wanting to charge a fee to hold an Elvis contest.

The small western New South Wales town of Parkes in Australia has been hosting the Parkes Elvis Festival since 1993, which includes a special "Elvis Express" train from Sydney to Parkes.

In Las Vegas (the city where the real Elvis married Priscilla Presley), there are some wedding chapels where the ceremony can include an ETA. Blackpool in the UK features a busy Elvis wedding chapel based at the Norbreck Castle Hotel, Queens promenade, where couples can have their wedding vows renewed by Martin Fox.

The largest gathering of Elvis impersonators occurred on July 12, 2014, when 895 impersonators gathered in the Harrah's Cherokee Casino Resort in Cherokee, North Carolina.

== In the media ==
=== Literature ===
A number of books are available on the topic of Elvis tribute artists. One of the first books to document the phenomenon was I Am Elvis: A Guide to Elvis Impersonators released by American Graphic Systems in 1991. More recent titles include photo essays, Living the Life by Patty Carroll and The King and I: A little Gallery of Elvis Impersonators by Kent Baker and Karen Pritkin.

Novelist William McCranor Henderson wrote about his attempts to learn the Elvis trade in, I, Elvis: Confessions of a Counterfeit King.

A more scholarly examination of Elvis impersonation is, Impersonating Elvis by Leslie Rubinowski released in 1997. On "the thriving phenomenon of Elvis impersonators", see also Gilbert B. Rodman, Elvis After Elvis: The Posthumous Career of a Living Legend (1996). In the Summer 1997 issue of The Oxford American magazine author Tom Graves wrote an acclaimed article, Natural Born Elvis, about the first Elvis impersonator, Bill Haney, the only tribute artist Elvis himself ever went to see perform. The article has been published in the anthology The Oxford American Book of Great Music Writing and the anthology Louise Brooks, Frank Zappa, & Other Charmers & Dreamers by Tom Graves.

There are also several university studies, for instance, Eric Lott's critical essay, "All the King's Men: Elvis Impersonators and White Working-Class Masculinity," published in Harry Stecopoulos and Michael Uebel, eds., Race and the Subject of Masculinities (Duke University Press, 1997). The author, professor of American Studies at the University of Virginia, has also written a long piece on Elvis impersonators and the EPIIA (Elvis Presley Impersonators International Association) to be published in his next book. For this paper, he interviewed many impersonators and draws parallels with minstrelsy. "It is indeed one place minstrelsy ends up; where 19th-century white guys imitated what they thought of as slave culture and Elvis took from R & B performers, the impersonators copy the copy, if you will—it's minstrelsy once-removed." In her paper, "Women Who 'Do Elvis'", Case Western Reserve University researcher Francesca Brittan deals with female Elvis Presley impersonators and finds them to be "campy, cheeky, and often disturbingly convincing." According to Marjorie Garber's academic study, Vested Interests: Cross-dressing and Cultural Anxiety (1992), Elvis impersonation is so insistently connected with femininity that it is "almost as if the word 'impersonator', in contemporary popular culture, can be modified either by 'female' or by 'Elvis.'"

In the 2011 novel Donations to Clarity by Noah Baird, one of the main characters — the town's sheriff — is an Elvis impersonator.

=== Films ===
3000 Miles to Graceland is a 2001 thriller film, starring Kurt Russell, Kevin Costner, Courteney Cox Arquette, David Arquette, Bokeem Woodbine, Christian Slater, and Kevin Pollak. It is a story of theft and betrayal, revolving around a plot to rob the Riviera Casino during a convention of Elvis impersonators in Las Vegas. The films also featured many real Elvis Tribute Artists from Las Vegas as background players, dancers and extras.

Bubba Ho-Tep is the title of a novella by Joe R. Lansdale which originally appeared in the anthology The King Is Dead: Tales of Elvis Post-Mortem (edited by Paul M. Sammon, Delta 1994) and was adapted as a 2002 horror-black comedy film starring Bruce Campbell as Elvis Presley—who escaped the pressures of his fame long ago by impersonating an Elvis impersonator and is now a resident in a nursing home. The film version also stars Ossie Davis as Jack, a black man who claims to be John F. Kennedy. He says he was patched up after the assassination in Dallas, dyed black, and abandoned by Lyndon B. Johnson. The film was directed by Don Coscarelli.

Honeymoon in Vegas is a 1992 comedic movie which was directed by Andrew Bergman. Jack Singer, played by Nicolas Cage, encounters a group of "Flying Elvises" (skydiving Elvis impersonators) while trying to reunite with his fiancée. Pop singer Bruno Mars, only six years old at the time, has a small role as a young Elvis impersonator. It also featured Clearance Giddens, a black Elvis.

Almost Elvis is a 75-minute 2001 documentary film that follows a variety of professional Elvis impersonators such as they prepare for a large annual contest in Memphis, Tennessee.

Elvis Extravaganza is a 60-minute 2009 Elvis impersonator documentary featuring amateur Elvis impersonators and their quest for the title of the "World's Finest Elvis Impersonator."

Elvis Has Left the Building a film in which a woman kills multiple Elvis impersonators.

Lilo & Stitch is a 2002 animated Disney movie that has Stitch, a blue alien, impersonate Elvis for a scene. The film's soundtrack contains multiple Elvis songs with the titular Hawaiian girl named Lilo being a huge fan.

Happy Feet is a 2006 animated movie where the protagonist's father, Memphis, is an Elvis caricature donning his iconic wiggle and voice.

The Boss Baby is a 2017 animated DreamWorks movie that has the titular baby and a boy named Tim board a plane of Elvis impersonators so they can get to Las Vegas to stop his nemesis from enacting his evil plan.

=== Television ===
The plot of the Father Ted episode "Competition Time" revolves around the three main characters Father Ted Crilly, Father Dougal McGuire and Father Jack Hackett entering the "All Priests Stars in Their Eyes Lookalike Competition". Due to confusion about who is going as Elvis all three do it, appearing in sequence as Elvis at different stages of his career, winning the competition.

Jeff Yagher played an Elvis impersonator (as well as Elvis himself) in an episode of The Twilight Zone called "The Once and Future King". The man who played Elvis' boss at the Crown Electric company was Red West, a real life schoolmate and best friend of Elvis.

In the Sledge Hammer! episode "All Shook Up", Hammer (David Rasche) investigates a string of Elvis impersonator murders by participating in a contest as one.

In the Digimon Adventure anime, one of the main villains, Etemon has the character of an Elvis impersonator.

In the Sons of Anarchy series, Robert 'Bobby Elvis' Munson (Mark Boone Junior), one of the main characters, does Elvis impersonations in Lake Tahoe, leading to him sometimes being referred to as Elvis.

In an episode of Married... with Children, the character Peggy Bundy claims to have seen Elvis at a mall, prompting a large number of Elvis impersonators to come to her home so she can share her "experience".

In a 2006 episode of How I Met Your Mother – Nothing Good Happens After 2 A.M. (S1-E18) - Marshall and Lily are serenaded by a Korean Elvis impersonator played by George Cheung.

In "Meltdown", an episode of the British TV series Red Dwarf, Clayton Mark portrays a 'wax droid' version of Elvis who, under the command of Arnold Rimmer along with other 'wax world' historical figures, is engaged in battle with the evil historical figures. In the end credits of the episode, Mark sings the theme tune in the style of Elvis.

In an episode of the American sitcom The Golden Girls, the characters of Blanche and Rose are considering hiring an Elvis impersonator for their "Hunka Hunka Burnin' Love Fan Club", yet Rose mixes up the Elvis list with the guest list for the wedding of the character of Sophia. As a result, Sophia's wedding reception is filled with Elvis impersonators (one played by a young Quentin Tarantino) instead of members of her own family, and Rose exclaims, "Either I got the Elvis list mixed with the guest list for the wedding or everyone in Sophia's family appeared on The Ed Sullivan Show!"

In "Wedding Card", an episode of the Canadian sitcom Corner Gas, Oscar and Emma Leroy admit to having no photos of their wedding because "it was an Elvis wedding". Their fellow townspeople understand this sentiment, but in the final scene they are shown burning those selfsame photographs, which display both Oscar and Emma dressed as Elvis.

In the "Boo Haw Haw" Halloween special of Cartoon Network's Ed, Edd n Eddy, one of the titular characters named Eddy is dressed-up as a zombie Elvis for trick-or-treating.

The main character of Cartoon Network's Johnny Bravo is heavily influenced by Elvis along with James Dean and Michael Jackson. The original unaired pilot even had Johnny Bravo as a literal Elvis Presley impersonator.

The Disney Channel sitcoms Hannah Montana and The Suite Life of Zack & Cody both featured main characters dressing up and acting like Elvis. The Martin twins dressed-up as twin-Elvises in an episode of The Suite Life where they were appearing on a gameshow called "Risk It All!", and Miley's brother Jackson, in Hannah Montana, impersonated Elvis twice: The first time was to fool a gossip reporter, as a coverup, after Miley accidentally blabbed the Hannah-secret to her; and the second time was when Miley and Lily impersonated Dolly Parton and Miley's "Mamaw" Ruthie, respectively, after it came out that Ruthie and Dolly (portrayed by Parton herself) had a fight over Elvis Presley.

In an episode of Due South, season 1, episode 10, "The Gift of the Wheelman", it's Christmas time and the police station is filled with Santas, elves and Elvises.

A season one episode of Full House had the character Uncle Jesse (John Stamos) play Elvis in a concert.

Talent shows focused on imitating already famous singers will often have Elvis impersonators. i.e., the Chilean version of the European show My name is... featured at least three of them.

An advertisement for State Farm Insurance featured four Elvis impersonators, each of which performed the company's "magic jingle" in succession, causing representatives from the company to appear out of thin air. The final Elvis impersonator made a splash by parachuting in on top of a car.

The 24th season of the American adaptation of Big Brother featured Daniel Durston, an Elvis impersonator from Las Vegas, Nevada. Durston was the fifth houseguest evicted, lasting 37 days in the house.

In an episode of Friday Night Dinner, Jonny Goodman is said to have been married to his girlfriend by an Elvis impersonator, to which Jackie Goodman exclaims, "You got married by an Elvis?!".

In the 2005 VeggieTales episode "Lord of the Beans" (parodying The Lord of the Rings trilogy), Larry the Cucumber appears as an "Elfish" impersonator.

=== Video games ===
In Civilization II, the "Attitude" Advisor in the player's "High Council", who advises on the peoples' happiness, is an Elvis Presley caricature, depicted wearing sunglasses even in the Ancient period. He is played by Frank Wagner.

In Fallout: New Vegas, the Kings are an Elvis-themed gang based out of the "King's School of Impersonation". Despite matching his attire, hairstyle and voice, the Kings are unaware of Elvis as a historical musician, not even knowing what his name was – only that he must have been worshiped for there to be a building dedicated to teaching people to imitate him.

In later levels of Theme Hospital, patients arrive at the hospital suffering from "King Complex". Symptoms of the condition included the patient dressing up like Elvis, wearing a white/grey jacket with a red music note at its back, matching trousers, sunglasses and Elvis' famous hairdo. It is cured by visiting a psychologist, who tells the patient how ridiculous he/she looks.

In Grand Theft Auto: San Andreas, Elvis impersonators are a type of pedestrians commonly spawned in the Las Venturas (which is modelled after Las Vegas) area of the map. Additionally, in GTA 2 Elvis impersonators are a type of pedestrians that spawn occasionally in all the maps in groups of six, killing them all quickly will grant the player $32000 bonus points.

In The Legend of Zelda: Wind Waker, a dancer named Tott with a striking resemblance to Elvis Presley appears on Windfall Island.

=== Plays ===
One of the most popular modern plays dealing with Elvis impersonation is Lee Hall's Cooking with Elvis (1999). The comedy centers on the family life of Dad, an Elvis impersonator who was paralyzed in a car crash and is forced to spend the rest of his life in a wheel chair. Climaxes of the play are surreal fantasy scenes in which Dad's hallucinatory Elvis dreams are bursting into popular Presley songs as a reminiscence of his one-time persona of Elvis impersonator.

Playwright Charlotte Jones' award-winning play "Martha, Josie and the Chinese Elvis" opened April 15, 1999, at the Octagon Theatre, Bolton. The play features a Chinese Elvis impersonator called Timothy Wong, who transforms the lives of the characters in the play.

Another popular theater event has been the "Elvis Story" over the last five years. Different Elvis artists have been in the main role with very detailed outfits, wigs and props. This has prompted other impersonators, like Mark Lee Pringle of Ohio, to include these details in their shows. Mark portrays the 1950s rock-a-billy era complete with exact replicas of all of Elvis' performance guitars and stage clothes from 1954 to 1958, as well as old 1950s RCA microphones and even a full-size Nipper dog statue on-stage (Mark is the only impersonator that uses RCA's Nipper).

=== Influences in academia ===
In paleontology, researchers D.H. Erwin and M.L. Droser in a 1993 paper derived from the Elvis impersonators the term Elvis taxon (plural Elvis taxa), which denotes a taxon that has been misidentified as having re-emerged in the fossil record after a period of presumed extinction, but is not actually a descendant of the original taxon, instead having developed a similar morphology through convergent evolution. A humorous example of mathematical extrapolation posits that if the growth of Elvis impersonators continued at the rate it did since 1977, by 2043, all humans on earth would be Elvis impersonators.

=== Politics ===
An Elvis impersonator in Arkansas, who legally had his name changed to Elvis Presley, unsuccessfully ran for the positions of Arkansas Commissioner of State Lands in 2014, Arkansas State Senator of District 26 in 2016, and U.S. Representative of Arkansas's District 1 in 2018.

== Elvis impersonators around the world ==
=== Australia ===
Mike Cole

Mike Cole is an Elvis impersonator best known for appealing to the elderly in Melbournes Outer Eastern suburbs with a career spanning several decades.

=== New Zealand ===
Steve Fitter

Steve Fitter is an Elvis impersonator from Waikato. On May 15, 2011, he entered the Elvis Down Under competition in Upper Hutt. The three songs he sang were, "If I Can Dream", "Kentucky Rain" and "Polk Salad Annie". He was the winner of the competition. In the following month, he was off to compete at the Wintersun Festival in New South Wales. In February 2013, he was set to appear at the annual fourth tribute to Elvis Presley event, held at the Auckland Botanic Gardens in Manurewa, Auckland. Elvis impersonators set to appear besides Fitter were Brendon Chase, Melissa Perkins and Kerryn Winn. Dean Vegas and Paul Fenech from Australia were also booked for the event.

Des Perenara aka Elvis Desley

Des Perenara, a Maori Elvis comes from Auckland but is now based in Cardigan, Wales. He has taken part in the Porthcawl Elvis Festival. His day job is at BGT Laboratories in Ffostrasol, which makes antidote products including snake anti-venom. He once sang some songs on Karaoke at a 30th birthday party which his mother in law loved. It was her motivation that helped him become an Elvis tribute artist. He appeared in episode 3 of the BBC Two Wales documentary, Cardigan Bay Coastal Lives.

Andy Stankovich

Andy Stankovich is a well known Elvis impersonator from Auckland, New Zealand. He has been performing as Elvis since around 2000. Besides performing throughout New Zealand, he has performed in Australia, Hawaii, Fiji and the United States.

=== Pacific Islands ===
==== Samoa ====
There have been at least three prominent Elvis impersonators of Samoan descent.

Mr. Fatu

During the 1970s, a star attraction at the Aloha Lounge in Florida's Hawaiian Inn was Mr. Fatu. At the time, he was referred to as the greatest Elvis impressionist around. Following a break, he was back December 1976. The following year in August 1977, he was appearing at the Colonial Inn, fronting a nine-piece band called Coastal Connection. Among the LP albums he recorded were his 1976 album, Mr. Fatu Sings Elvis, which was recorded live at The Hawaiian Inn, and Manatua Mai A'u (Remember Me), released on the Tam-Bay label. His single "Love's Not Made of Time" by "God Will Rule" was produced by John Centinaro, who would work with another Elvis impersonator, Johnny Charro. Another single of his, released on the Fire Mountain label in 1980, "Just One Look" by "Darling" is a sought-after collector's item.

Sam Leilani

During the early 1990s, Sam Leilani from Reseda, L.A. made the news briefly. He was a former dancer with a Polynesian troupe. Leilani, who had referred to himself as a "rock 'n' roll-singing Polynesian guy", had formed a rockabilly band in the early 90s and had performed in Hawaii. He would be in the traditional Elvis dress from the waist up, but from below the waist was in Bermuda shorts and bare feet.

Alphonso Keil

Alphonso Keil was an Elvis impersonator and professional musician. He was born in Samoa in 1944, came to New Zealand as a boy. He was from the same family that made up the Keil Isles. During the 1960s, he played rhythm guitar with The Zodiacs and then The Kavaliers, a group fronted by his brother Freddie. Keil was influenced by Elvis impersonator Andy Stankovich who he saw live. In the late 90s he started up a group called Alphonso Keil and the Kavaliers. He performed regularly at the Elvis in the Park concerts at Cranwell Park in Henderson, Auckland, New Zealand, New Zealand. He died at age 64 in July 2008, after battling cancer.

Johnny Angel

Another Elvis impersonator of Samoan descent is Johnny Angel. He is a published author and has appeared on New Zealand television in ads, Like Minds, Like Mine. Like Alphonso Keil before him, Angel regularly performs at the Parkes Elvis Festival, an event that now attracts 20,000. He was there in 2016 for the event, and in there in 2018.

Others

=== Asia ===
==== Hong Kong ====
Kwok Lam-sang, known as Melvis, was a long-time Elvis impersonator in Hong Kong. He died at the end of 2020.

==== Malaysia ====
Malaysia has Tony Warren who is known as "the Tom Jones of Malaysia". He also has an Elvis tribute act. He has been performing since the late 1960s and in the 1980s was performing at the Copper Grill in The Weld on Jalan Raja Chulan, Kuala Lumpur, and in later years at the Royal Selangor Club in Dataran Merdeka.

==== Philippines ====
The Philippines has its own Elvis Presley impersonator, Filipino singer, and actor Eddie Mesa, dubbed as the Elvis Presley of The Philippines. Eddie is still performing mostly in bars or 6-star hotels, especially with Elvis impersonators. Another Filipino Elvis impersonator is singer businessman Chito Bertol who also impersonates Elvis Presley mostly at Bistro RJ Bar in Makati City, and sometimes occasionally performs every year with Filipino singer businessman Ramon Jacinto who was the founder of Bistro RJ and his radio station DZRJ 100.3 FM & his TV station DZRJ TV 29 in the Philippines.

==== Europe ====
In the Netherlands, Bouke Scholten is popular. He won Tribute: Battle of the Bands, as well as shows like Waar is Elvis (Where is Elvis) or All Together Now.

United States

Elvis' home country of the United States is where Elvis impersonators are most prevalent. The most notable impersonators are Dean Z, Matt Stone, Shawn Klush, Cote Deonath, Jimmy Holmes, Moses Snow, and Dwight Icenhower.

== See also ==
- Impersonator
- Look-alike
- Madonna impersonator
- Michael Jackson impersonator
- Tom Jones impersonator
- Tribute band
