= Honeymoon in Vegas =

1992 film by Andrew Bergman

- Theatrical release poster
- Directed by: Andrew Bergman
- Written by: Andrew Bergman
- Produced by: Mike Lobell
- Starring: James Caan; Nicolas Cage; Sarah Jessica Parker; Pat Morita
- Cinematography: William A. Fraker
- Edited by: Barry Malkin
- Music by: David Newman
- Production companies: Castle Rock Entertainment; New Line Cinema
- Distributed by: Columbia Pictures
- Release date: August 28, 1992
- Running time: 96 minutes
- Country: United States
- Language: English
- Budget: $25 million
- Box office: $35 million

Honeymoon in Vegas is a 1992 American romantic comedy film written and directed by Andrew Bergman and starring James Caan, Nicolas Cage and Sarah Jessica Parker.

Honeymoon in Vegas was released by Columbia Pictures on August 28, 1992. The film received positive reviews from critics and grossed $35 million against a $25 million budget.

== Plot ==
Private eye Jack Singer swore to his mother on her deathbed that he would never marry. His girlfriend Betsy wants to get married and start a family, and he proposes a quick Las Vegas marriage. They check into the Bally's Casino Resort.

Before the wedding, however, a wealthy professional gambler, Tommy Korman, notices Betsy's striking resemblance to his beloved late wife, Donna. He arranges a crooked poker game that prompts Jack to borrow $65,000 after being dealt a straight flush, only to lose to the gambler's higher straight flush; Tommy offers to erase the debt in exchange for spending the weekend with Betsy.

After Tommy states he will be a perfect gentleman, the desperate couple agrees. Jack discovers that Tommy has taken Betsy to his vacation home in Kauaʻi. The gambler asks his taxi driver friend, Mahi Mahi, to keep Jack as far as possible from him and Betsy. Jack discovers this and steals the taxi. He sees Betsy outside the Kauai Club where he is attacked by Tommy and arrested. Jack's dentist friend, Sally Molars, bails Jack out of jail. Mahi Mahi meets Jack outside and admits that Tommy left for Las Vegas with Betsy and has convinced her to marry him. Mahi races Jack to the airport. Betsy decides she cannot go through with the wedding and escapes from Tommy.

Meanwhile, after changing many planes and finding himself stuck in San Jose, Jack tries frantically to find a flight to Las Vegas. He joins a group about to depart for Las Vegas but discovers mid-flight that they are the Utah chapter of the "Flying Elvises" – a skydiving team of Elvis impersonators. Jack realizes he has to skydive from 3,000 feet to get to Betsy. Jack overcomes his fear. He lands and spots Betsy, ruining Tommy's plans.

Jack and Betsy are married in a small Las Vegas chapel with the Flying Elvises as guests. Jack is wearing a white illuminated jumpsuit and Betsy is in a stolen showgirl outfit.

== Cast ==
- James Caan as Tommy Korman
- Nicolas Cage as Jack Singer
- Sarah Jessica Parker as Betsy Nolan Singer/Donna Korman
- Pat Morita as Mahi Mahi
- Johnny Williams as Johnny Sandwich
- John Capodice as Sally Molars
- Robert Costanzo as Sidney Tomashefsky
- Anne Bancroft as Bea Singer
- Peter Boyle as Chief Orman
- Burton Gilliam as Roy Bacon
- Brent Hinkley as Vern Poole
- Dean Hallo as Lyle Davis
- Seymour Cassel as Tony Cataracts
- Jerry Tarkanian as Sid Feder
- Keone Young as Eddie Wong
- Tony Shalhoub as Buddy Walker
- Bruno Mars (credited as Bruno Hernandez) as Little Elvis
- Clearance Giddens as Black Elvis
- Mike Bubbins as Elvis Impersonator
- Robert Kim as Oriental Elvis
- Johnny Lawson as Elvis Impersonator
- E. P. King as Elvis Impersonator
- Rick Marino as Elvis Impersonator

== Production ==
Director and writer Andrew Bergman said about the film, "It wasn't based on anything. I wanted to do a boy-girl story, and in my perverse fashion, it turned out to be this." The film's budget was $25 million.

Filming began in August 1991, and was underway in Las Vegas by that September. Bally's Casino Resort was among the filming locations in Las Vegas. Las Vegas' Chapel of the Bells wedding chapel was also used for filming. Other filming locations included New York, and Culver Studios in California.

Filming in Kauai was concluded in November 1991. Among the filming locations in Kauai was the Inn on the Cliffs restaurant, located at the Westin Kauai Hotel. Filming also took place at Kauai's National Tropical Botanical Garden. A house on Anini Beach was used as Tommy Korman's Hawaiian residence. The film was initially rated R for language, and was edited to instead receive a PG-13 rating.

== Release ==
A premiere event was held for the film at Mann's Chinese Theatre in Hollywood on August 25, 1992. The film was released theatrically on August 28, 1992.

== Reception ==
=== Box office ===
In the United States and Canada, Honeymoon in Vegas grossed $35.2 million at the box office, against a budget of $25 million It opened at Number 1, and spent its first five weeks in the Top 10 at the domestic box office.

=== Critical response ===
On the review aggregator website Rotten Tomatoes, 65% of 37 critics' reviews are positive, with an average rating of 6.1/10. The website's consensus reads: "Honeymoon in Vegas is a light screwball comedy that has just about what you expect (and nothing you don't)." Metacritic, which uses a weighted average, assigned the film a score of 63 out of 100, based on 25 critics, indicating "generally favorable" reviews.

== Awards and nominations ==
At the 50th Golden Globe Awards, the film was nominated for Best Picture – Musical or Comedy, while Nicolas Cage was nominated for Best Actor – Motion Picture Musical or Comedy.

== Soundtrack ==
The soundtrack was composed of Elvis Presley songs covered by famous country and pop/rock artists.

The film was scored by David Newman.

Professional ratings
Review scores
Source	Rating
AllMusic	4.5/5 stars

=== Track listing ===
1. "All Shook Up" – Billy Joel
2. "Wear My Ring Around Your Neck" – Ricky Van Shelton
3. "Love Me Tender" – Amy Grant
4. "Burning Love" – Travis Tritt
5. "Heartbreak Hotel" – Billy Joel
6. "Are You Lonesome Tonight?" – Bryan Ferry
7. "Suspicious Minds" – Dwight Yoakam
8. "(You're the) Devil in Disguise" – Trisha Yearwood
9. "Hound Dog" – Jeff Beck and Jed Leiber
10. "That's All Right" – Vince Gill
11. "Jailhouse Rock" – John Mellencamp
12. "Blue Hawaii" – Willie Nelson
13. "Can't Help Falling in Love" – Bono

=== Chart performance ===
Chart (1992)	Peak position
U.S. Billboard Top Country Albums	4
U.S. Billboard 200	18
Canadian RPM Country Albums	6
Canadian RPM Top Albums	30

=== Certifications ===
Region	Certification	Certified units/sales
Canada (Music Canada)	Platinum	100,000^{^}
United States (RIAA)	Platinum	1,000,000^{^}
^{^} Shipments figures based on certification alone.

Other tracks featured in the film but not included on the soundtrack include "Viva Las Vegas" by Bruce Springsteen, "Jailhouse Rock", "That's All Right", "It's Now or Never" by Elvis Presley, and "La Donna è Mobile" by Franco Bonisolli.

== Stage adaptation ==
Bergman says when he finished the film he thought it might make a good musical. He was distracted making movies but then had open heart surgery in 2001. "When you have open-heart surgery, you say, what do I really want to do? What haven't I done? I thought it'd be great to do a musical."

Jason Robert Brown, a composer, had always wanted to do Honeymoon as a musical and wrote some songs on spec. He and Bergman agreed to collaborate. "We certainly were looking to do a real book musical that isn't really done much anymore," said Bergman. We wanted the sound to be of the '60s and '70s—not that it's a throwback, but we wanted that sound. We wanted to be brassy, come and love us kind of show."

A big change from the movie was the character of the mother was kept alive. "Having her recur is a great thing for the show," said Bergman. "It keeps her spirit alive and it keeps his mishigas alive. That was a real change."

A musical stage version of the movie was written by Jason Robert Brown (music and lyrics) and Andrew Bergman (book). A Broadway-bound production was expected to debut in Toronto in November 2012, starring Tony Danza as Tommy Korman. However, the Toronto premiere was canceled, and production was transferred to the Paper Mill Playhouse in New Jersey instead with Danza remaining. The Paper Mill production opened on September 26, 2013, and ran through October 27. The musical began previews on Broadway at the Nederlander Theatre on November 18, 2014, and opened officially on January 15, 2015. Direction was by Gary Griffin with choreography by Denis Jones. The cast featured Tony Danza, Rob McClure, and Brynn O'Malley, who were also in the Paper Mill production.

== See also ==
- List of films set in Las Vegas
