= Anini Beach =

Beach in Kauai, Hawaii, United States

Coordinates: 22°13′38″N 159°27′51″W

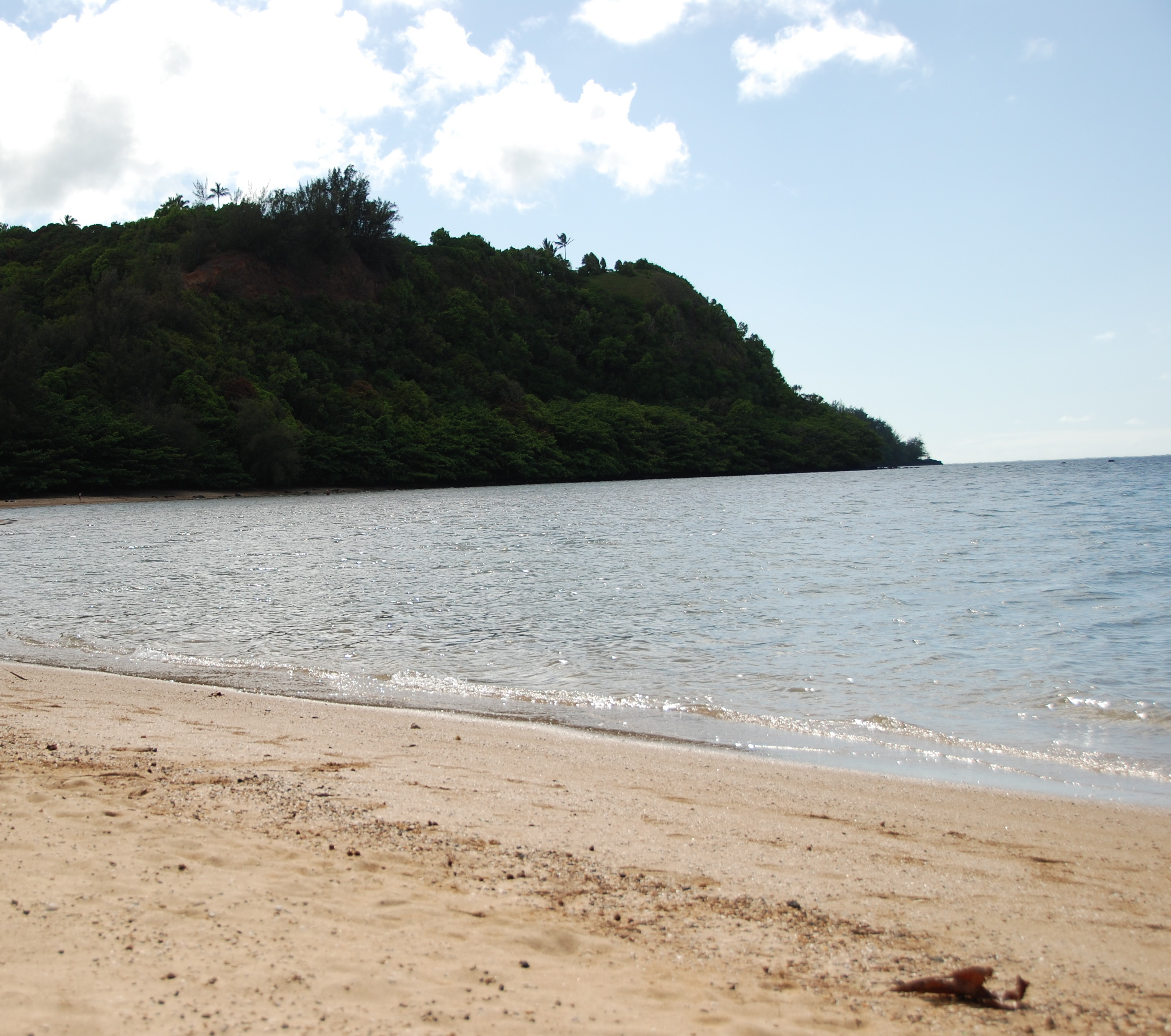
Anini Beach

Anini Beach is a beach located on the north shore of Kauaʻi, Hawaii, United States. It is well known for its excellent windsurfing and views of the large coral reef that rings the island. Nearby waters range between four and 100 feet in depth, and the beach is known for strong currents. Anini Beach is dotted by expensive homes, one of which was used for the filming of Honeymoon in Vegas (1992).The calm and crystal-clear waters make it an excellent spot to explore vibrant coral reefs teeming with marine life.

Anini means "dwarfish" or "stunted" in Hawaiian.
