= Lan Kwai Fong =

Collection of streets in Central, Hong Kong

Lan Kwai Fong 蘭桂坊
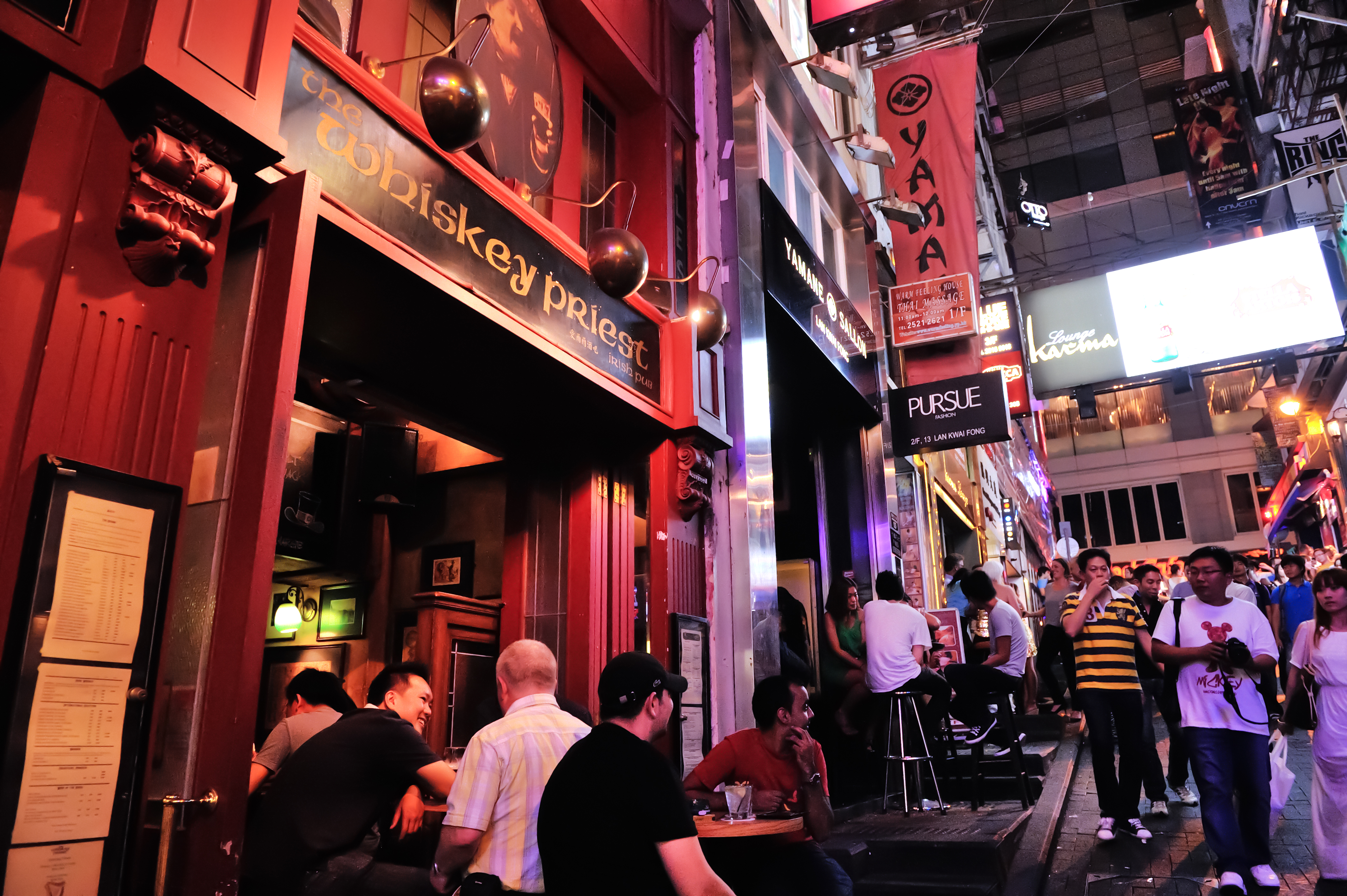
- The area is home to many bars catering to expats
- Interactive map of Lan Kwai Fong
- Coordinates: 22.280972°N 114.155528°E
- Country: Hong Kong
- Neighborhood: Central, Hong Kong

Lan Kwai Fong
- Traditional Chinese: 蘭桂坊
- Simplified Chinese: 兰桂坊
Transcriptions
Standard Mandarin
- Hanyu Pinyin: Lánguì Fāng
Hakka
- Romanization: Lan^{2} Gui^{4} Fong^{1}
Yue: Cantonese
- Yale Romanization: Làahn Gwai Fōng
- Jyutping: Laan4 Gwai3 Fong1
- IPA: [lan˩ kʷɐj˧ fɔŋ˥]

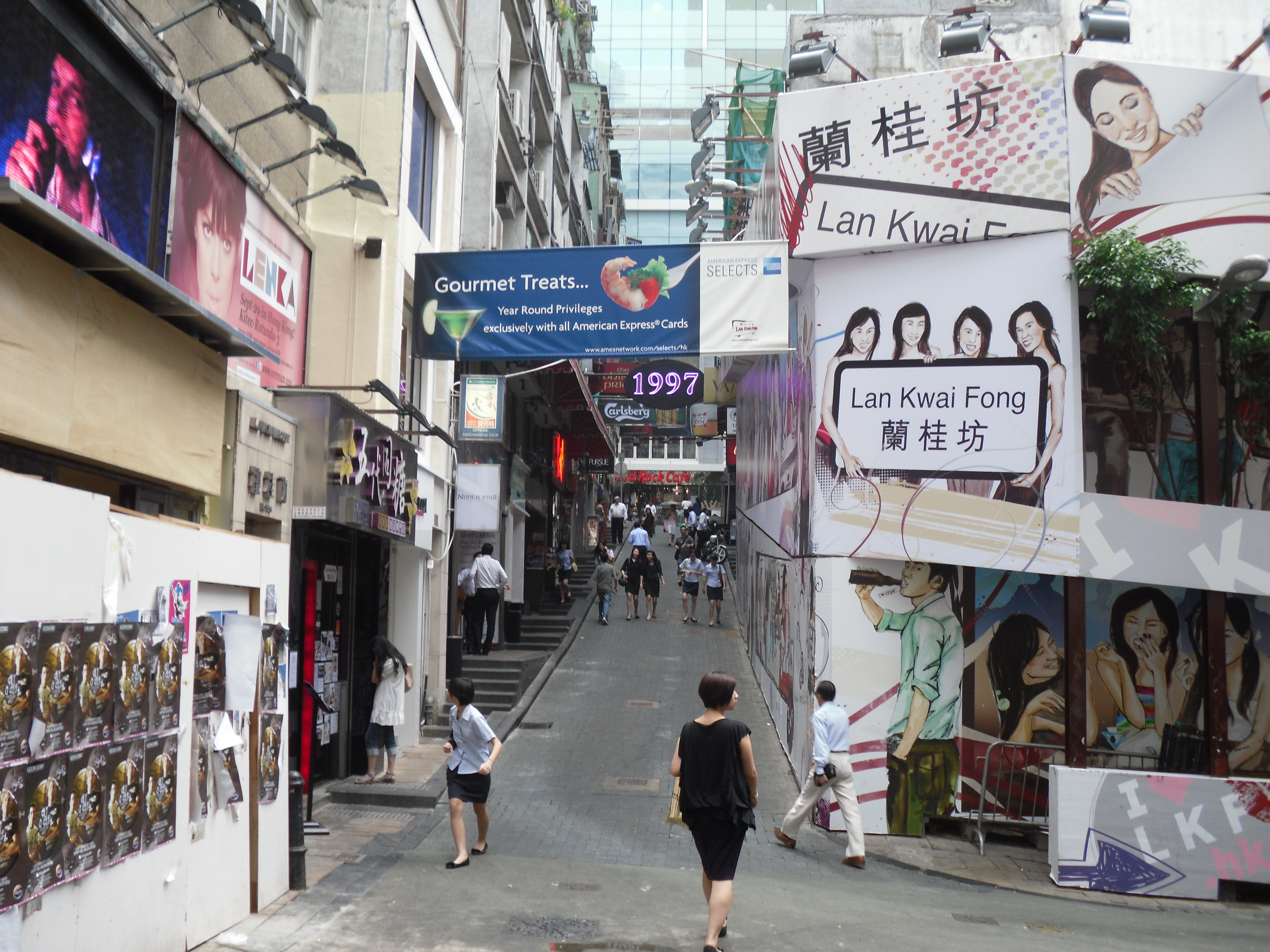
Lan Kwai Fong in 2011

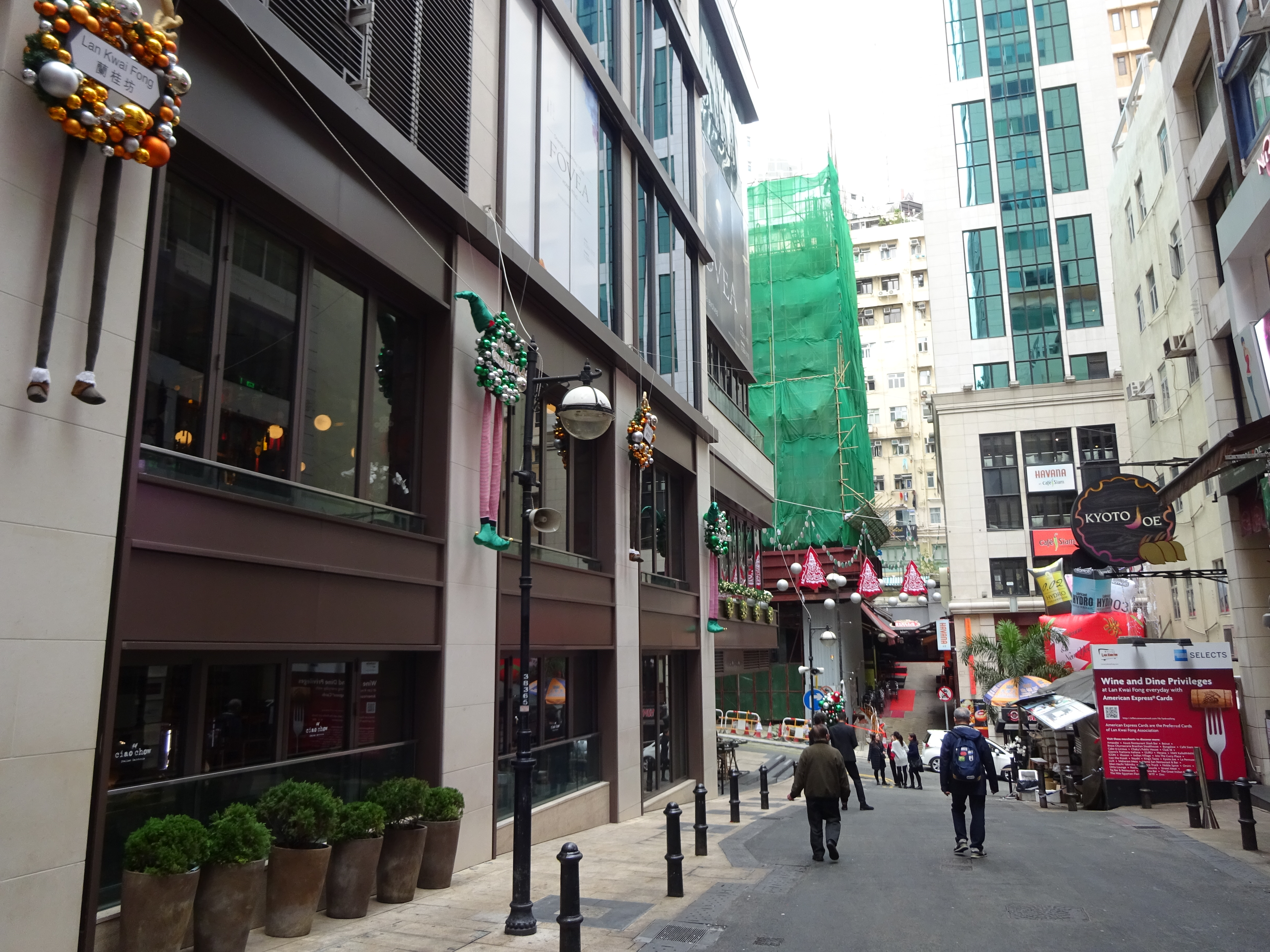
Lan Kwai Fong in 2015

Lan Kwai Fong (Chinese: 蘭桂坊; Jyutping: laan4 gwai3 fong1), often abbreviated to LKF, is a small collection of streets and alleys in Central, Hong Kong. The area was dedicated to hawkers before the Second World War, but underwent a renaissance in the mid-1980s. It is now a popular expatriate haunt in Hong Kong for drinking, clubbing, and dining.

One of the streets is also called Lan Kwai Fong, and is L-shaped with both ends connected to D'Aguilar Street at right angles, thus forming a rectangle.

Wo On Lane and Wing Wah Lane form the northeastern extension of the Lan Kwai Fong area, which arguably also extends to Wellington Street and Wyndham Street, through to the Hong Kong Fringe Club.

The area is also home to a small number of art galleries.

== History ==
In the 19th century, Lan Kwai Fong was home to many traditional Chinese female matchmakers called mui yan (媒人). As a result, the street came to be known as Matchmaker Lane (媒人巷).

When the nightclub 'Disco Disco' was opened by Gordon Huthart on 23 December 1978 in the basement of 40 D'Aguilar Street, the transformation of Lan Kwai Fong into the epicentre of Hong Kong nightlife accelerated, making the nightclub an internationally renowned entertainment venue that was popular among celebrities and expats until its closure in 1986.

Inspired by Montreal's Crescent Street, the Montreal-raised businessman Allan Zeman opened a restaurant called 'California' in Lan Kwai Fong in 1983 as a home-from-home for expats, earning him the nickname "The Father of Lan Kwai Fong" (蘭桂坊之父).

== 1993 New Year's Eve human crush ==
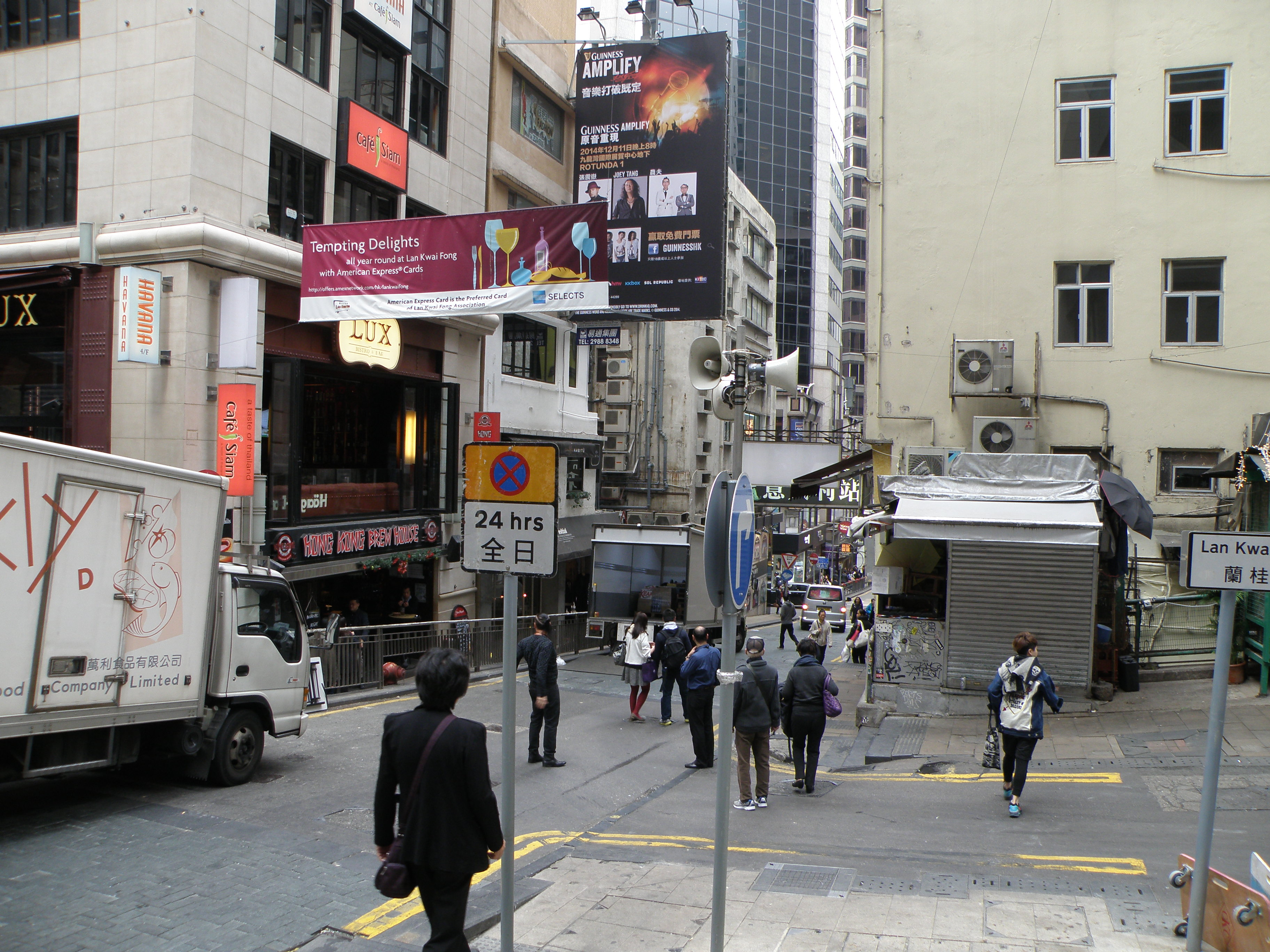
Location of the New Year's Eve incident

On 1 January 1993, 21 people were killed, and 62 injured in a large-scale human crush whilst celebrating New Year's Day in Lan Kwai Fong. More than 15,000 people were crammed into the area for the New Year countdown at the time, resulting in a stampede. The Hong Kong government appointed Court of First Instance judge Kemal Bokhary to conduct an inquest into the disaster. The stringent crowd control measures now in force during public holidays and events are a direct consequence of the inquest's recommendations.

== Transport ==
There are several ways to access Lan Kwai Fong via public transport:

- MTR, Central Station, Exit "D2"
- Tung Chung Line/Airport Express, Hong Kong Station, Exit "B2" or "C"
- Public bus routes 12, 12M and 13

== See also ==
- List of places in Hong Kong
- List of restaurant districts and streets
- List of streets and roads in Hong Kong
- Mid-Levels
- SoHo, Hong Kong
- Tourism in Hong Kong
- Wan Chai
- Melvis
