= Melvis =

Elvis Presley impersonator and cultural icon in Hong Kong (1952–2020)

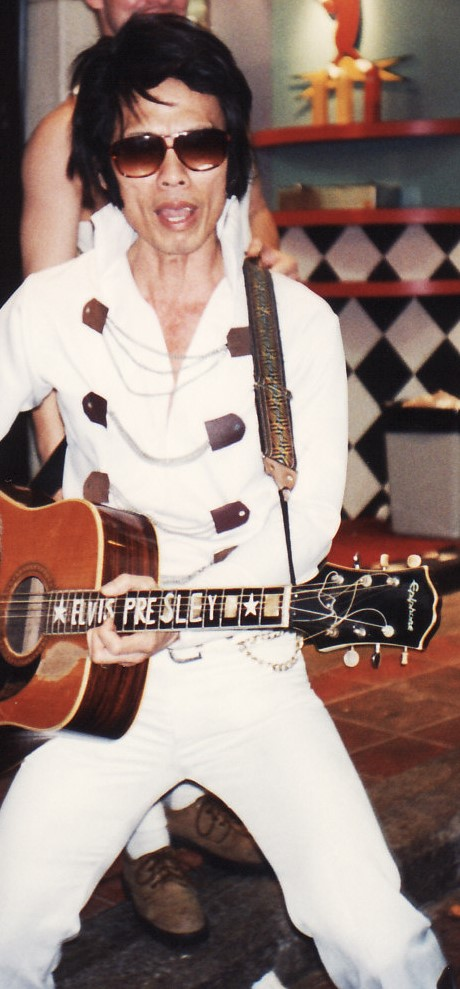
- Melvis in Lan Kwai Fong in 1995
- Born: Kwok Lam-sang; 2 February 1952; Jakarta, Indonesia
- Died: 29 December 2020 (aged 68); Hong Kong
- Other name: Lan Kwai Fong Elvis
- Occupation: Elvis Impersonator
- Years active: 1981–2020

Kwok Lam-sang (2 February 1952 – 29 December 2020) known professionally as Melvis, or Lan Kwai Fong Elvis was an Elvis Presley impersonator and busker and cultural icon in Hong Kong active from 1981 until his death in December 2020.

== Early life ==
Kwok was born in Jakarta, Indonesia to an ethnic Chinese family. His family moved to Guiyang, Guizhou Province, China in 1967. He moved to Hong Kong in 1974 and found a job at an electronics factory in Kwun Tong.

== Career ==
Kwok said that he became aware of Elvis Presley only after Elvis’ death in 1977 and soon became obsessed with the late singer. Kwok won his first Elvis impersonation contest in 1981 in Kowloon district.

In February 1992, he began busking full-time as the "Cat King", the Chinese name for Elvis. Kwok started frequenting the newly popular Lan Kwai Fong area of Hong Kong Island, playing to the largely expatriate bargoers who would pay him small sums of money to play Elvis songs. His wife Anna was initially reluctant about this choice; however, she supported him in pursuing his passion and became his manager.

When interviewed by The New York Times in 2010, Kwok said that he worked two hours a night making approximately 500 Hong Kong dollars each night. He owned more than 20 custom-made Elvis suits and two guitars. He was described as "not particularly melodious, but… passionate." In addition to busking Kwok performed at private parties. In September 2017 he held a concert at the Sheung Wan Civic Centre.

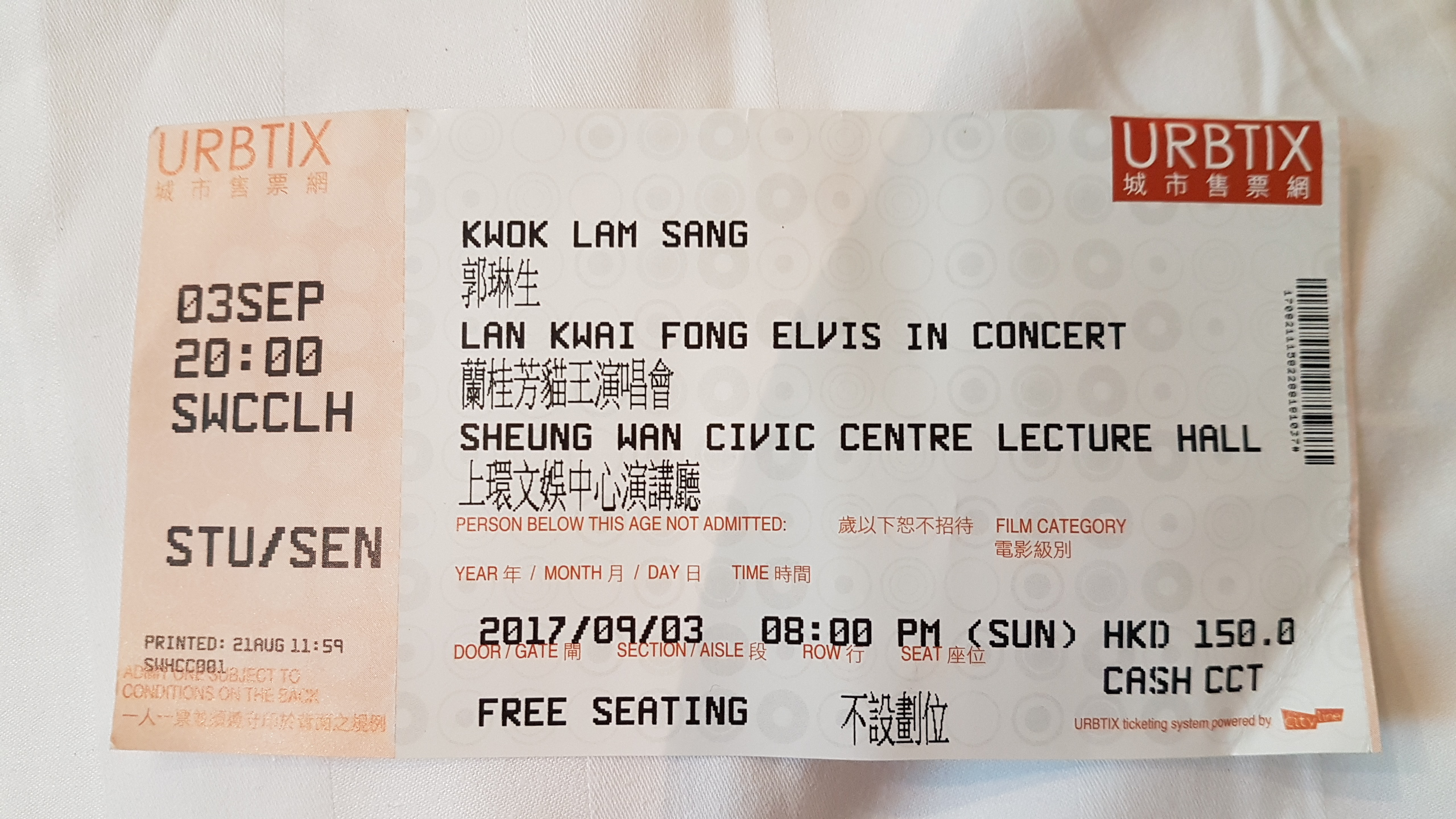
Melvis concert ticket 2017

In an interview in March 2020, Kwok said that he had worked every night for 28 years. With bars in Hong Kong closed due to the COVID-19 pandemic, Kwok said that he had spent most of 2020 in his apartment watching Elvis movies and playing his guitar.

He died of kidney failure on 29 December 2020 at the age of 68. He was survived by his wife Anna and their son and daughter.
