= Clearance Giddens =

American Elvis impersonator

- Also known as: Clarence Giddens, Black Elvis
- Born: Clearance Giddens; Virginia, United States
- Genres: Rock; Gospel
- Occupations: Painter, singer, elvis impersonator
- Instrument: Guitar
- Years active: 1988–present

Clearance Giddens is an American Elvis impersonator called "Black Elvis". He performs sporting a pompadour, sideburns, and bright red jumpsuit. Giddens' Black Elvis act regularly appeared on national TV programs in the 1990s, and he was cast as Black Elvis in the 1992 film Honeymoon in Vegas.

== Early life ==
Giddens grew up in Painter, Virginia, and works as house painter. He received his first guitar as a gift from his mother. Upon leaving school, he worked in local fields to support his family. Giddens' parents are devout Christians and his mother was initially hesitant about his Elvis act because she considered it worldly.

Clearance Giddens's early influences are country and gospel music, specifically Elvis Presley, James Brown, and Roy C. His family did not have a TV, so he only watched it at his uncle's house about once a month. He remembers being in disbelief in his early teenage years when he first saw Presley dancing and singing on TV since he never heard a white singer with so much soul before. He recalls hiding in the closet to listen to Elvis because his strict Christian mother did not allow rock and roll in the house.

Before Giddens started his Elvis act, he was a member of a gospel group called the Gospel Specials who sang with artists such as Al Green and Solomon Burke. He is also credited as guitarist as well lead vocalist on two tracks by a group called Gospel Expressions who released an album, Good Times Bad Times.

== Career ==
=== Origin of Black Elvis ===
Giddens learned to strum "Love Me Tender" because it was a favorite of his then-girlfriend, a devoted Elvis fan. As he was clowning around singing Elvis songs, she suggested he seriously pursue an Elvis impersonator career. He remembers thinking "Black Elvis? Nobody's going to buy that." Giddens mentioned the idea to his boss, who was so enthusiastic that he got Giddens a Saturday gig performing at a restaurant the crew had recently painted. Giddens was so nervous that his legs shook but the crowd roared and tipped him generously. A chef accompanied him on piano and lead guitar, and the room was so full that Giddens' friends had to watch through the window from outside. The duo continued getting gigs and the chef eventually quit his restaurant job. By 1987, Clearance Giddens was performing as Black Elvis across the Eastern shore of Virginia. His ex-girlfriend saw his success and asked for a portion of his earnings for inspiring him. He denied the request.

=== Television and film career ===
Giddens' Black Elvis performance attracted international media attention, and reporters noted his talent and "raw dynamism". For his first national TV spot, he faced his fear of flying to attend The Arsenio Hall Show in California but was so exhausted upon arriving that he slept through his performance. Shortly after waking up that evening, he answered a knock at his hotel room from Entertainment Tonight staff, who asked him to be on the show. He continued to receive TV appearance invites, and he performed for various programs including Hard Copy, Inside Edition, Viva Elvis weekend, and the Howard Stern Show. In one appearance on the Geraldo Show, a Black audience member told Giddens that imitating a white performer was betraying his race, and a different Elvis impersonator replied that what Giddens was doing was beautiful, causing the audience to applaud.

A Hollywood casting director reached out about a film role that involved parachuting out of a plane with other Elvis impersonators as part of a recurring joke in the 1992 romantic comedy Honeymoon in Vegas, which starred Nicolas Cage, James Caan, and Sarah Jessica Parker. Even though he said he couldn't get over his fear of jumping out of a plane, he was cast as Black Elvis and appeared in other scenes. In 1995 he appeared in the film Home for the Holidays shaking Jodie Foster's hand.

=== Live performances and music ===
In the early and mid 1990s, Giddens kept up a regular performance schedule. Memorable events include his Jailhouse Rock duet with Jimmy Buffett at the Jimmy Buffett Bar in Key West and the United States Postal Service-sponsored show in Washington D.C. in honor of an Elvis stamp. Clearance Giddens remained in disbelief as he became more and more successful, sometimes questioning his own talent. He once challenged a fellow Black Elvis impersonator named Robert Washington to a head-to-head showdown and did not get a response. Giddens struggled to book shows of his own despite his growing profile, and he made his act sound more intriguing by performing with a band called The Flamin' Caucasians (and later The White Trash Band). By 1994, he was earning about $2000 per show. After seven years of Elvis classics like Blue Suede Shoes, Clearance Giddens was ready for something new. He released singles of his own and subtly altered his look, trimming his sideburns a little bit and wearing cowboy hats.

Giddens became a father in the mid-1990s and realized he could not keep up with both parenthood and his touring schedule. He stepped back from the Black Elvis circuit so that he could be a dad. He has said he is proud of his daughter. In a 2014 interview, Giddens reported that she had grown up and was studying to become an obstetrician.

=== Reception ===
Giddens was generally praised for the personality he brought to his "Elvis" and his charisma on stage. He sometimes strayed from Elvis Presley's style, and unlike some other impersonators, he played the guitar on stage. He was compared to foundational member of rock and roll, such as Chuck Berry.

=== 2000s ===
Clearance Giddens continued his Black Elvis career on a smaller scale, with Italian restaurant owner Franco Nocera booking shows and a keyboard player named Snowflake providing backup. In addition to regular appearances at local venues and parties, he makes appearances in various productions, such as a 2018 Apple ad that showed Elvis impersonators talking on a group FaceTime calls. He still considers his life to be unbelievable. He appears in the book I Am Elvis: A Guide to Elvis Impersonators.

== Discography ==
EPs and albums
Title	Catalogue	Year	Notes #
Jump, Shout, Scream		1993	
Can You Feel the Flavor?		2009	As Black Elvis

== Filmography ==
List
Title	Role	Director	Year	Notes #
Viva Elvis – Channel 4 1×75 1991 Elvis Special, presented by Jonathan Ross	Himself		1991	
Honeymoon in Vegas	Black Elvis	Andrew Bergman	1992	
Homicide: Life on the Street				

== Stage ==
List
Title	Role	Director	Year	Notes #
Seoul House	Delivery driver		1991	

== Links ==
- Delmarva Now: Va. Shore icon Black Elvis has 'one more tour left'
- YouTube: "BLACK ELVIS" The KIng is back... and he's black. 1996 WBFF TV
- The Free Lance Star September 22, 1994 article
