= Bill Henderson (novelist) =

American author (born 1943)

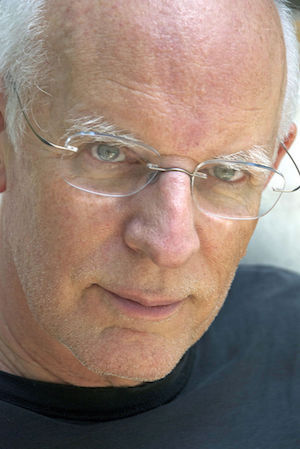

Website
- williammccranorhenderson.com

William McCranor Henderson (born in 1943 in Charlotte, North Carolina) is an American author whose writing explores the mutual influences of popular culture and literature, and the dark side of celebrity. Boston Magazine noted that his work displays "a real feel for the sad, ridiculous squalor in America, the tacky bars and beauty shops and motel swimming pools, the even cheaper dreams of the people who hang out at them." Henderson, according to The Philadelphia Inquirer, "has managed the estimable feat of breathing new life into the theme of adulation and emulation in a fame-happy era."

== Writing ==
Henderson is best known for his novels, Stark Raving Elvis and I Killed Hemingway. The Village Voice characterized Stark Raving Elvis (E.P. Dutton, 1984) as "profoundly concerned with contemporary American culture and its myths." Nikki Giovanni, in The New York Times, called it "funny and revealing," and The Philadelphia Inquirer wrote, "Henderson's writing is nothing if not sure-handed––lean, taut, oddly graceful... There is dark fun to be had in Stark Raving Elvis."

Published nine years later, I Killed Hemingway (Thomas Dunne/St. Martin's, 1993) was a 1993 New York Times Notable Book of the Year. Scott Byrd wrote (in Spectator Magazine), "Henderson's novel is as intricate as a Swiss watch. Fortunately, it runs efficiently—with a strong narrative drive, firm delineation of character, and desperate knowledge of how difficult it is for the central character to make sense of his life, to make peace with his shortcomings, and to define himself authentically." Publishers Weekly observed that: "Henderson's dementedly comic, ribald foray into fiction and fact may alter forever the way we perceive the delicate art of biography."

I Elvis, Confessions of a Counterfeit King (Berkely/Boulevard, 1997), is a nonfiction account of Henderson's own struggle to learn the craft of Elvis impersonation for what became, according to Kirkus Reviews, "a rollicking piece of gonzo journalism." Kirkus added: "Henderson's great achievement is to convey, in elegantly droll prose, what it's like to imagine being a great performer…in the face of real-world evidence to the contrary."

== Life ==
Henderson grew up in Chapel Hill, North Carolina. As a teenager, he was influenced by John Dos Passos' novel The Big Money. He attended Oberlin College, where he majored in philosophy. He was accepted to the Iowa Writers' Workshop in poetry, and switched his course to fiction, studying with novelists Nelson Algren and Kurt Vonnegut.

Throughout the 60s and 70s, Henderson lived in New York City, Los Angeles, and Boston, and had a variety of work experiences as a filmmaker, radio producer, and musician. His first novel, Stark Raving Elvis, published in 1983, was loosely based on some of his early experiences as a musician.

In 1989, he returned to Chapel Hill, where he lives with his wife, Carol Henderson. From 1990 to 2002, Henderson served on the Creative Writing faculties of two universities, University of North Carolina at Chapel Hill and North Carolina State University, teaching fiction writing to undergraduate and graduate level writers.

== Bibliography ==
- Stark Raving Elvis (1984)
- I Killed Hemingway (1993)
- I, Elvis: Confessions of a Counterfeit King (1997)
